= Dumpling =

Food that consists of small pieces of dough

Dumplings
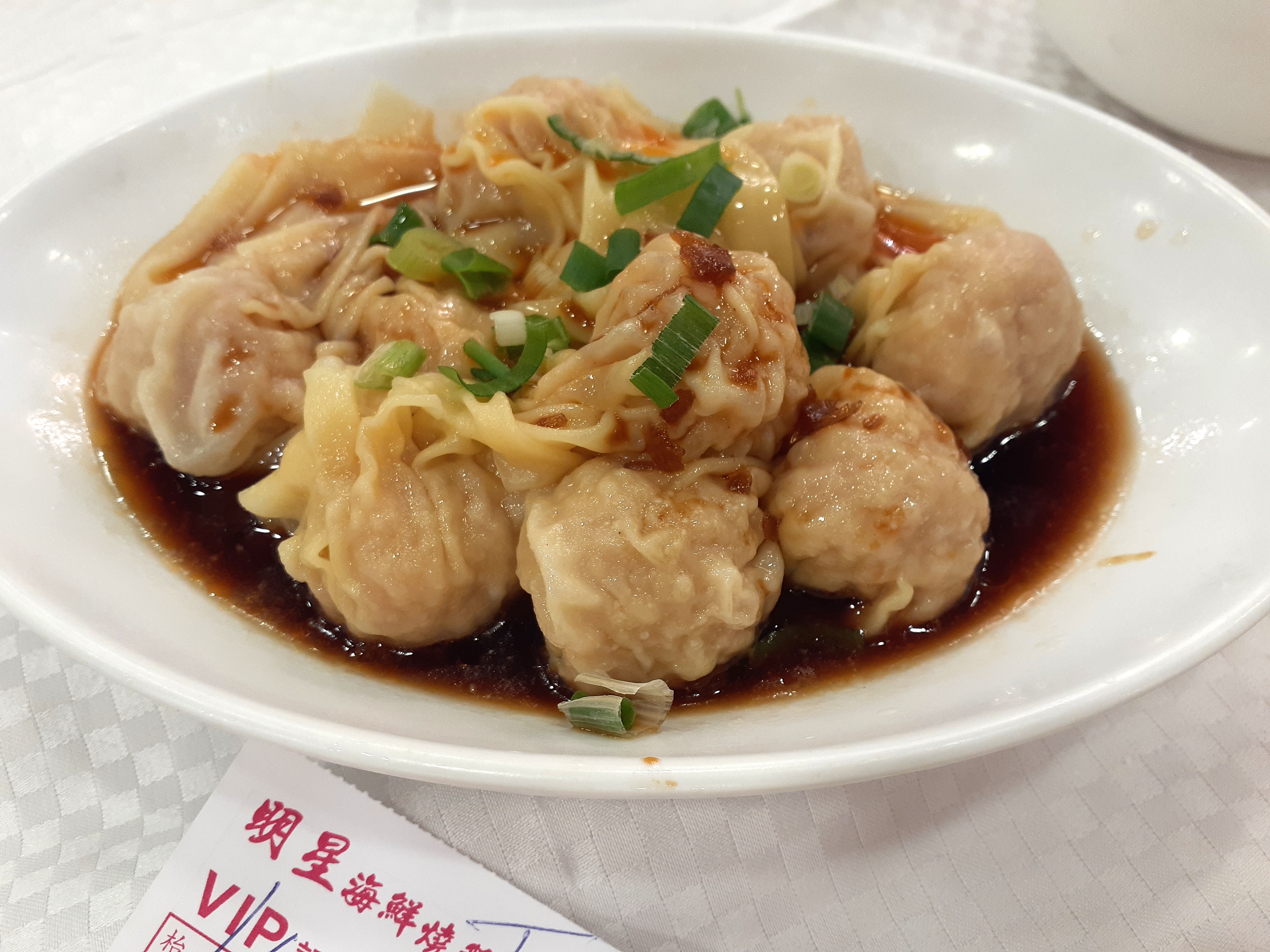
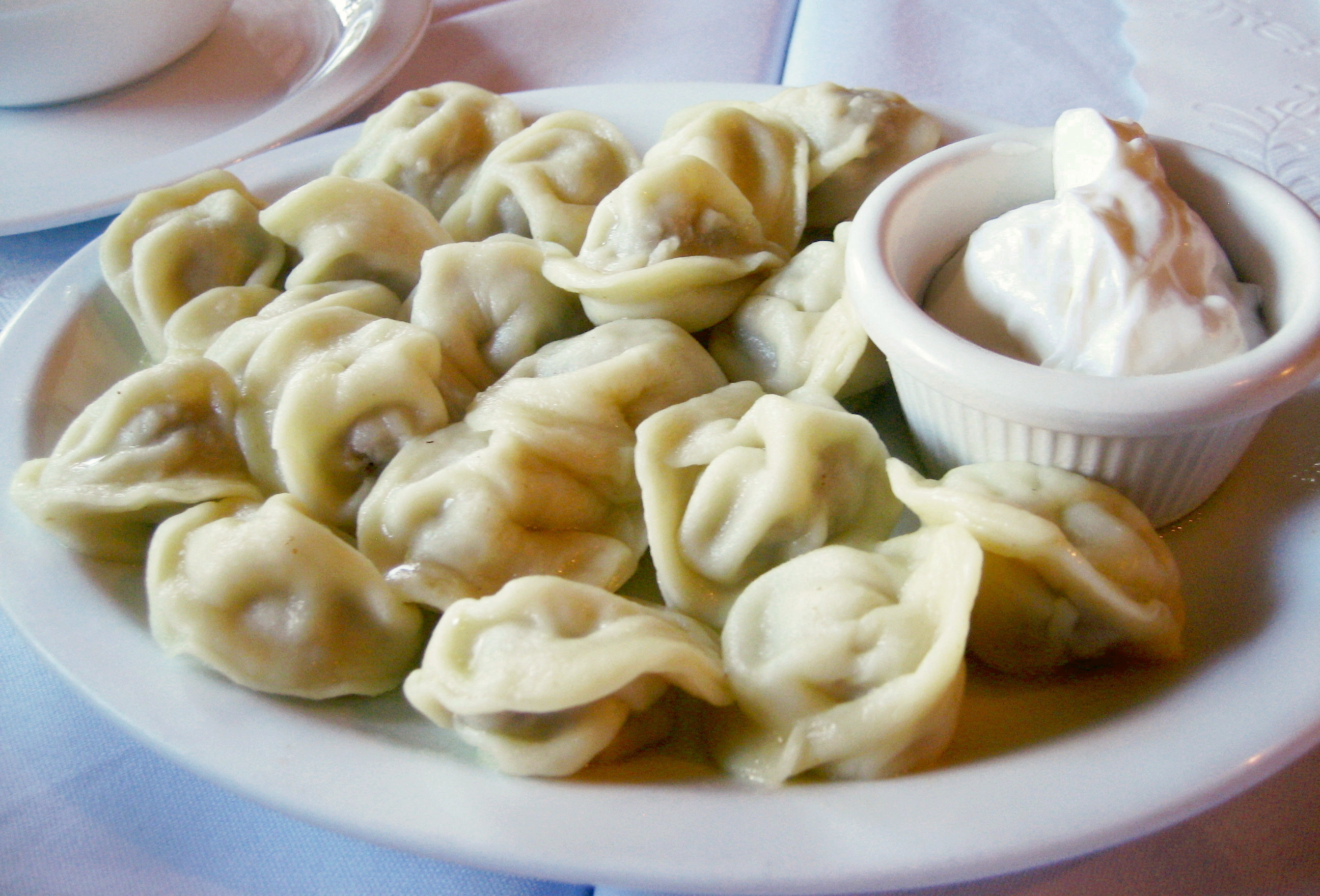
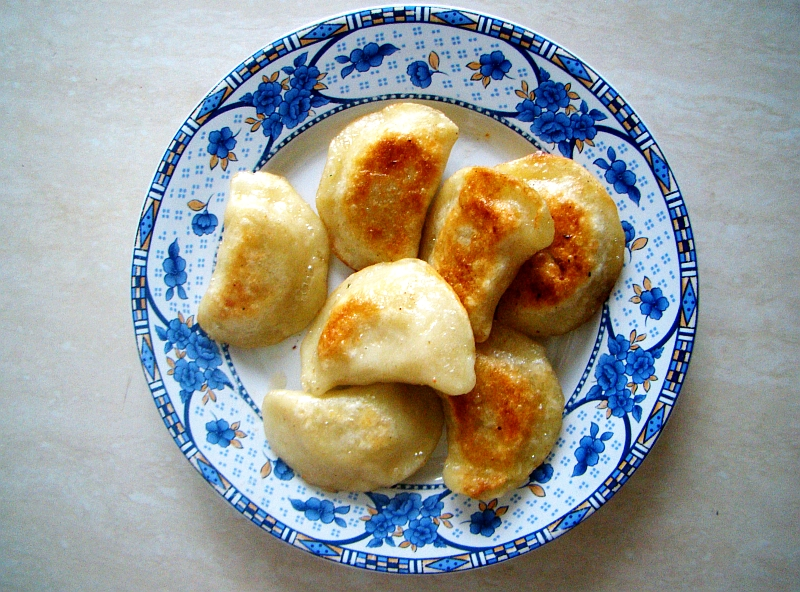
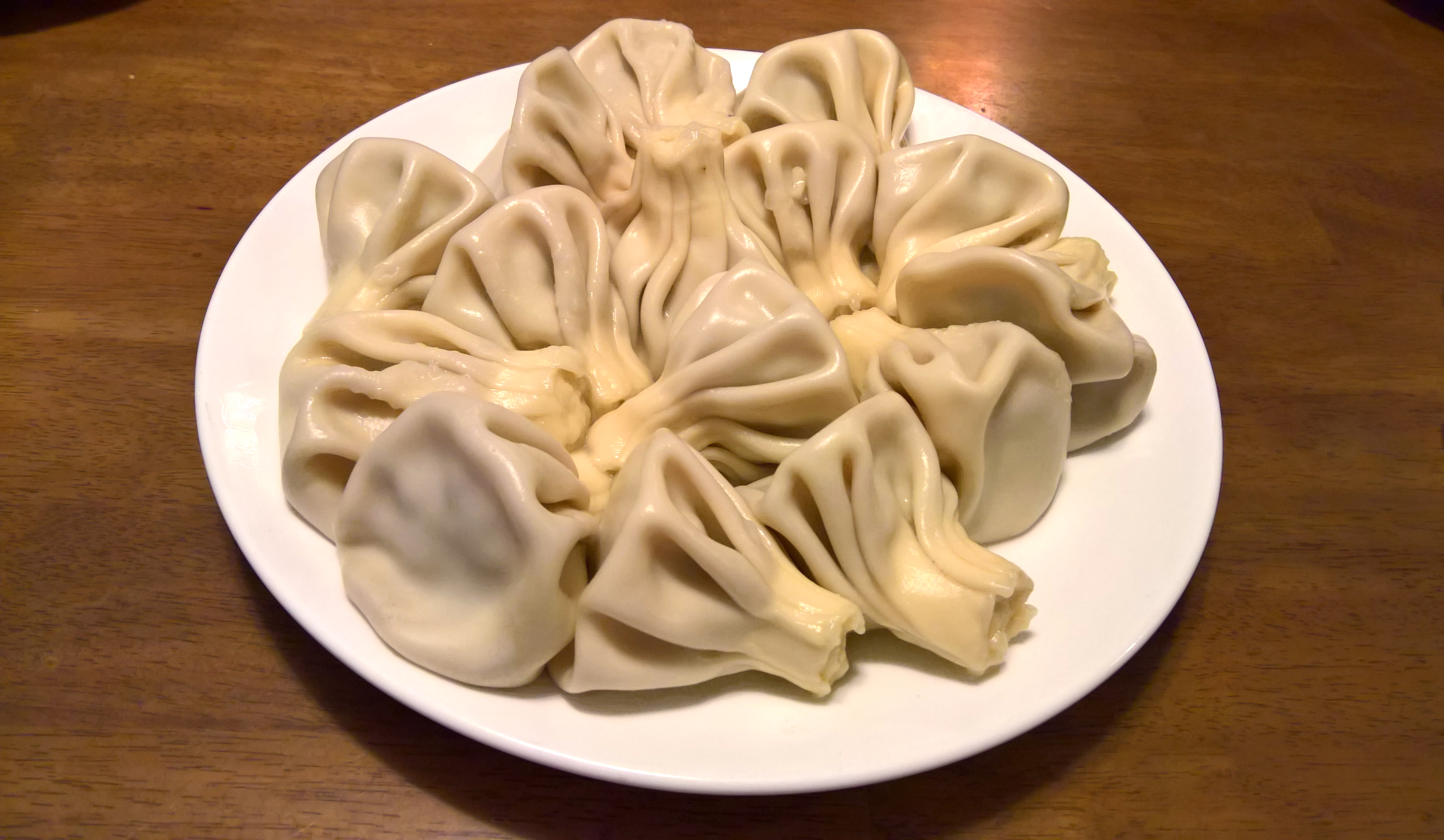
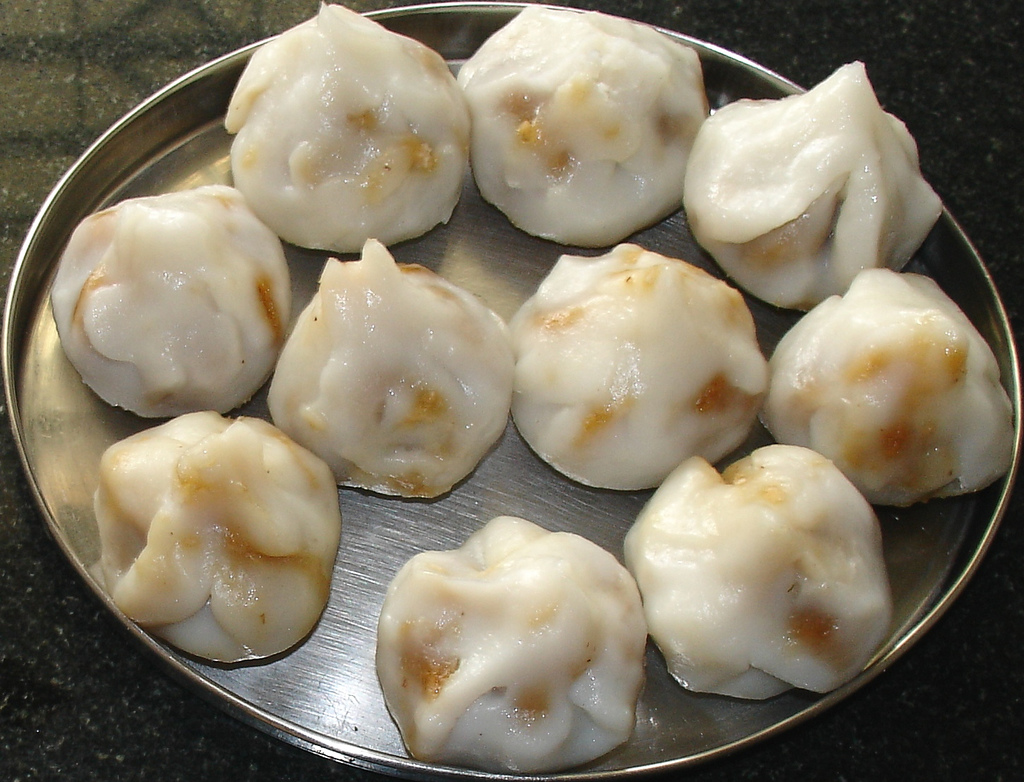
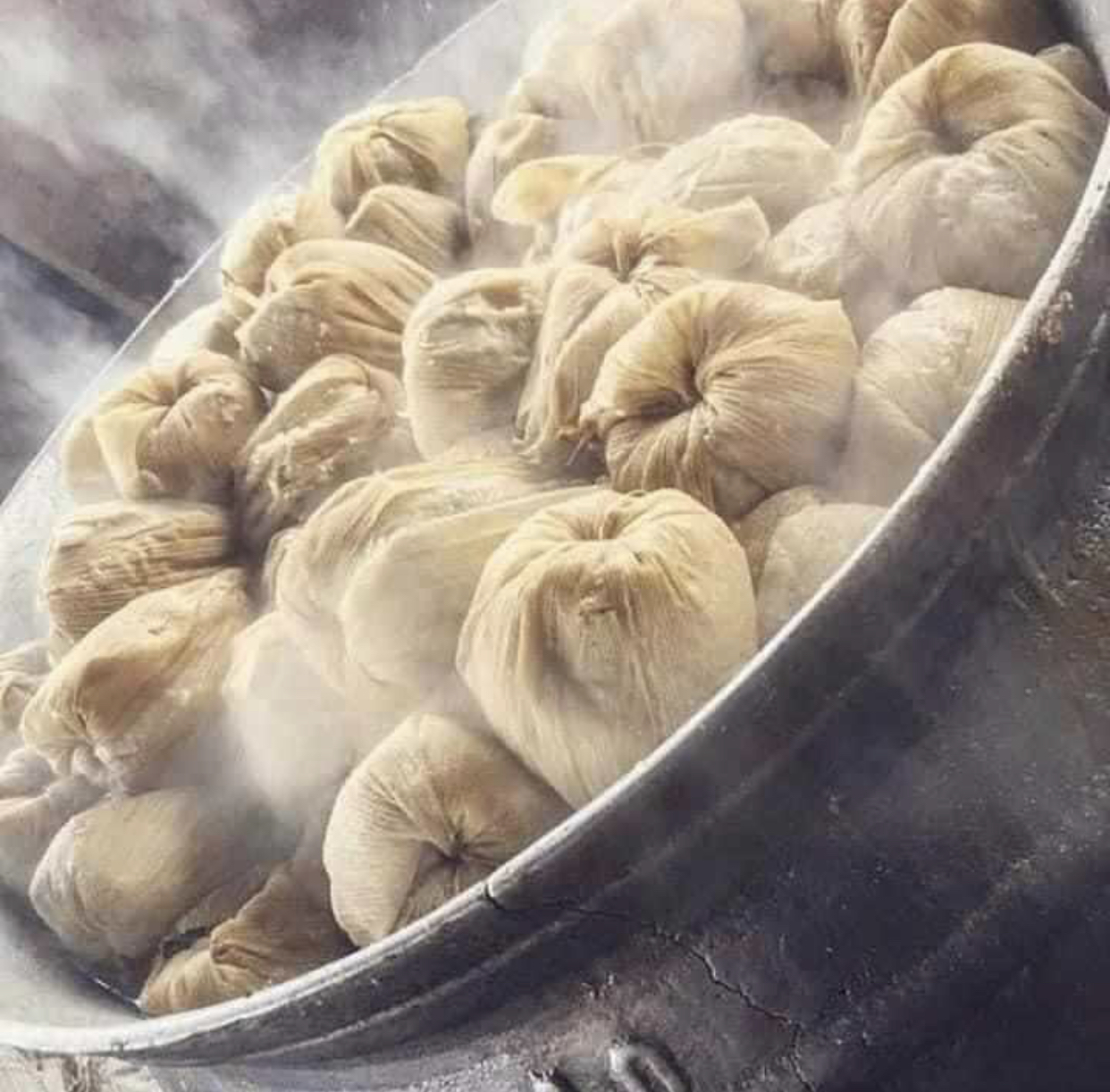
- Varieties of dumplings from around the world (left to right, top to bottom): Chinese wonton; Russian pelmeni; Polish pierogi; Georgian khinkali; South Indian kozhukkatta; West African kenkey
- Main ingredients: Flour, potatoes, bread or rice

Dumplings are a broad class of dishes that consist of pieces of cooked dough (made from a variety of starchy sources), often wrapped around a filling. The dough can be based on bread, wheat or other flours, or potatoes, and it may be filled with meat, fish, tofu, cheese, vegetables, or a combination. Dumplings may be prepared using a variety of cooking methods and are found in many world cuisines.

One of the earliest mentions of dumplings comes from the Chinese scholar Shu Xi who mentions them in a fu poem around 300 CE. In addition, archaeologically preserved dumplings have been found in Turfan, Xinjiang, China dating back over 1,000 years.

== Definition ==
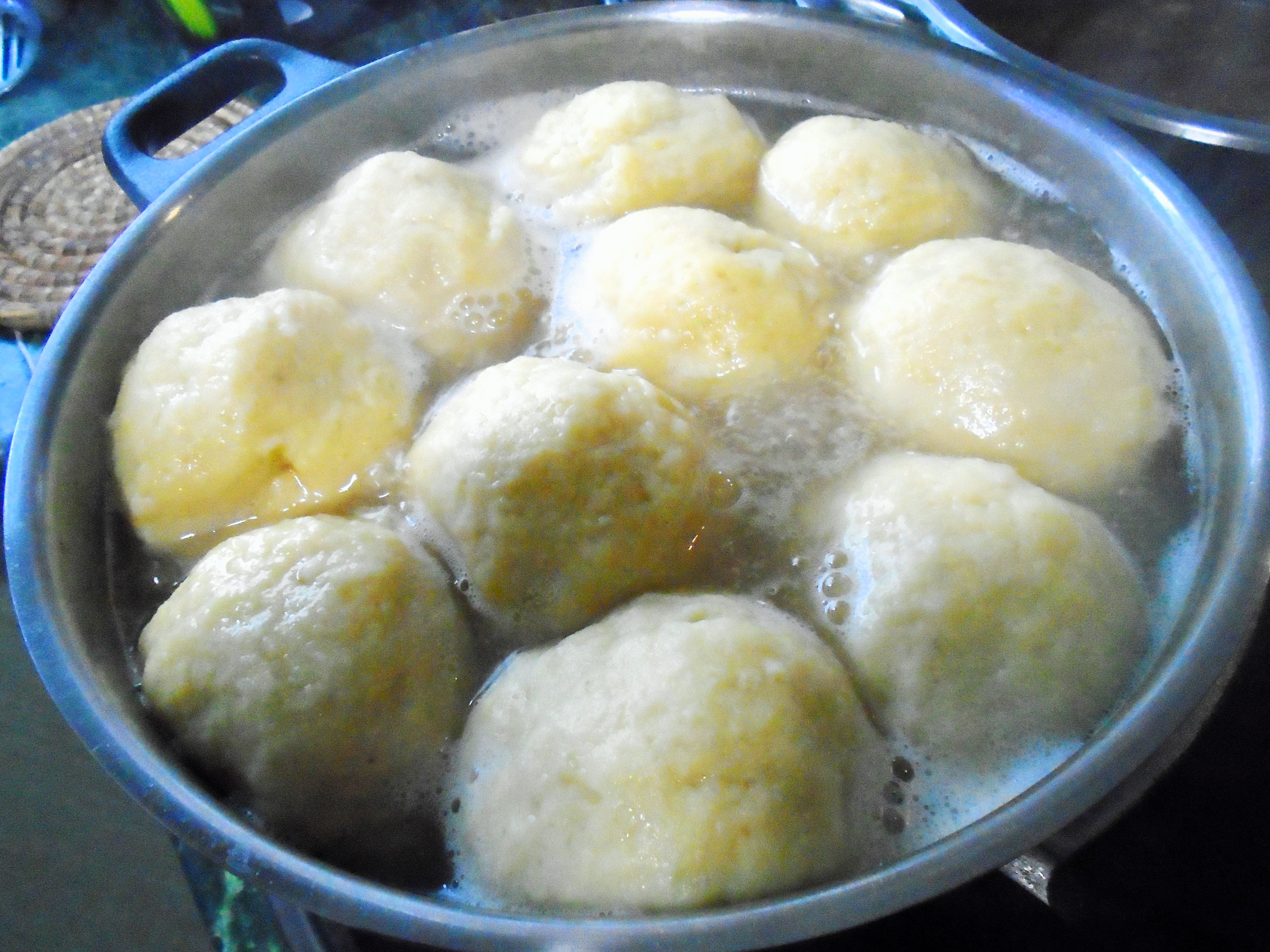
Cooking dumplings in boiling water

The precise definition of a dumpling is controversial, varying across individuals and cultures. The term emerged in English by the 17th century, where it referred to a small lump of dough cooked by simmering or steaming. The definition has since grown to include filled dumplings, where the dough encloses a sweet or savory filling. Dumplings can be cooked in a variety of ways, including boiling, simmering, and steaming, and occasionally baking or frying; however, some definitions rule out baking and frying in order to exclude items like fritters and other pastries that are generally not regarded as dumplings by most individuals.

== African ==
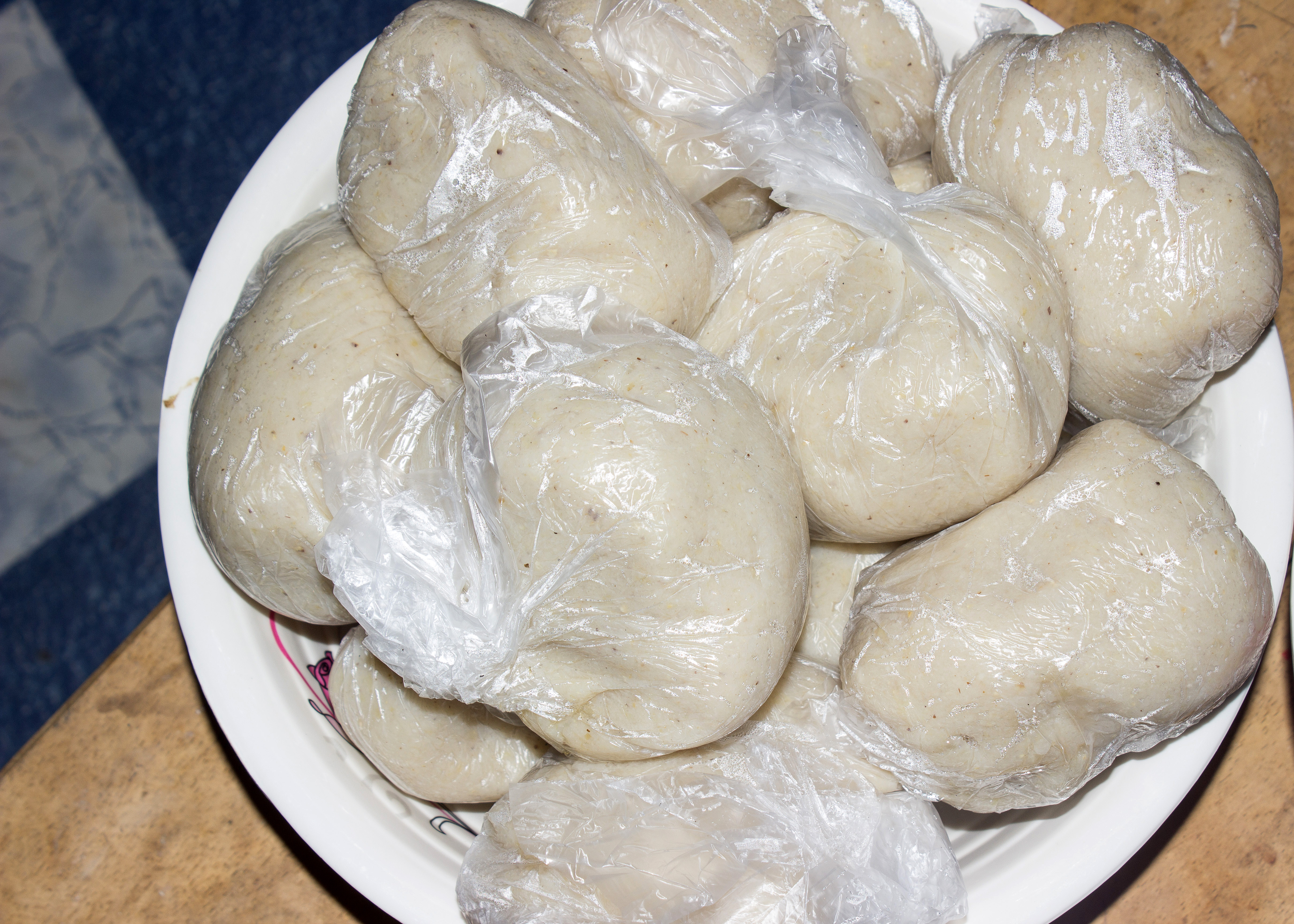
Banku

Banku and kenkey are West African preparations defined as dumplings in that they are steamed starchy balls of dough. Both are formed from fermented cornmeal. Banku is boiled and requires continuous kneading, while kenkey is partly boiled then finished by steaming in corn or banana leaves.

Tihlo, prepared from roasted barley flour, originated in the Tigray Region of Ethiopia and is now very popular in Amhara as well and spreading further south.

Souskluitjies, melkkos, and dombolo are dumplings found in South Africa. Souskluitjies are a steamed sweet dumpling, sometimes made with plain flour and sometimes with the addition of dried fruits or other flavors. They are often served with a syrup flavored with cinnamon or a custard sauce. Dombolo, also called ujeqe or steam bread, is made from steamed dough and is often consumed with different kinds of side dishes such as chicken stew, beef stew, oxtail stew, lamb stew, or tripe.

Kaimati and matobosha are dumplings found in Kenya which are mostly consumed as part of breakfast. They are also commonly served at parties and in fast-food kiosks.

== Caribbean and Latin America ==
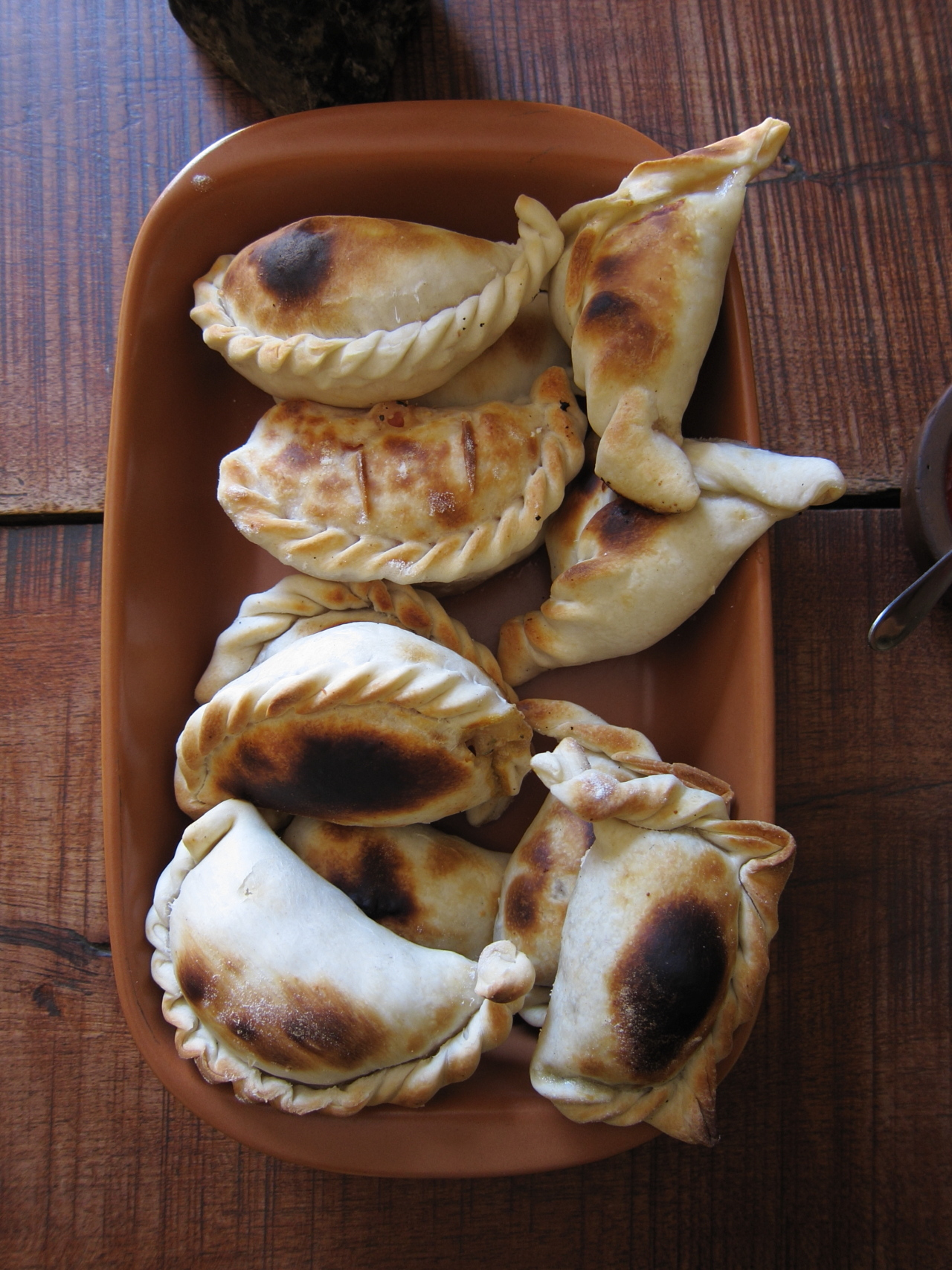
Homemade empanadas from Salta, Argentina

Empanadas, whose stuffing, manufacture and types are numerous and varied, differ from traditional dumplings in that they are deep fried, steamed, or baked, and excess dough is not cut off.

=== Bajan ===
In Barbados, dumplings differ from those in other Caribbean islands in that they are slightly sweetened. The dumplings may either be of the flour or cornmeal variety. The dough is flavoured with spices, cinnamon and nutmeg. Dumplings are often boiled in Bajan soup. When found in stew-like dishes, the dumplings are steamed along with ground provision, salted meat, plantain and other ingredients, and then served with gravy.

=== Brazilian ===
In Brazil, there are a variety of dumplings. Pastéis are made of a thin dough that can be stuffed with a variety of fillings, such as condimented ground beef, chicken, shrimp, mixed vegetables, cheese, or even sweets, and they are typically fried or baked. Empada is made of muffin-shaped dough stuffed primarily with chicken, cheese or seafood. Coxinhas are prepared from a thick dough stuffed with chicken (akin to a chicken corn dog). Bolinhas, which literally translates to 'little balls', can have meat (bolinhas de carne) or cheese (bolinhas de queijo) inside.

All of these dumplings can vary from their original forms with optional additions like olives, onions, or spices. They are commonly served at parties. In some parts of Brazil like Rio, dumplings can be found in fast-food kiosks ('open restaurants'), in the city, or in parks.

=== Caribbean ===
Dumplings are made from a simple dough consisting of all-purpose flour, water, and salt. The shaped dumplings are either fried in a pan until golden brown or boiled in a soup. The fried version is usually served as an accompaniment to breakfast codfish.

=== Chilean ===
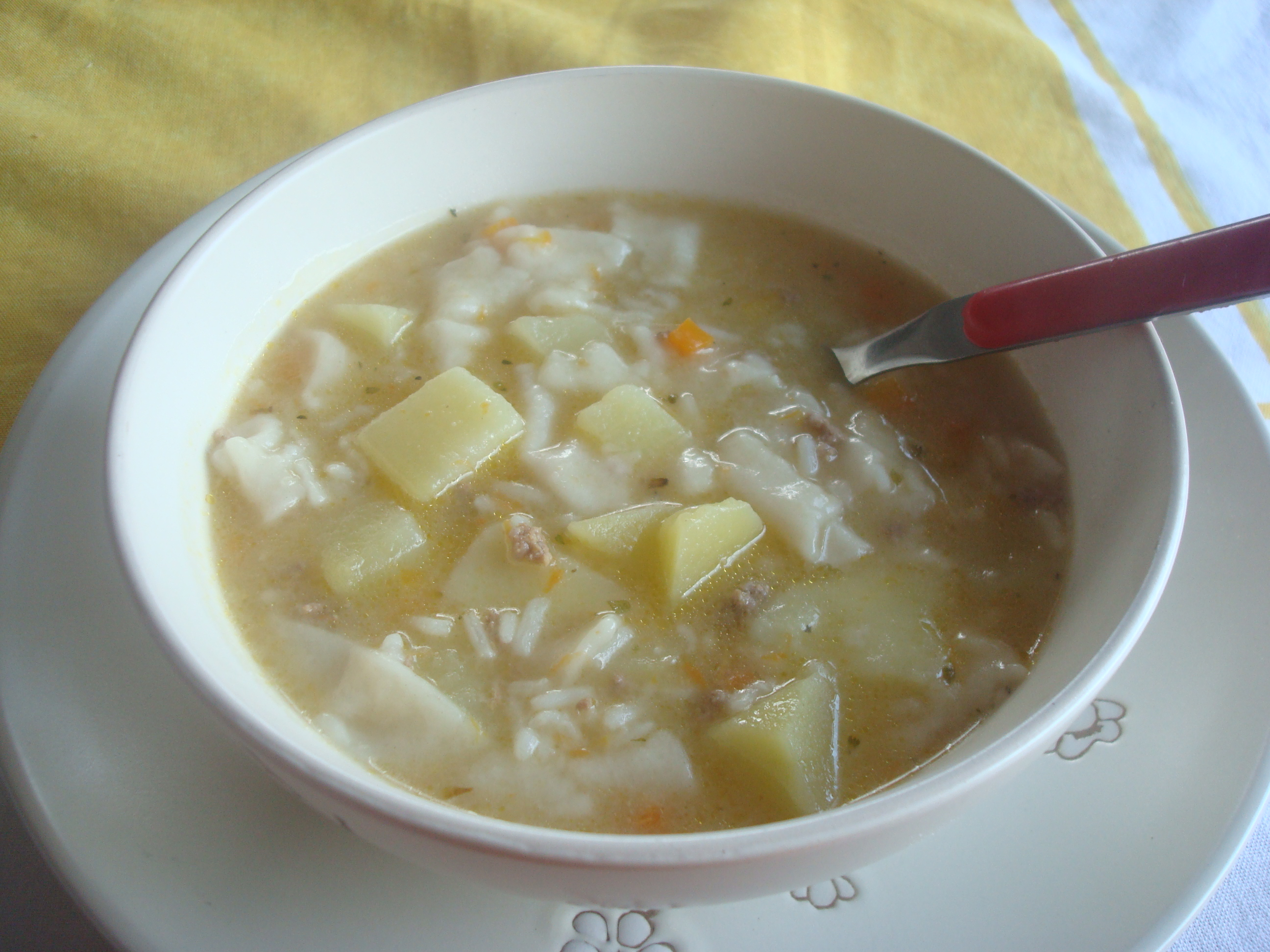
Pantruca

In Chile, pantrucas are a type of flat, elongated irregular dumpling flavoured with fresh parsley and served in soup. In Chiloé, a Chilean southern archipelago where potatoes are native, several traditional dumplings are potato-based, including chapalele, milcao, chuchoca, chuhuañe, and vaeme. Their dough can also include wheat flour or lard in varying proportions. They can be flat and round, filled with greaves and fried (milcao); flat and boiled (chapaleles, milcaos); or shaped into a roll and roasted on a stick (chochoca). They may be served with honey as a dessert.

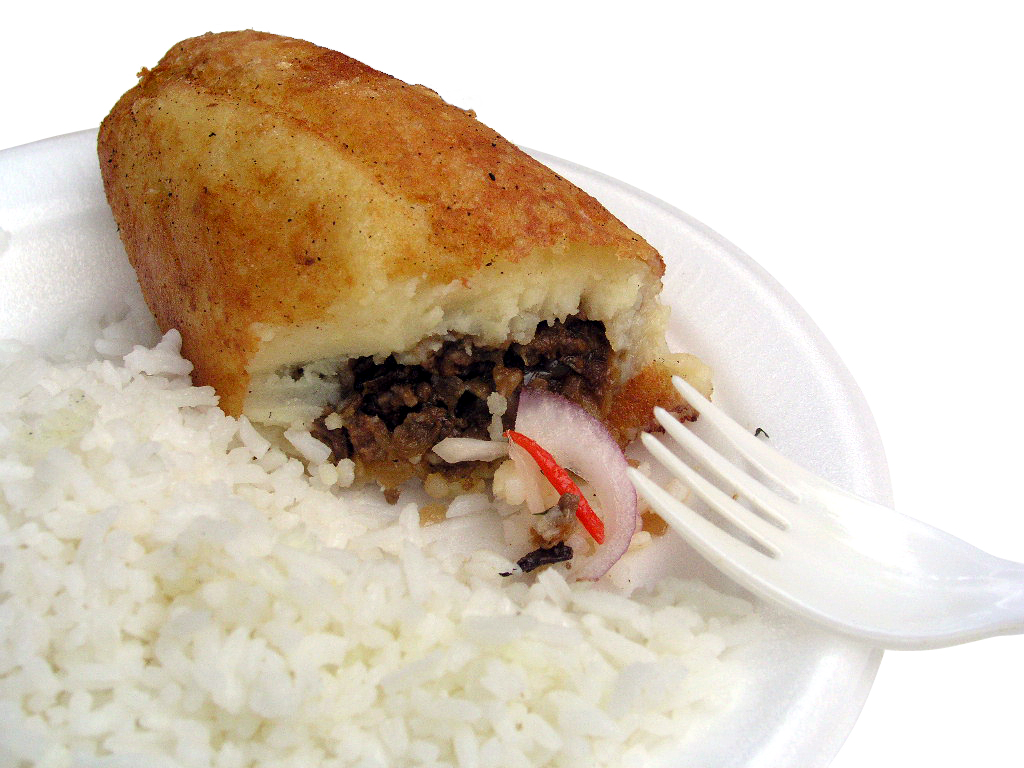
Papa rellena

Papas rellenas are made of a potato- and flour-based dough surrounding a seasoned meat filling.

=== Dominican Republic ===
Dominican domplines arrived with cocolos. They came from the British Caribbean to work in the sugar industry and mainly settled in and around San Pedro de Macorís. They are made with flour and water, rolled into spinners and boiled into soups or salted water and eaten with stews or simply with butter.

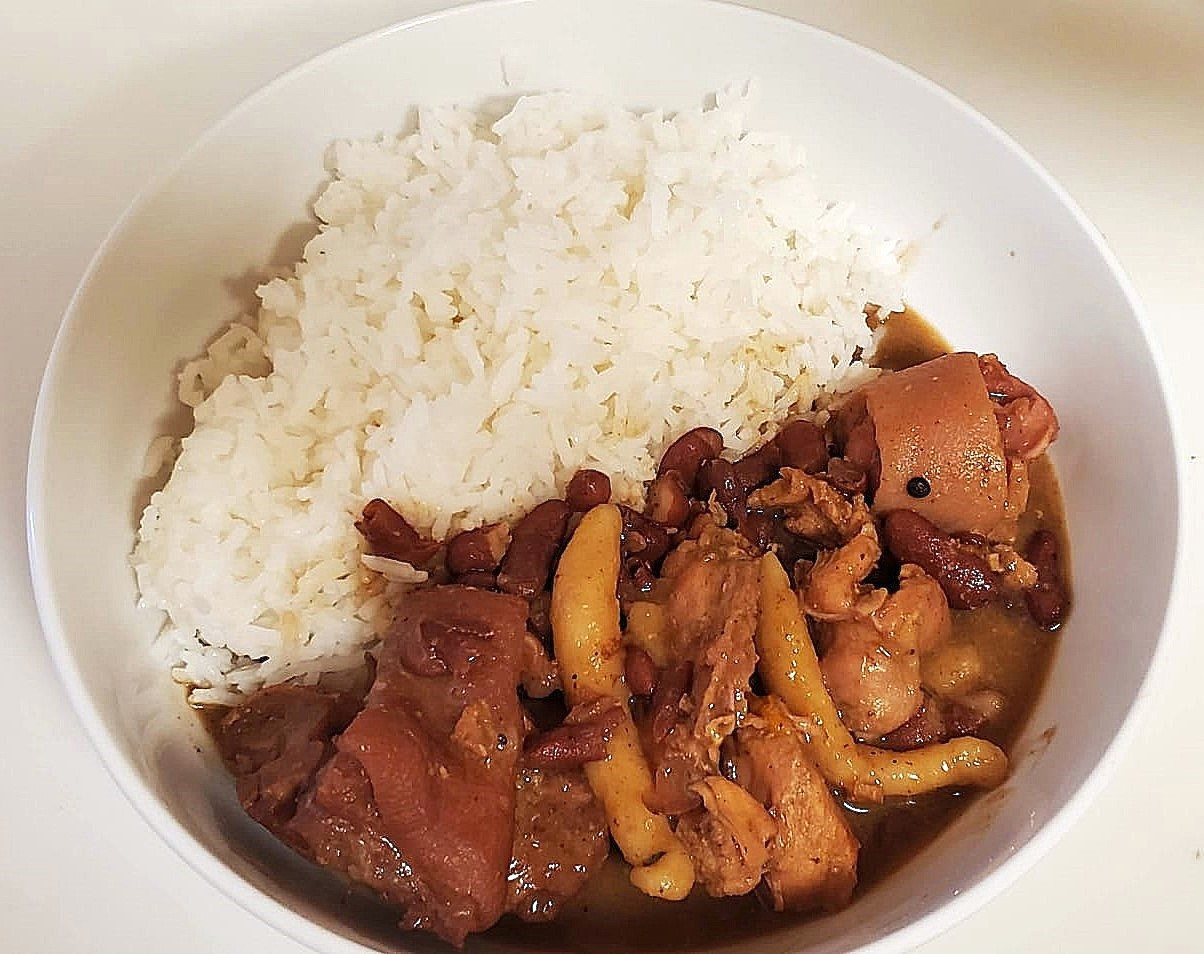
Jamaican spinners (slender, elongated dumplings) in stews or soups. Also, made in the Dominican Republic and Haiti.

=== Haitian ===
In Haiti, doumbrey are elongated flour dumplings. They are made with flour and water, rolled, and boiled in water before being added to soups and stews.

=== Jamaican ===
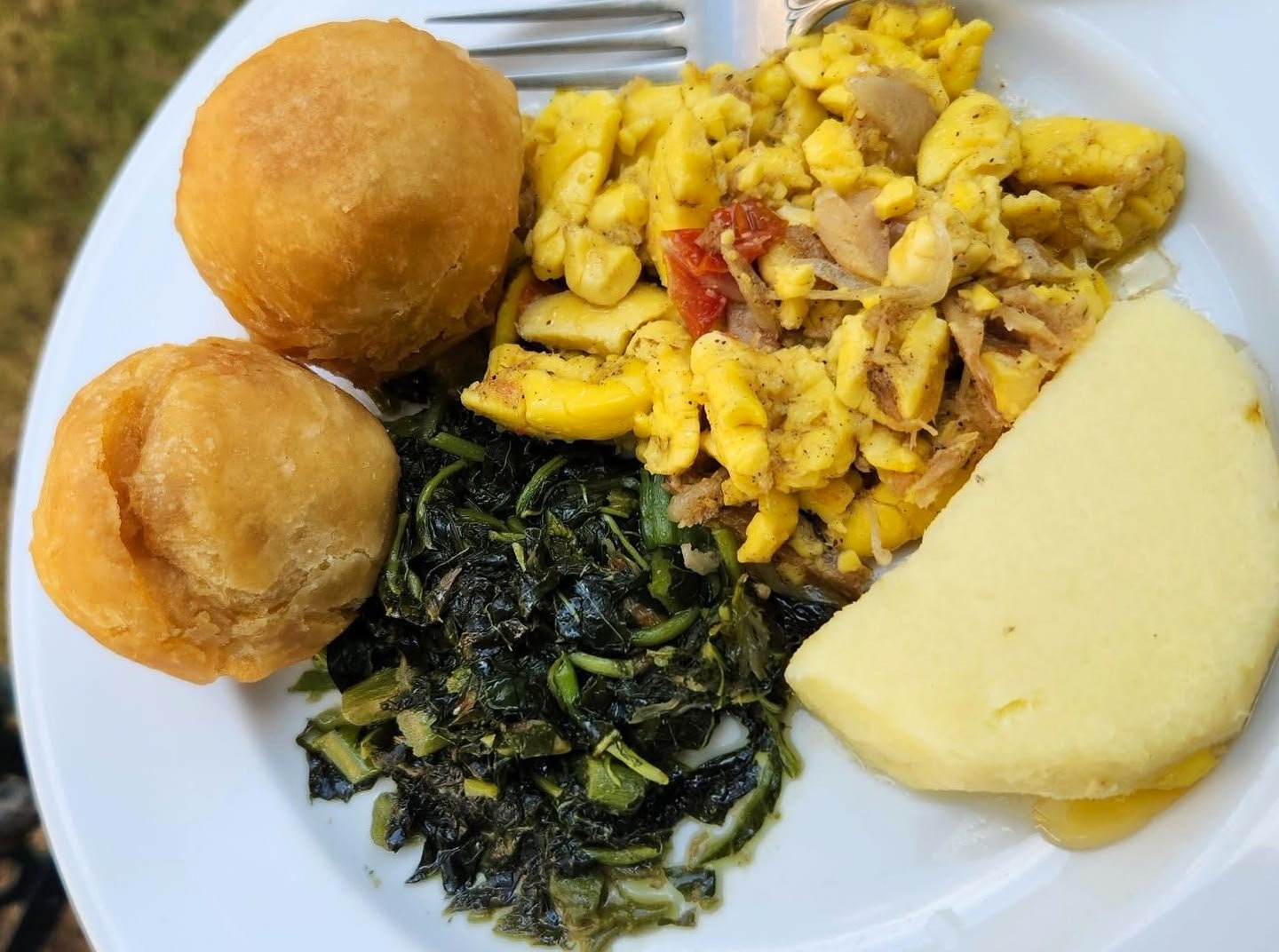
Jamaican fried dumplings with other breakfast items

Dumplings come in three forms in Jamaica: fried, boiled, and roasted. All are made with flour, and those made with white flour dumplings are often mixed with a bit of cornmeal. These foods are often served with a variety of dishes like ackee and saltfish, kidneys, liver, salt mackerel, etc., and often taste better when refried. A refried dumpling is an already-boiled dumpling left over from previous cooking that is then fried to give it a slightly crispy outer layer and a tender middle. A purely fried white flour dumpling (also known as a "Johnny Cake") is golden brown and looks similar to a buñuelo; these can often substitute for boiled dumplings, but they are mostly consumed as part of breakfast. Fried dumplings can be made with or without sugar. One popular variation is the Jamaican festival, a cylindrical fried dumpling made with flour, sugar, cornmeal, and baking powder. These slightly sweet dumplings are served with all types of traditional Jamaican home food, particularly as a complement to the sweet-and-sour escovitch fish, as well as street food.

=== Peruvian ===
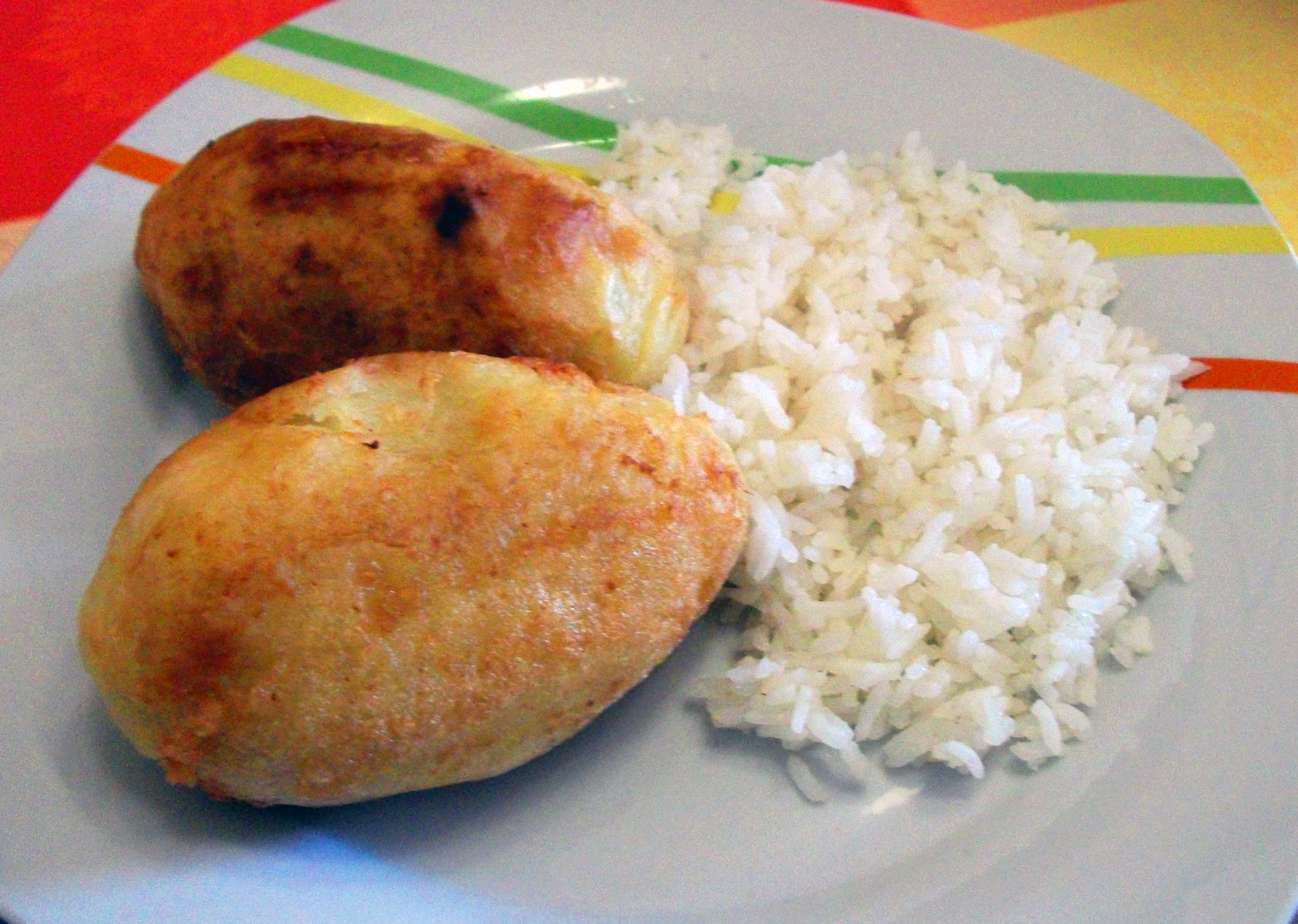
Papas rellenas

Papas rellenas, or stuffed potatoes, consist of a handful of mashed potatoes flattened in the palm of the hand and stuffed with a savory combination of ingredients. The stuffing usually consists of sautéed meat (such as beef, pork, or chicken), onions, and garlic. They are all seasoned with cumin, aji sauce, raisins, peanuts, olives, and sliced or chopped hard-boiled eggs. After stuffing, a ball is formed, rolled in flour, and deep-fried in hot oil. The stuffed potatoes are usually accompanied by a sauce consisting of sliced onions, lime juice, olive oil, salt, pepper, and slices of fresh peppers. The same dish may also be made with seafood. In some countries, yuca purée is used as the starch component.

=== Puerto Rican ===
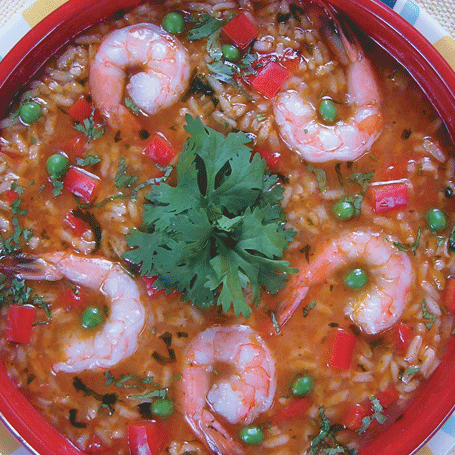
Shrimp asopao

In Puerto Rico, dumplings are made of grated tubers such as yuca, sweet potato and malanga or cornmeal, breadfruit, squash, unripe bananas, or plantains mixed with flour, water, milk or coconut milk, garlic, salt, annatto and parsley. These dumplings are a traditional part of Puerto Rican-style pigeon pea soup called asopao. The dough is kneaded into a bowl or on a table until smooth and pliable, it is then covered and placed aside up to an hour or over night. The dumplings are then formed into small balls and dropped into boiling water or then can be fried before placing them into the soup.

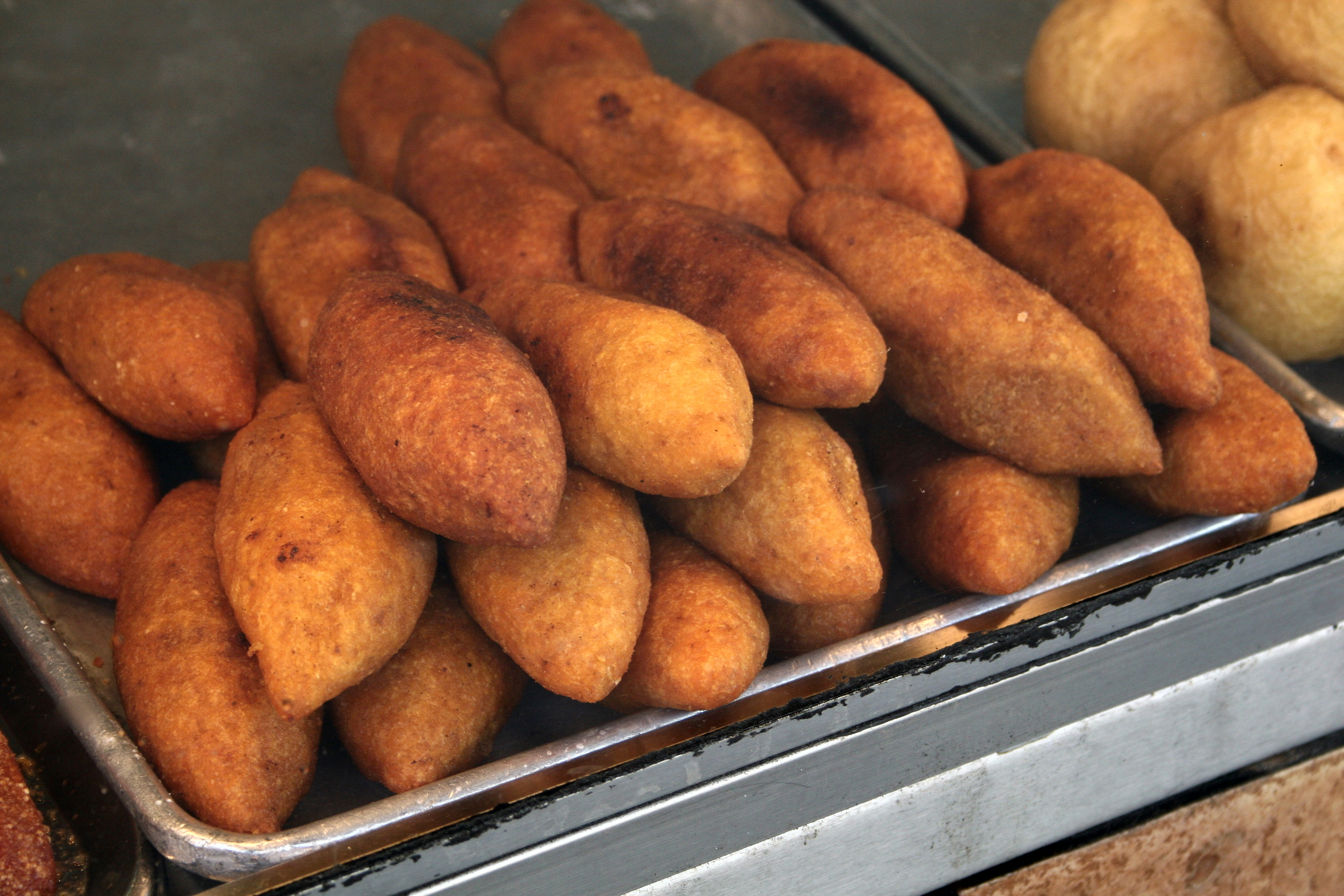
Alcapurria

Alcapurria is a popular fried street dumpling that resembles kibbeh. The dough is made from yautía, green banana, and lard and stuffed with meat.

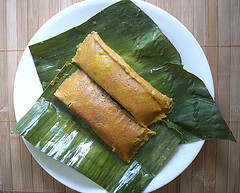
Pasteles

The pastel, a dumpling made from a masa of grated root vegetables, squash, plantains, and unripe bananas, is greatly beloved, especially around Christmas. The Puerto Rican variety has a tender, slightly wet consistency. The masa dough is mixed with milk (optional) and annatto mixed in oil or lard, then stuffed with stewed pork, chick peas, olives, capers or even raisins. The dumplings are then wrapped in a fragrant banana leaf, tied, and then boiled or steamed. The origin of pasteles leads back to Natives on the island of Puerto Rico. Pasteles are popular in the Dominican Republic, Hawaii, Trinidad and lately seen in Cuban cuisine.

=== Salvadoran ===
Pupusas, a thick griddle cake or flatbread from El Salvador and Honduras, are made with cornmeal or rice flour, similar to the Venezuelan and Colombian arepa. They are usually stuffed with one or more ingredients, which may include cheese (such as quesillo or cheese with loroco buds), chicharrón, squash, or refried beans. They are typically accompanied by curtido (a spicy fermented cabbage slaw) and tomato salsa, and are traditionally eaten by hand.

=== Venezuela ===
In the city of El Callao, domplines are fried and made from wheat, and usually filled with curry chicken and cheese. There are usually present in the carnivals of Calypso de El Callao.

== Central Asian ==
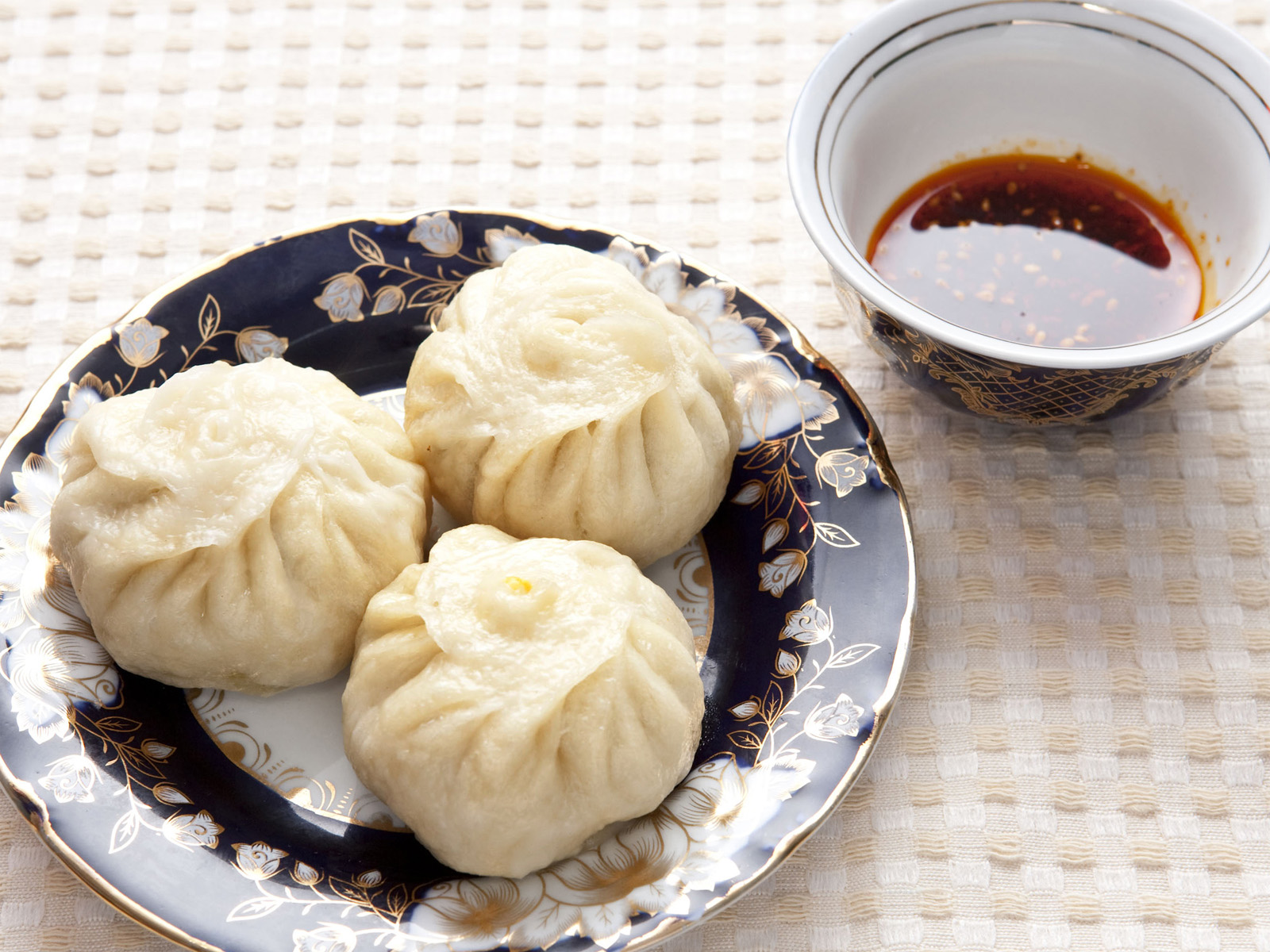
Uyghur manta, a variety of Central Asian manti

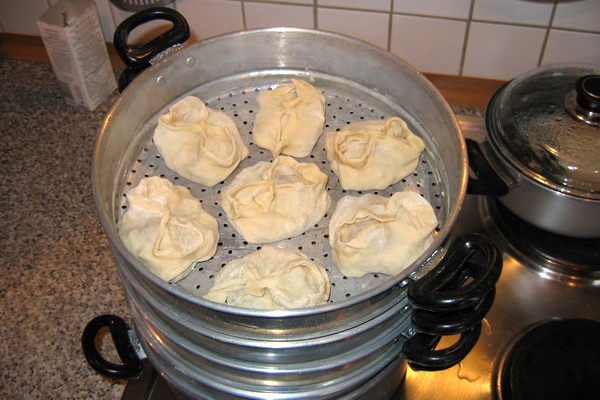
Kazakh/Uzbek/Tajik manti in a steamer

Manti (also manty or mantu) is a steamed dumpling in Central Asian and Chinese Islamic cuisine. It contains a mixture of ground lamb (or beef) spiced with black pepper, enclosed in a dough wrapper. Manti are cooked in a multi-level steamer (mantovarka) and served topped with butter, yogurt, sour cream, or onion sauce. These dumplings are popular throughout Central Asia, including in Afghanistan, Kazakhstan, Kyrgyzstan, Pakistan, Tajikistan, Uzbekistan, the Xinjiang region in China and the Caucasus.

Chuchvara is a very small boiled dumpling typical of Uzbek and Tajik cuisine. Made of unleavened dough squares filled with meat, it is similar to the Russian pelmeni and the Chinese wonton, but in observance of the Islamic dietary rules, the meat filling is without pork. Chuchvara can be served in a clear soup or on their own, with vinegar or sauce based on finely chopped greens, tomatoes and hot peppers. Another popular way of serving chuchvara is topped with suzma (strained qatiq) or with smetana (sour cream), Russian-style.

== East Asian ==
=== Chinese ===
China boasts a wide variety of dishes that can be categorized as "dumplings," but there is no single term in Chinese that unifies all these different types. What are commonly referred to as "dumplings" in English—such as jiǎozi, wonton, and various steamed dumplings—are viewed as distinct dishes within Chinese culinary tradition.

==== Jiaozi ====
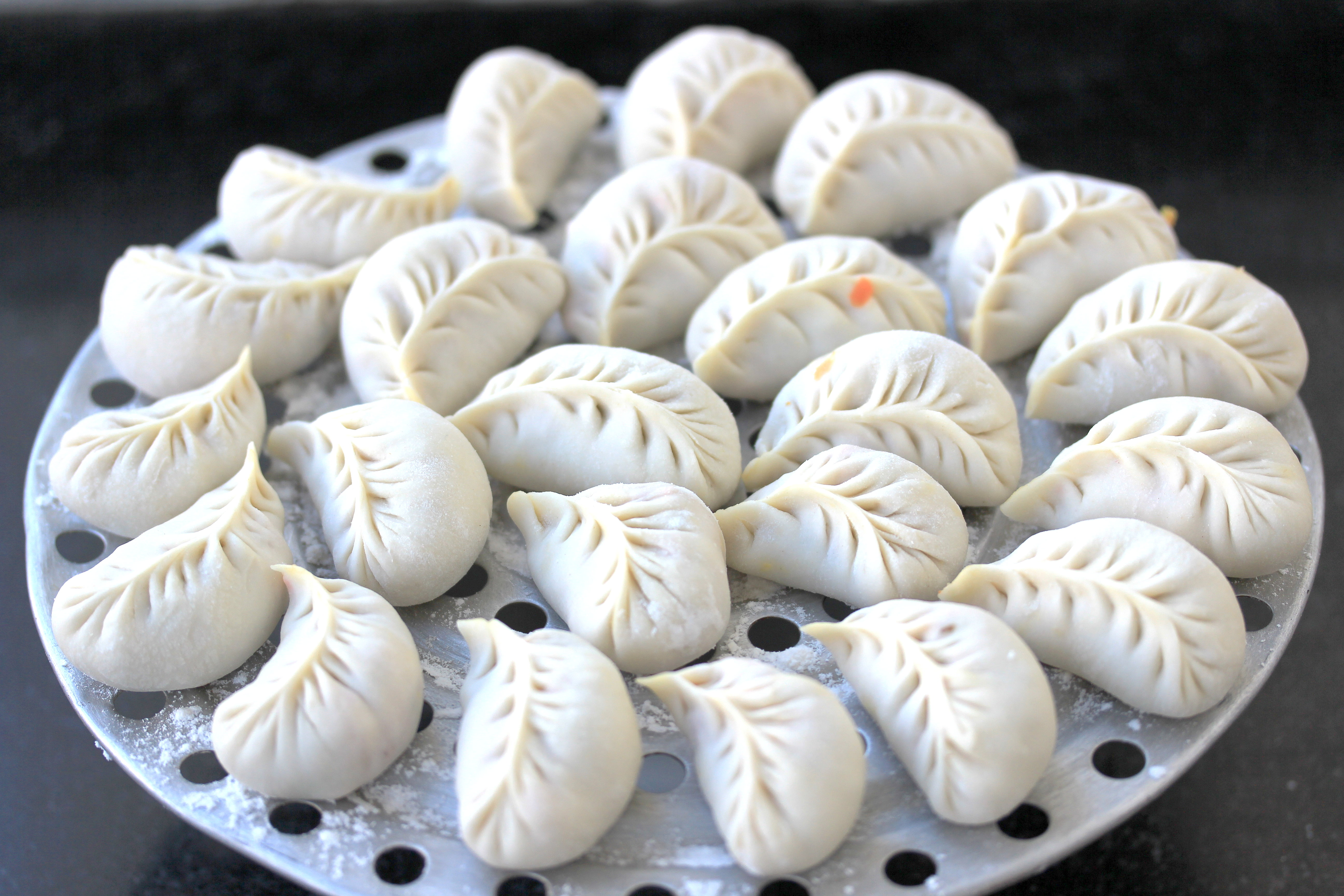
Jiaozi

The jiǎozi (餃子) is a common Chinese dumpling, generally consisting of minced meat and finely-chopped vegetables wrapped into a dough skin. The shape is likened to that of a human ear. The skin can be either thin and elastic or thicker, and it is sometimes said that the skin of a dumpling determines its quality. Popular meat fillings include ground meat (usually pork, but sometimes beef or chicken), shrimp, and fish. Popular mixtures include pork with Chinese cabbage, pork with garlic chives, pork and shrimp with vegetables, pork with spring onion, and garlic chives with scrambled eggs. Filling mixtures vary depending on personal tastes, region, and season. According to region and season, ingredients can include oyster. Jiaozi are usually boiled, steamed, or fried, and they continue to be a traditional dish. In Northern China, dumplings are commonly eaten with a dipping sauce of vinegar, sometimes with chilli oil or paste, and occasionally with some soy sauce added in.

According to legends, jiaozi were invented in the Eastern Han Dynasty between 150 and 219 CE by Zhang Zhongjing, who was a well-known Chinese medicine practitioner. When Zhang returned to his hometown during a harsh winter, he saw many poor people suffering from frostbite in their ears due to the bad governing of the emperor. Using his knowledge of Chinese herbs and medicine, he mixed Chinese medicinal herbs that heat up bodies with lamb and chili in doughs, folded the doughs into the shape of ears, put them in boiling water, and gave them to the poor people. After eating the wrapped dough with herbs and drinking the soup, people's frostbite heals quickly. In memory of his help to many people, eating Jiaozi became a tradition during the winter. Written records show that jiaozi became popular during the Southern and Northern dynasties (420–589 CE) in China, and the earliest unearthed real jiaozi were found in Astana Cemetery dated between 499 CE and 640 CE.

In ancient times, jiaozi were uncommon and treated as a luxury food; however, they are now a common food served throughout the year, especially to celebrate important festivals and dates. Particularly, in Northern China, people generally eat jiaozi on the winter solstice in the hope of a warm winter. Extended family members may gather together to make jiaozi, and they are also eaten at farewells to family members or friends. On the night of Chinese New Year's Eve, jiaozi are usually served at the stroke of midnight after a big dinner. This is because the term "jiaozi" sounds similar to an old Chinese saying that means "stepping into a new era", and this is applied to the New Year. Some people will place a coin or candy inside the dumpling in the hope of obtaining a fortune or having a sweet life. Chinese people also eat jiaozi on the fifth day after the Chinese New Year in the lunar calendar. According to Chinese tradition, many things are forbidden during these first five days, so people eat jiaozi on the 5th day to celebrate the end of this period. On the first day of the hottest days of summer, jiaozi mark the beginning of the harvest, where the harvested wheat is made into foods like jiaozi to celebrate the success of future harvesting.

==== Wonton ====
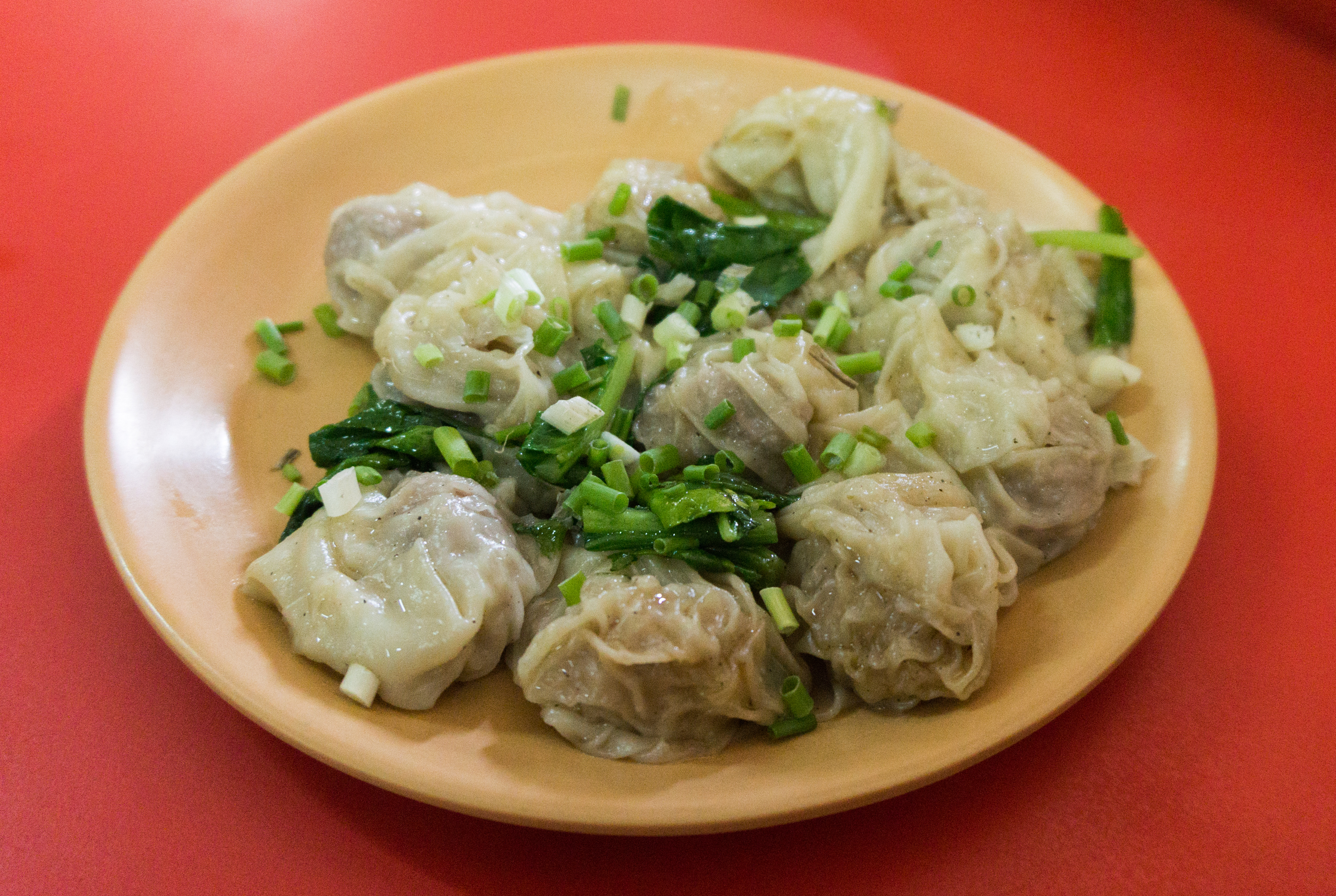
Wonton

The wonton (Cantonese name) or húntun in Mandarin (雲呑/餛飩) is another kind of dumpling, similar in shape to the Italian tortellino. It is typically made with a meat or shrimp filling and boiled in a light broth or soup. Wonton skins are thinner and less elastic than those used for jiaozi. Wontons are more popular in Southern China (Shanghai, Guangdong, Hong Kong etc.), while jiaozi are more popular in Northern China.

==== Baozi ====
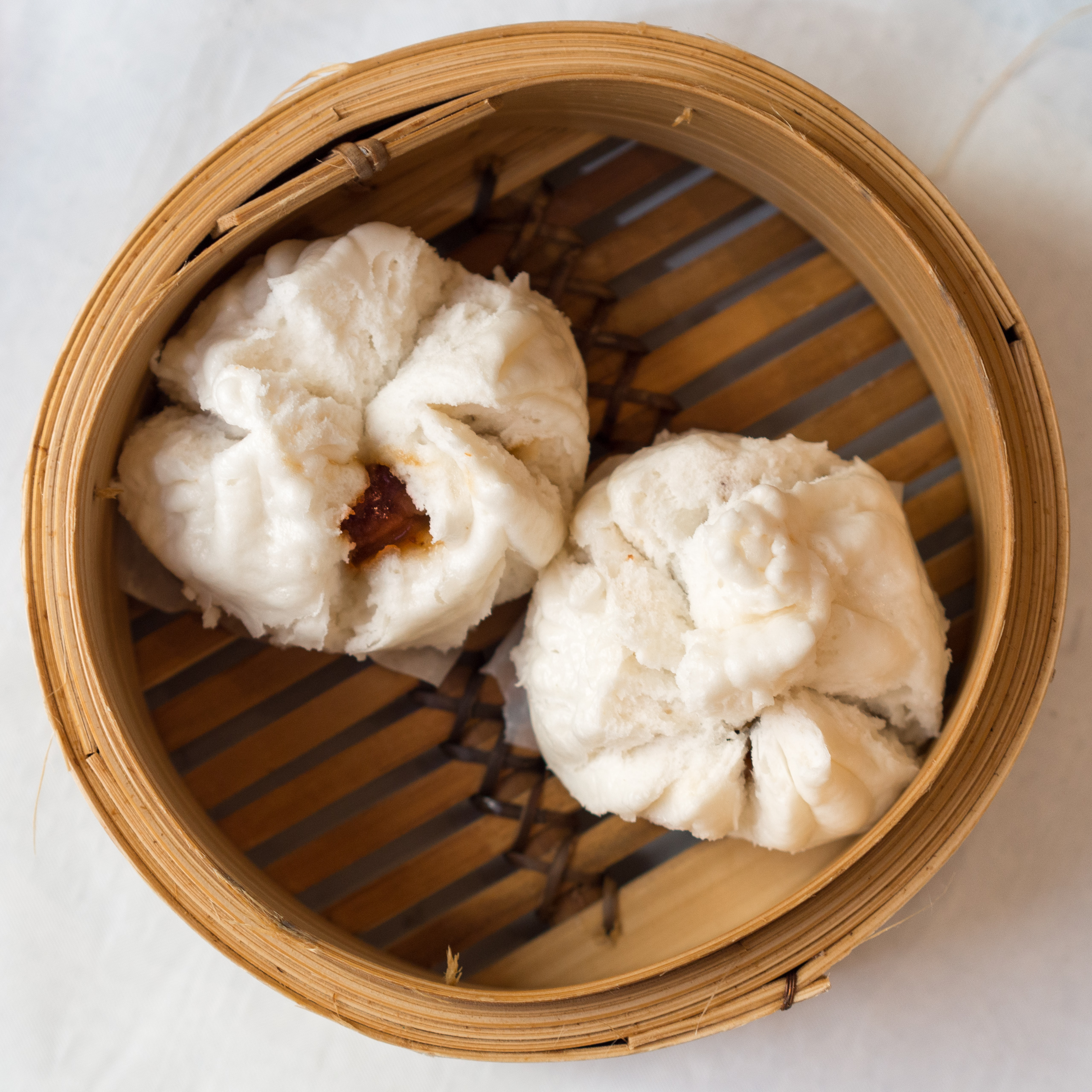
Cha siu bao

Baozi are a range of Chinese yeast-leavened filled buns. They can be either savory or sweet, depending on the filling. Famous varieties include cha siu bao, shui jian bao, and many others. According to legend, the filled baozi was invented by Zhuge Liang, who offered them to a Chinese god for good luck in military operations.

==== Tangbao ====
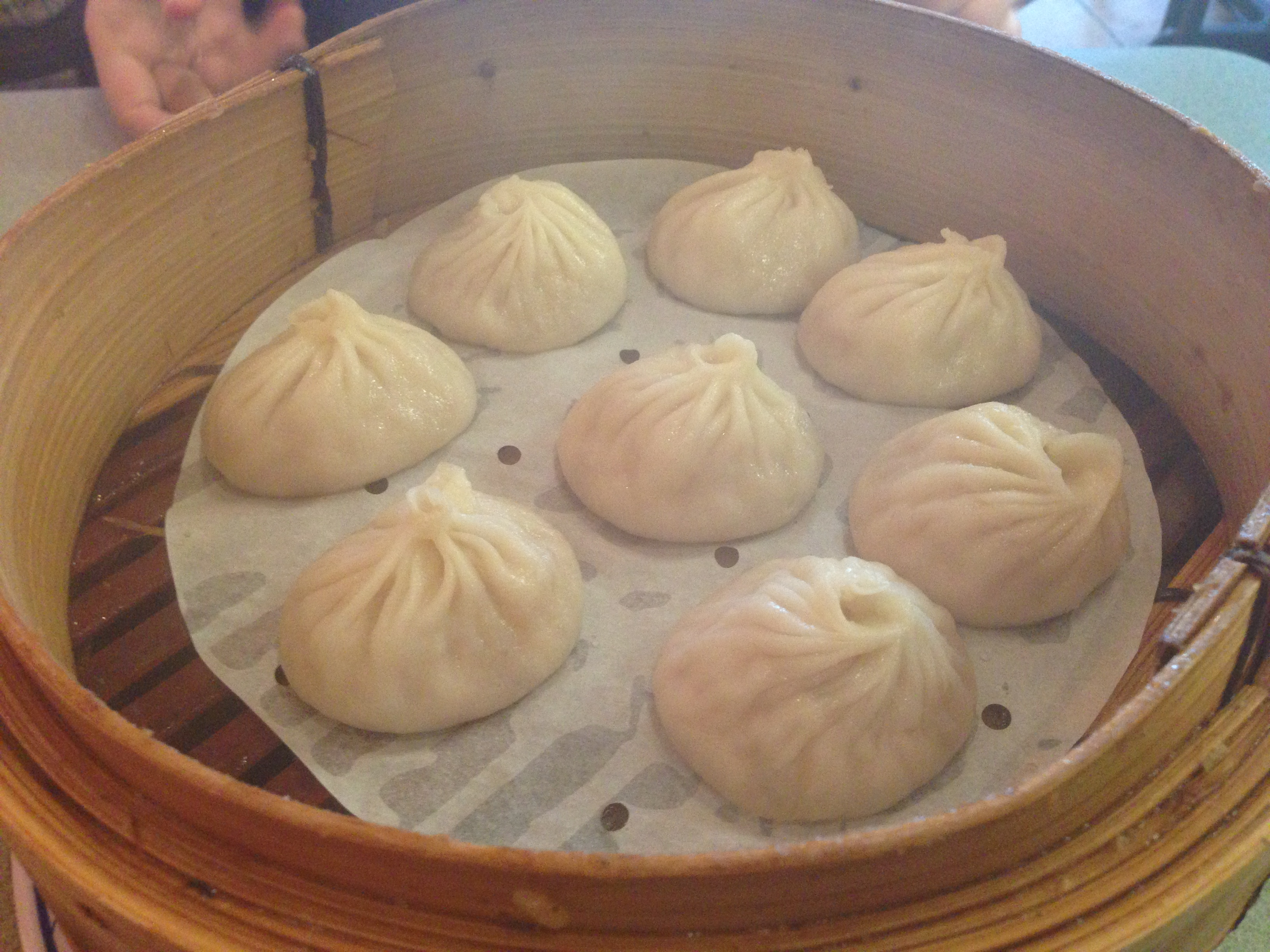
Chinese soup dumplings in bamboo steamer basket

Tangbao are Chinese dumplings filled with soup; the most famous of these are the steamed xiaolongbao (小籠包) of Jiangsu cuisine. Xiaolongbao are made of either leavened or unleavened dough, filled with minced pork or meat aspic filling, and steamed to melt the gelatinous filling back into broth.

==== Yuntun ====
Yuntun and wonton have different meanings and preparation methods in different regions. In Guangdong, Hong Kong and Macao, "yuntun" usually refers to noodles with thin skin and less filling, often used in soups, while in the north, "wonton" generally refers to foods with thicker skin and more filling, often presented in soups or mixed foods. There are obvious differences between the two in shape, taste and use.

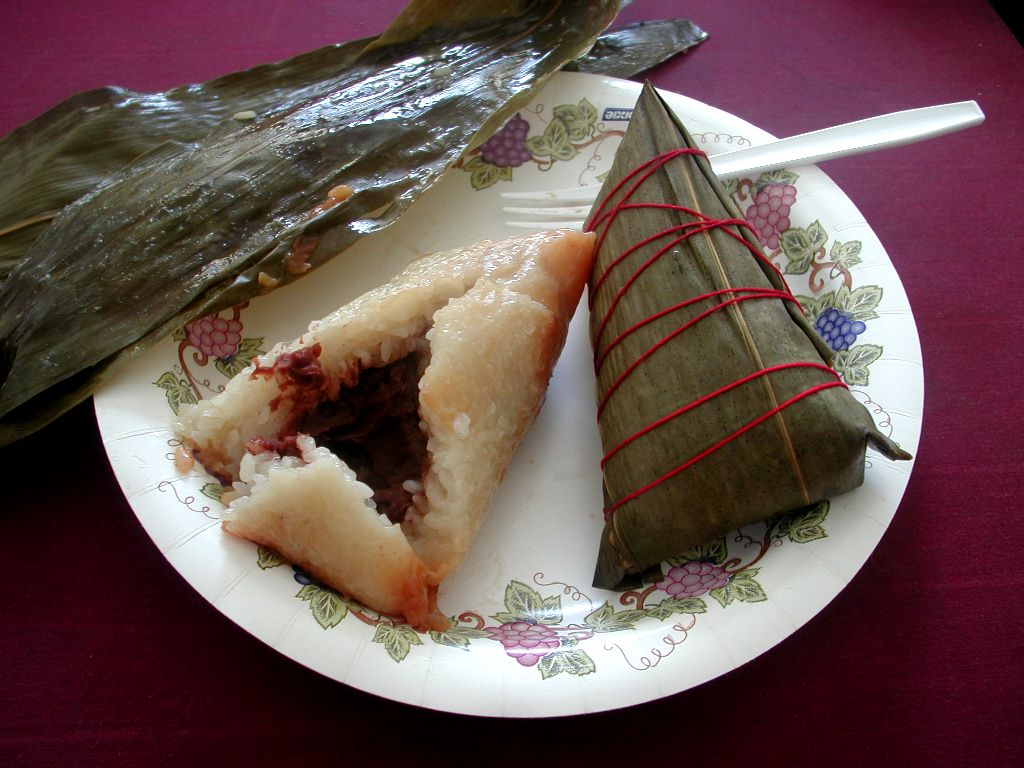
Zongzi wrapped in a bamboo leaf (right) and ready to eat (left)

==== Other Chinese dumplings ====
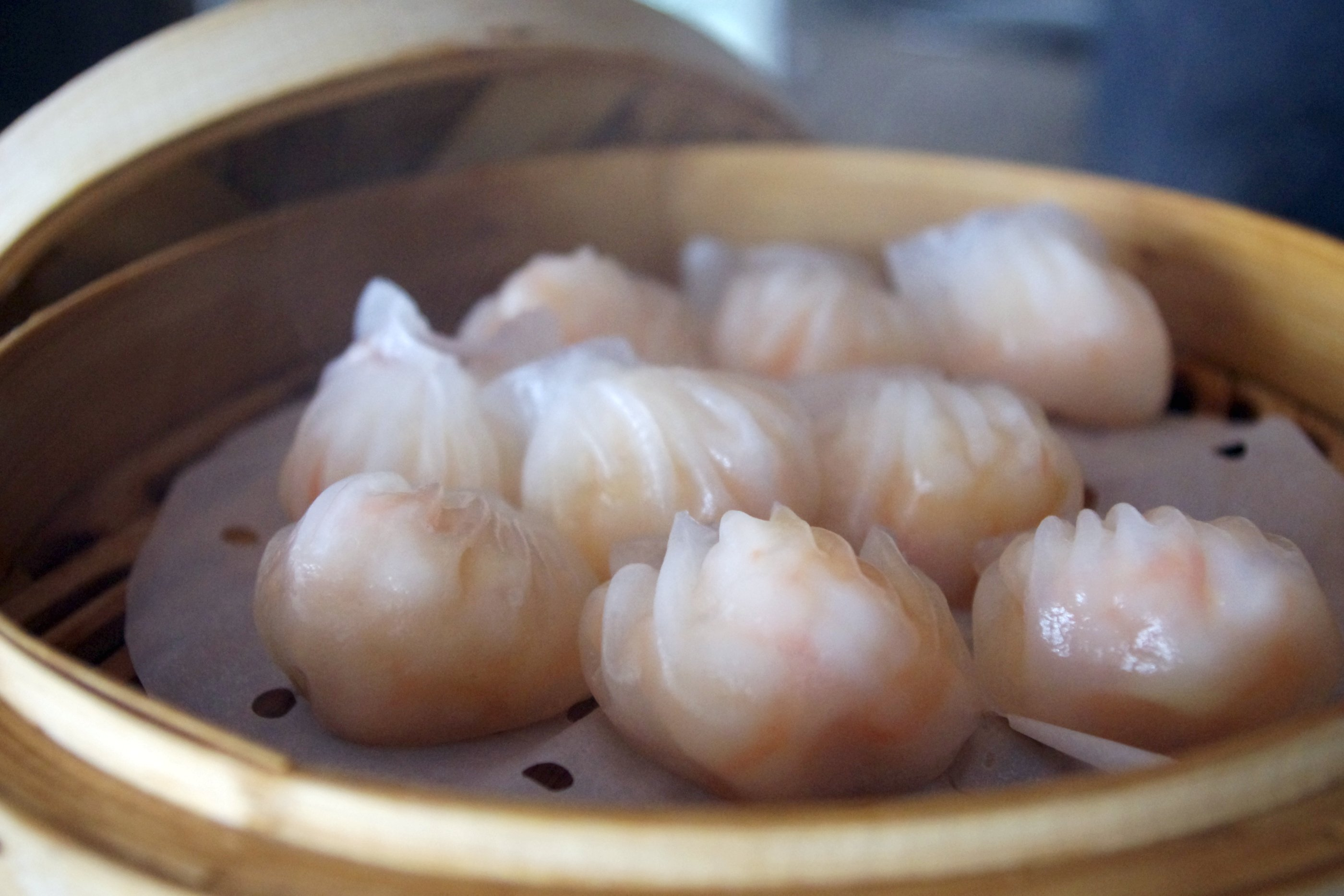
Steamed har gow (shrimp dumplings) served in dim sum

Chinese dumplings can also be based on glutinous rice instead of wheat. Zongzi (粽子) are triangular or cone-shaped, and they can be filled with red bean paste, Chinese dates, or cured meat, depending on the region. Glutinous rice dumplings are traditionally eaten during the Dragon Boat Festival. However, in mainland China, zongzi (粽子) are not considered a type of jiaozi (餃子) per se, which is commonly translated as the word "dumpling".

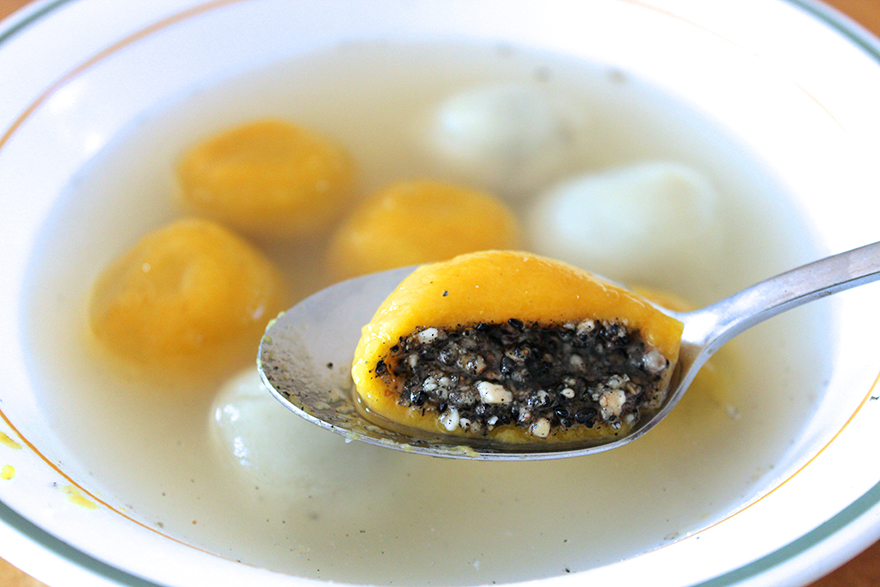
Tangyuan

Chinese cuisine also includes sweet dumplings. Tangyuan (湯圓) are smaller dumplings made with glutinous rice flour and filled with sweet sesame, peanut, or red bean paste. Tangyuan may also be served without a filling. They are eaten on the 15th day of Chinese New Year, or the Lantern Festival. In Southern China, people also eat tangyuan with an angular shape on the winter solstice.

Other kinds of dumplings include har gow, fun guo, siew mai, lo mai gai, crystal dumplings, and several varieties of dim sum.

=== Japanese ===
Dango (団子) is a sweet dumpling made from rice flour, similar to mochi. It is eaten year-round, but different varieties are traditionally eaten in particular seasons. Three to four dango are often served on a skewer.

Gyōza (ギョーザ/餃子) is the Japanese version of the Chinese jiaozi, while chukaman (中華まん) is the Japanese variant of baozi.

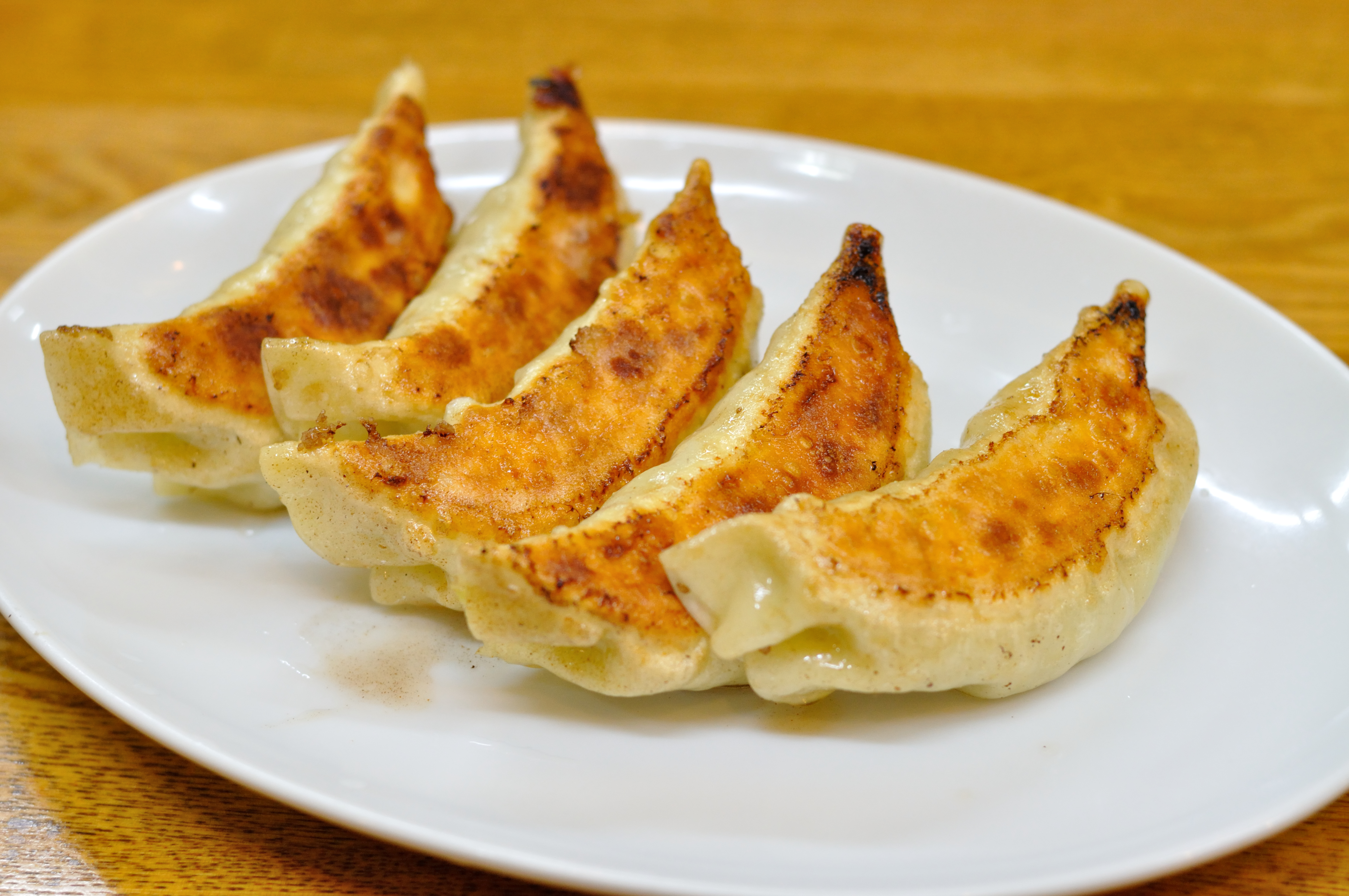
Japanese gyoza

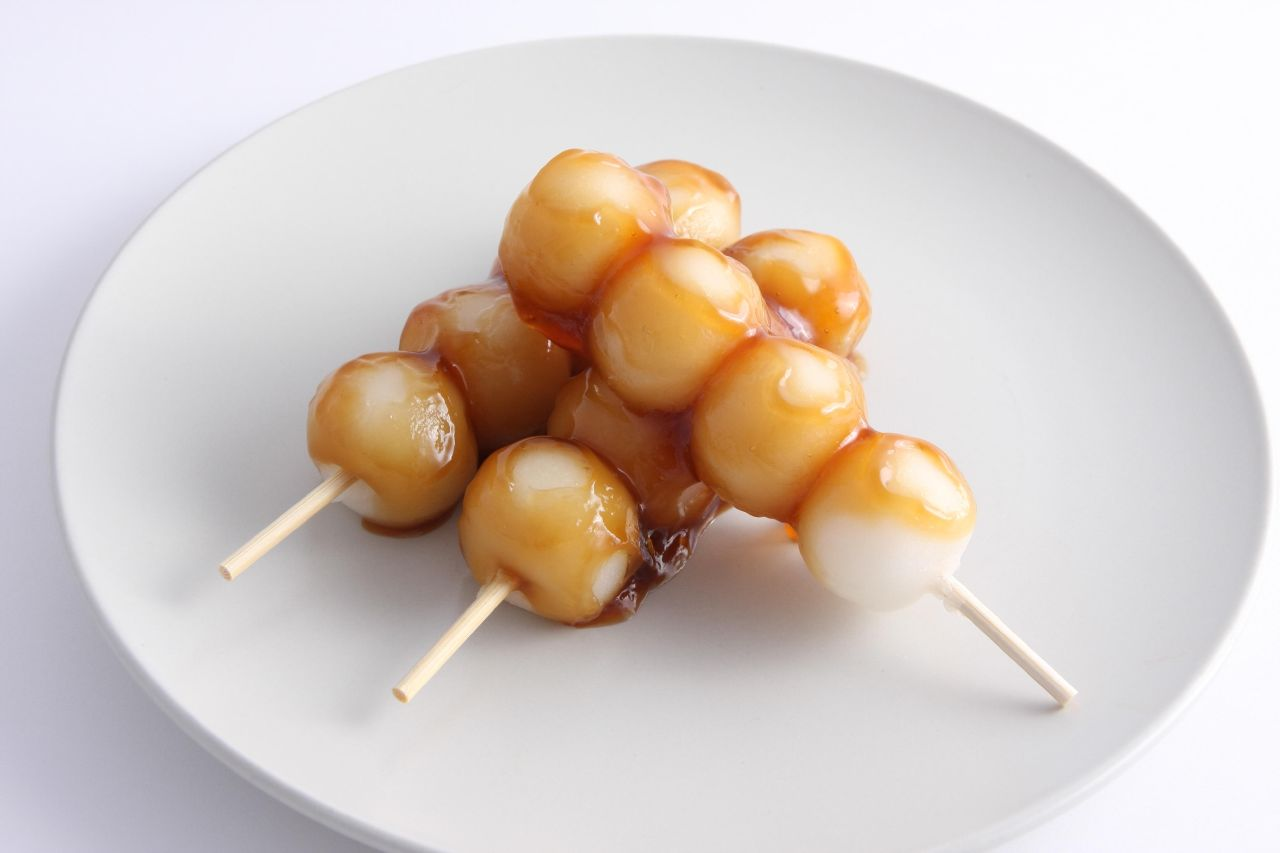
Japanese dango

=== Korean ===
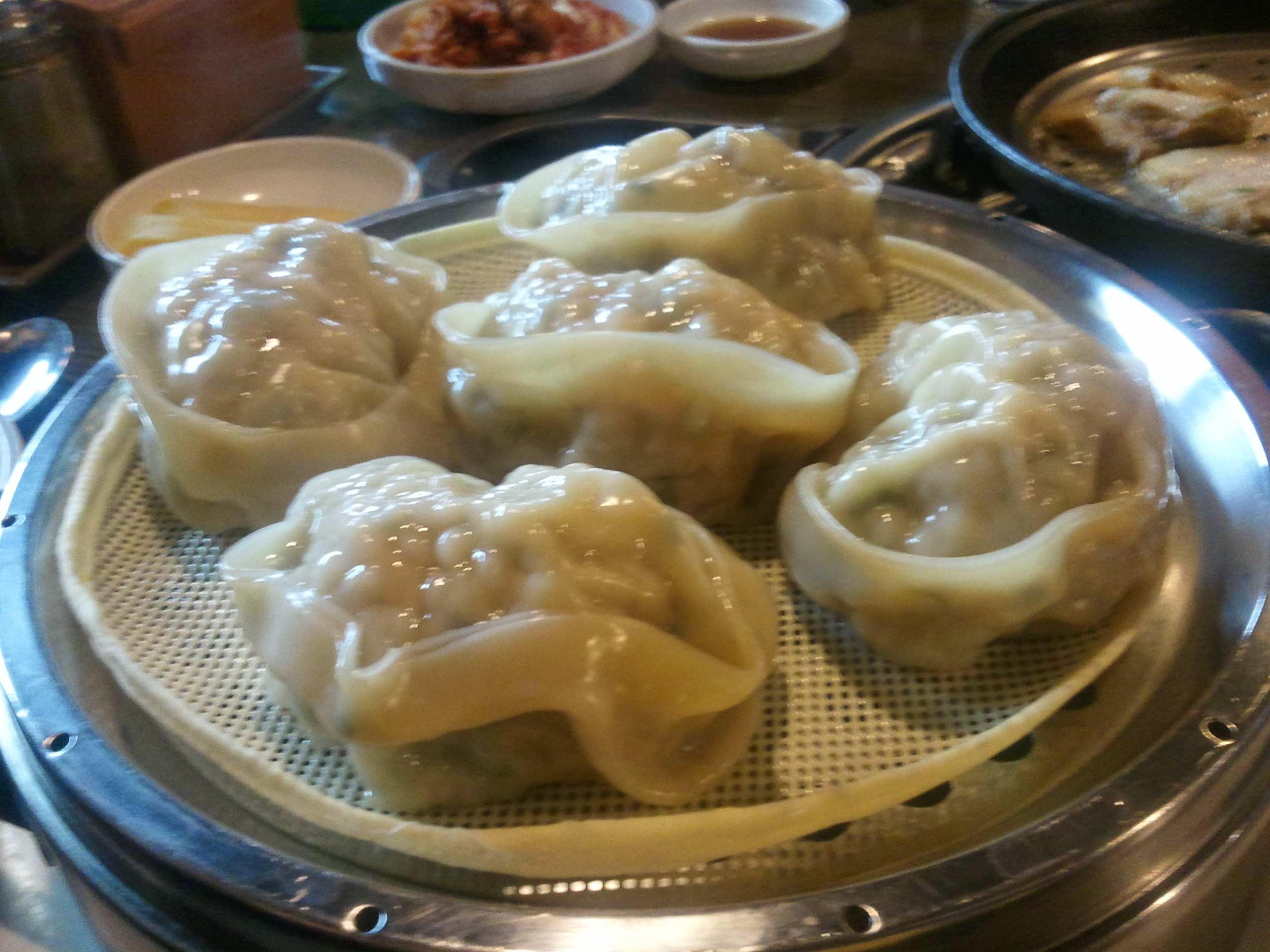
Jjin-mandu (steamed dumplings)

Dumplings in Korean are generally called mandu (만두, 饅頭) and further divided into subtypes such as gyoja (variant to Chinese jiaozi) and hoppang (variant to Chinese baozi). It is thought that the route through which hoppang were introduced from China during the Goryeo Dynasty. In China, it was originally eaten by the civilians and then became popular and spread. But in the Korea, at past it was more part of royal cuisine. Until the early Joseon Dynasty, dumplings were classified as a luxury food and even noblemen could not eat them without permission. Dumplings, noodles, and rice cakes were prohibited except for ancestral rites and Buddhist services. The first record of dumplings in Korea are seen in the Hyowooyeoljeon (효우열전/孝友列傳) in Goryeosa (고려사, 高麗史), and it is said that they were made by a naturalized Khitan during the reign of King Myeongjong of Goryeo. When his father, became ill, the doctor said, 'If you eat your son's meat, you can cure your illness.' Then, he cut off his own thigh meat, mixed it with other ingredients, made dumplings, and fed it to his father. After that his father was cured. In 1185, the king heard the story of his filial piety and ordered the ministers to discuss how to reward him. He erected Hongsalmun Gate to commend him and recorded him into historical records.

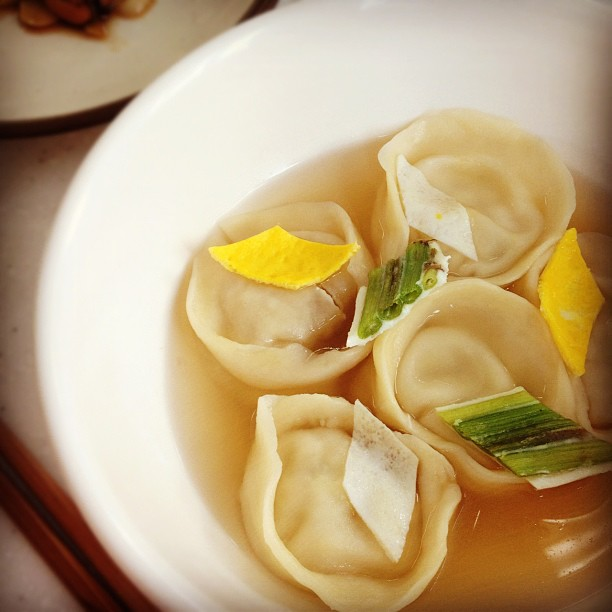
Mandu-guk

They are typically filled with a mixture of ingredients, including ground pork, kimchi, galbi, bulgogi, vegetables, or cellophane noodles, but there are many variations. Mandu can be steamed, fried, or boiled. The dumplings can also be used to make a soup called mandu-guk (만둣국).

Kimchi-mandu (김치만두), filled with chopped kimchi along with ingredients such as pork, is a distinctly Korean variety of mandu. An early precursor, called chimchae-mandu (침채만두, using an older term for kimchi), was recorded in the 1795 court document Wonhaeng Eulmyo Jeongni Uigwe, with a filling of napa cabbage kimchi, pork, beef, pheasant, and tofu wrapped in a dough made from buckwheat and rice flour.

=== Mongolian ===
Buuz (Бууз) are Mongolian steamed dumplings derived from the Chinese baozi. They are generally made of dough, minced garlic and ground beef or ground mutton. Originally one of the main festival foods during the Mongolian Lunar New Year, they are now widely eaten all year. Khuushuur (хуушууp) are the deep-fried version of buuz. They are commonly eaten during the national festival Naadam. Bansh are smaller version of buuz and can be steamed, fried, or boiled in milk tea or soup.

== European ==
=== British and Irish ===
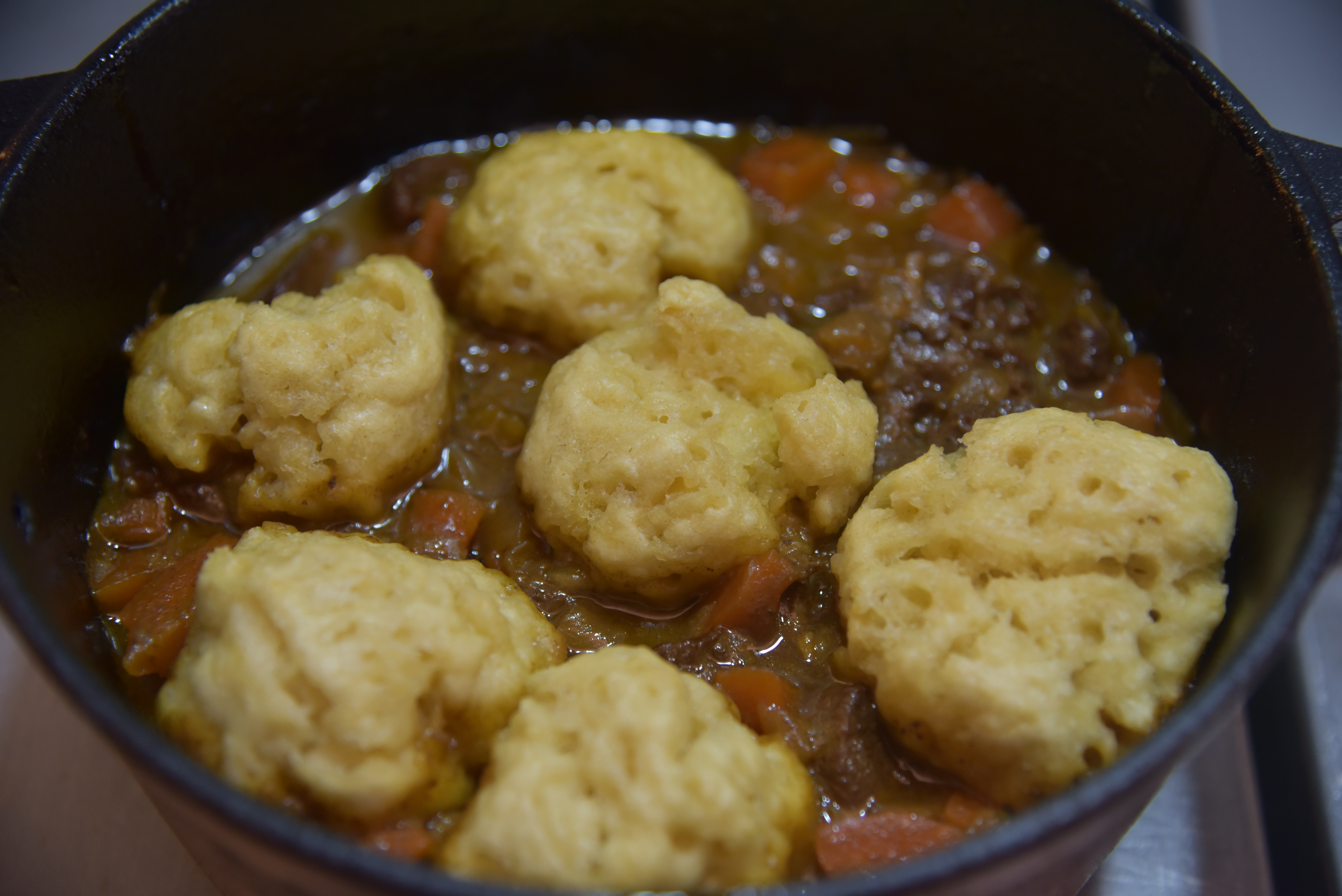
Irish dumplings in a venison stew

Savoury dumplings made from balls of dough are part of traditional British and Irish cuisine. Traditionally dumplings are made from twice the weight of self-raising flour to suet, bound together by cold water to form a dough and seasoned with salt and pepper but can also be made using self-raising flour and butter. Balls of this dough are dropped into a bubbling pot of stew or soup, or into a casserole. They sit, partly submerged in the stew, and expand as they are half-boiled half-steamed for ten minutes or so. The cooked dumplings may be airy on the inside and moist on the outside. The dough may be flavoured with herbs, or it may have cheese pressed into its centre.

The Norfolk dumpling is not made with fat, but from flour and a raising agent. Cotswold dumplings call for the addition of breadcrumbs and cheese, and the balls of dough may be rolled in breadcrumbs and fried, rather than cooked in a soup or stew. Vegetarian dumplings can be made with vegetable suet, a type of shredded vegetable fat. When sweetened with dried fruit and spices, dumplings can be boiled in water to make a dessert. In Scotland, this is called a clootie dumpling, after the cloth.

=== France ===
Raviole du Dauphiné (in English, 'Dauphiné ravioli') are a type of French dumpling. The regional specialty consists of two layers of pasta made out of tender wheat flour, eggs, and water, surrounding a filling of Comté or Emmental cheese, cottage cheese made of cow's milk, butter and parsley. They are usually associated with the historic region of Dauphiné in south central France.

Quenelles de brochet (in English, 'pike dumplings' or 'fish mousse dumplings'), adapted from the German word knödel, are sometimes considered another type from the Rhône-Alpes region. Often used in haute cuisine as a garnish, this spoon-shaped dish consists of a mousse-like paste made from diced pike and a mixture of milk, flour, butter, and egg that is poached and served with a creamy seafood-based sauce that refers to one of its hometowns in Nantua.

=== Central and East European ===
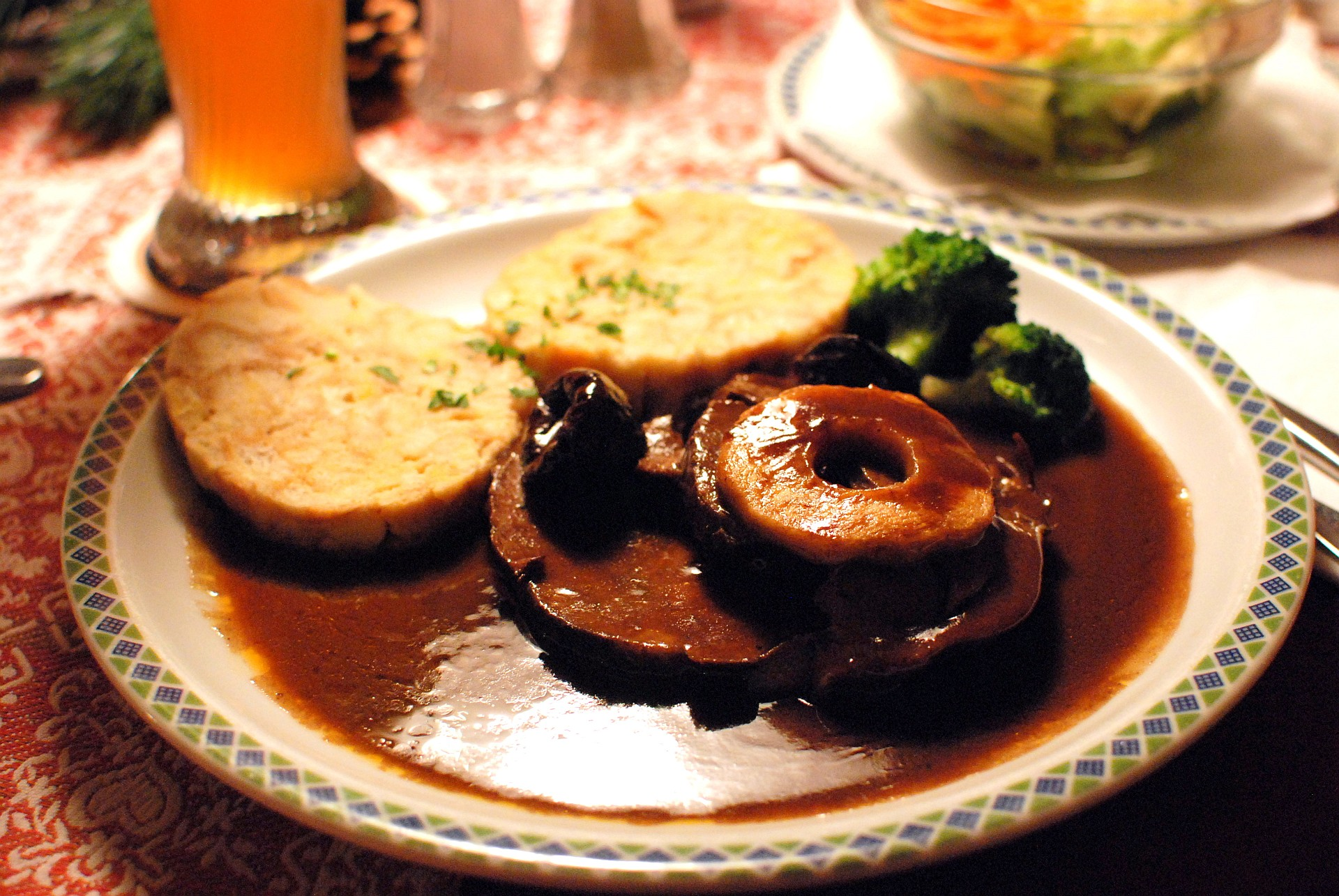
Tyrolean roast wild boar with Buttermilchserviettenknödel (slices of bread dumpling made with buttermilk)

Germany, Poland, Romania, Austria, Ukraine, the Czech Republic and Slovakia boast a large variety of dumplings, both sweet and savoury. A dumpling is called Kloß in northern Germany, Knödel, Nockerl or Knöpfle in southern Germany and Austria, and pieróg in Poland. These are flour dumplings, the most common dumplings, thin or thick, made with eggs and semolina flour, boiled in water. Meat dumplings (called Klopse or Klöpse in north-eastern Germany, Knöpfle and Nocken in southern Germany) contain meat or liver. Liver dumplings are frequent additions to soup. Thüringer Klöße are made from raw or boiled potatoes, or a mixture of both, and are often filled with croutons. Bread dumplings are made with white bread and are sometimes shaped like a loaf of bread, and boiled in a napkin, in which case they are known as napkin dumplings (Serviettenknödel). Potato dumplings, known as Kartoffelklöße, are common in Bavaria, Thuringia, and the Rhineland areas, but they are also consumed all over the country. They generally consist of a combination of cooked and raw potatoes that are cooked in a salted water or pan-seared in butter. A Thuringian type of potato dumplings called Thüringer Klöße, is made with potatoes and bread and is a common variation of potato dumplings. Kartoffelklöße are often served alongside roasted and braised meats, sauerbraten and sauerkraut, goulash and rouladen.

Maultaschen are a Swabian (Baden-Württemberg) specialty food, consisting of an outer layer of pasta dough with a filling traditionally made of sausage meat, spinach, bread crumbs and onions and flavored with various spices. Similar in appearance to Italian ravioli, Maultaschen are usually larger, however, each Maultasche being about 8–12 cm (3–5 inches) across.

The only potato dumpling museum in the world, the Thüringer Kloßmuseum, is in Heichelheim near Weimar in Germany.

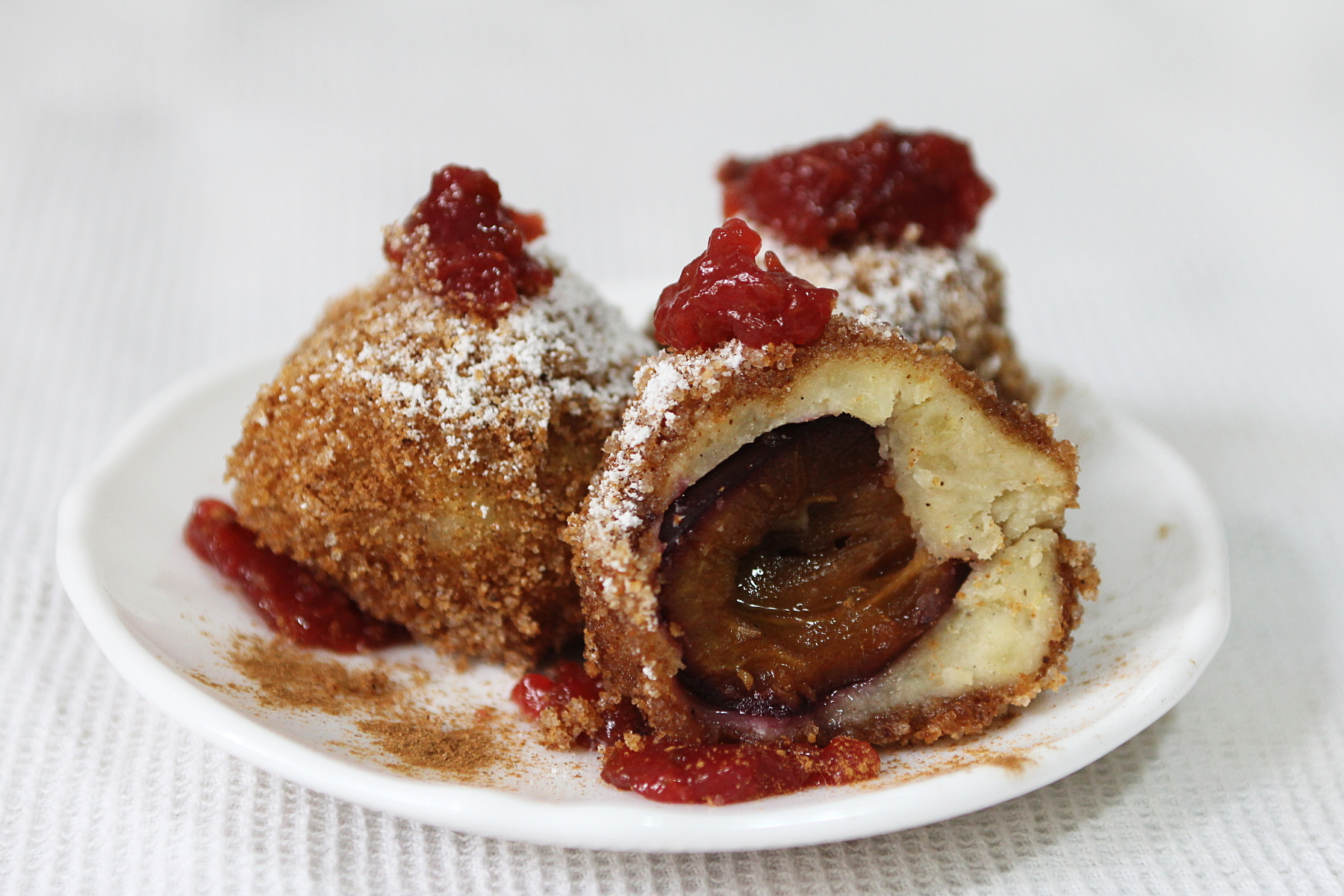
Plum dumplings

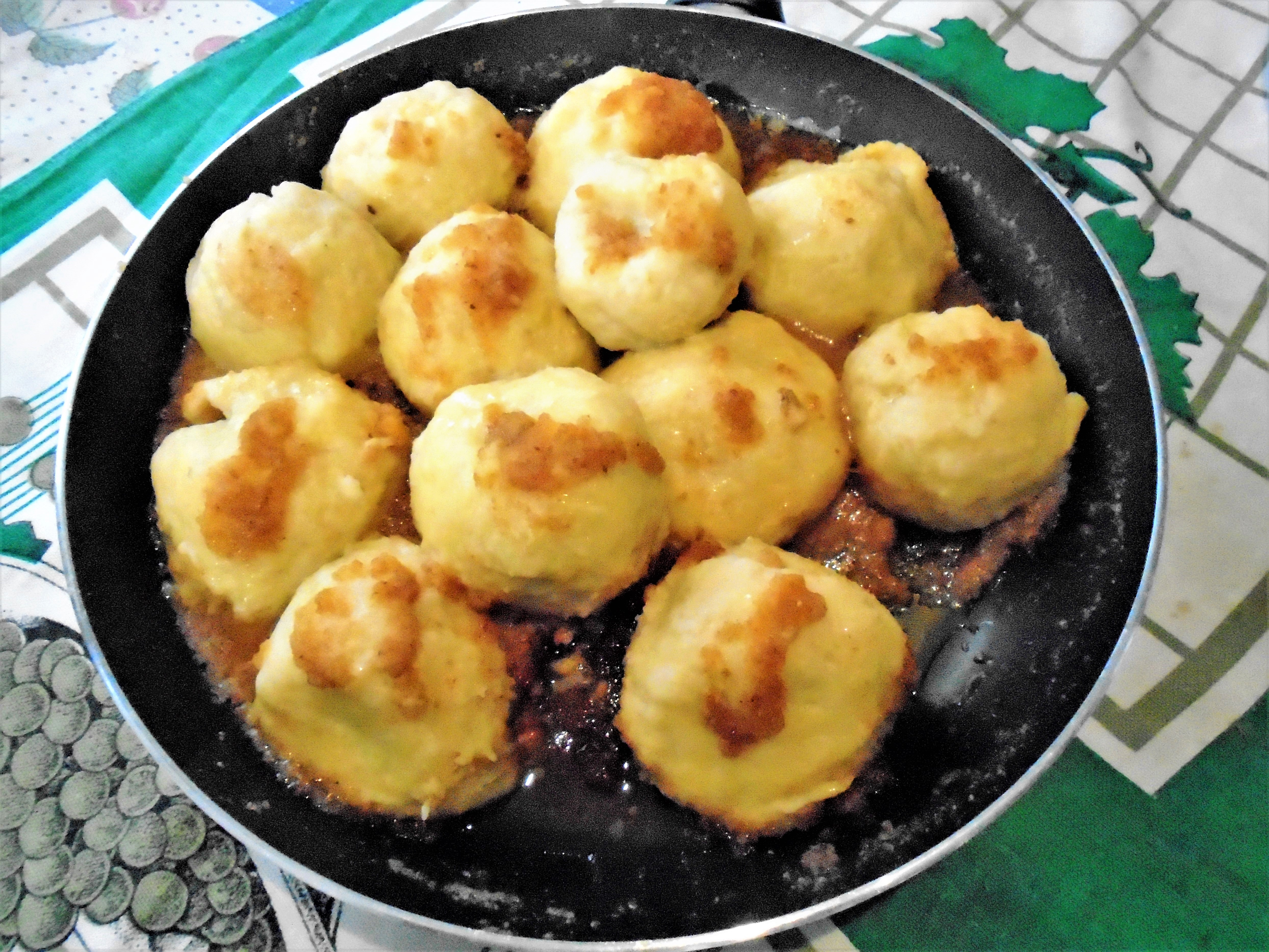
Apricot dumplings

Halušky are a traditional variety of dumplings cooked in the Central and Eastern European cuisines (Czech Republic, Hungary, Romania, Serbia, Slovakia, and Ukraine). These are small lumps cut from a thick flour and egg batter and dropped into boiling water, similar to the German Spätzle, Knöpfle, or Knödel.

In Hungary and Romania, the dumplings usually contain plums or cottage cheese and are called in Hungarian szilvás gombóc, Romanian găluște cu prune, or túrógombóc (Hungarian), colțunași cu brânză (Romanian), depending on the filling. Sweet dumplings are either pre-powdered, or dredged with sugar when a sweeter taste is needed. In Hungary, dumplings are called gombóc and in Austria Zwetschgenknödel. Sweet varieties called gombóc are made with flour and potato dough, which is wrapped around whole plums or apricots, and then boiled and rolled in hot buttered bread crumbs. Shlishkes or krumpli nudli are small boiled potato dumplings made from the same potato dough as sweet plum dumplings, also rolled in hot buttered bread crumbs.

Bryndzové halušky, considered the Slovak national dish, are small potato dumplings without a filling, served with salty sheep's cheese on top. The same dumplings are also used to create a similar dish, strapačky. Also available are their related stuffed version called pirohy, usually filled with bryndza (bryndzové pirohy), quark cheese, potatoes, onions, cabbage, mushrooms, or meat.

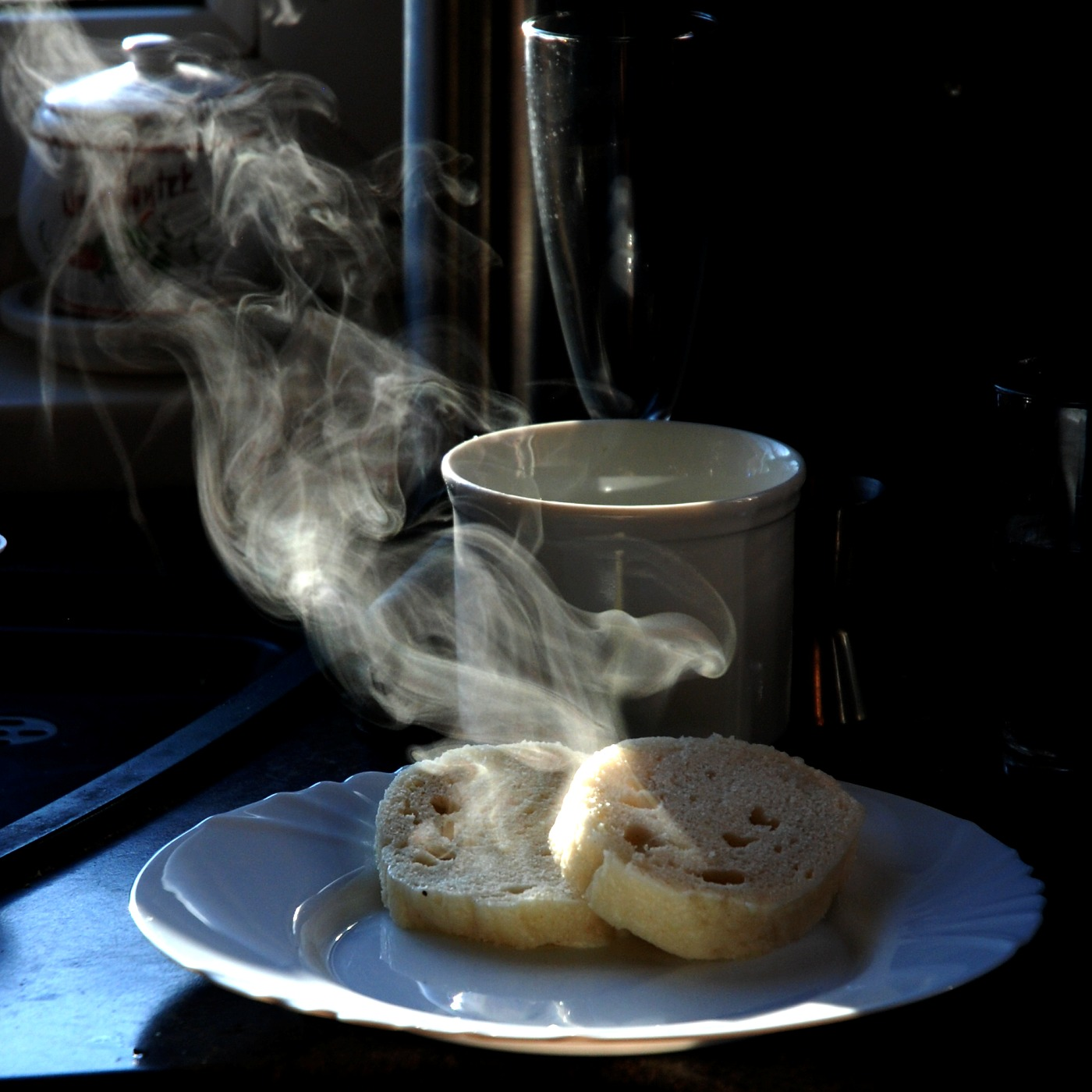
Slices of Czech knedlík

In Czech cuisine, dumplings have two main forms:

- Knödel is called in Czech knedlík and in Slovakia knedľa. It can be either houskový (bread) or bramborový (potato) knödel. These dumplings are boiled in loaf shape and then cut in slices and are part of many Czech national dishes such as Vepřo knedlo zelo or Svíčková na smetaně.
- Ovocné knedlíky (ball-shaped knedle) filled in with fruit: plums, strawberry, blueberry etc. Meal is completed on plate with grated quark, melted butter and powder sugar.

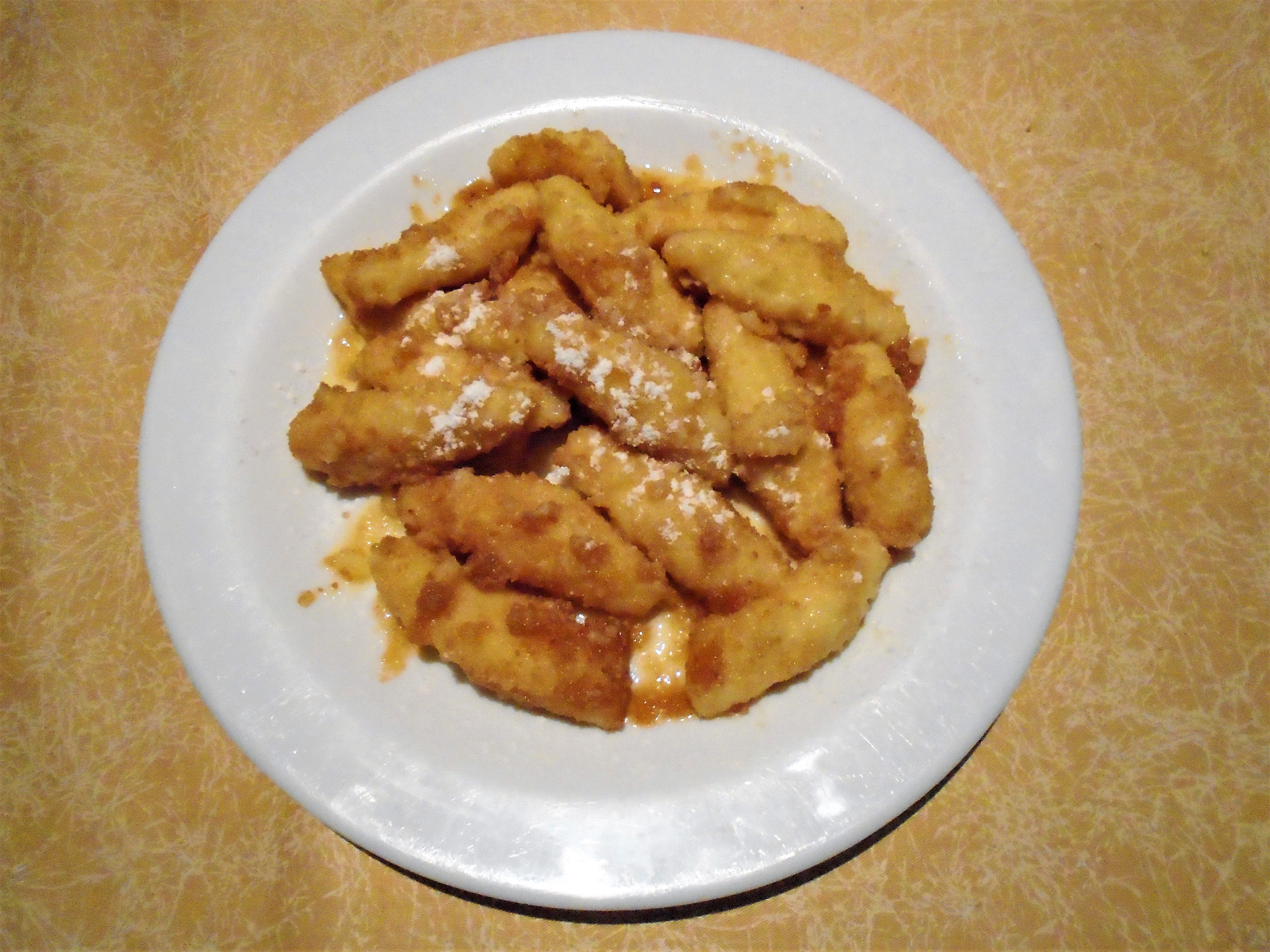
A kind of potato-dough dumplings from Međimurje, northern Croatia

Idrijski žlikrofi are Slovenian dumplings, regionally located in the town of Idrija. They are made from dough with potato filling and have a characteristic form of a hat. Žlikrofi are made by a traditional recipe from the 19th century, but the source of the recipe is unknown due to lack of historical sources. The dish may be served as a starter or a side dish to meat based dishes. Žlikrofi were the first Slovenian food to be classified as a Traditional speciality guaranteed dish.

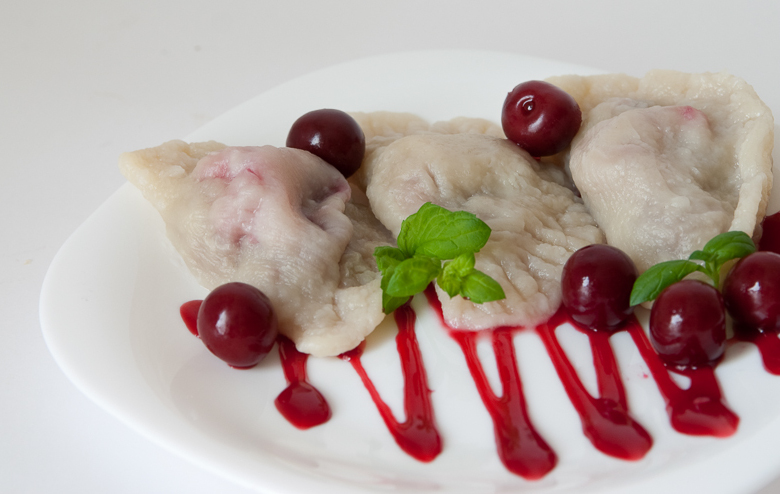
Ukrainian varenyky filled with sour cherry

Pierogi of Poland and varenyky of Ukraine are ravioli-like crescent-shaped dumplings filled with savoury or sweet filling. Varenyky are usually boiled or steamed. Pierogi are often fried after boiling.

"Little ears", variously called uszka in Poland, ushki (ушки) in Russia, vushka (вушка) in Ukraine, and vushki (вушкі) in Belarus, are folded ring-shaped dumplings similar in shape to Italian tortellini or Jewish kreplach. They are stuffed with meat or mushrooms and traditionally served in borshch or clear soup. In Romania, "little ears" (Romanian: urechiuşe) are also served in dumpling soup (supă de găluşte)

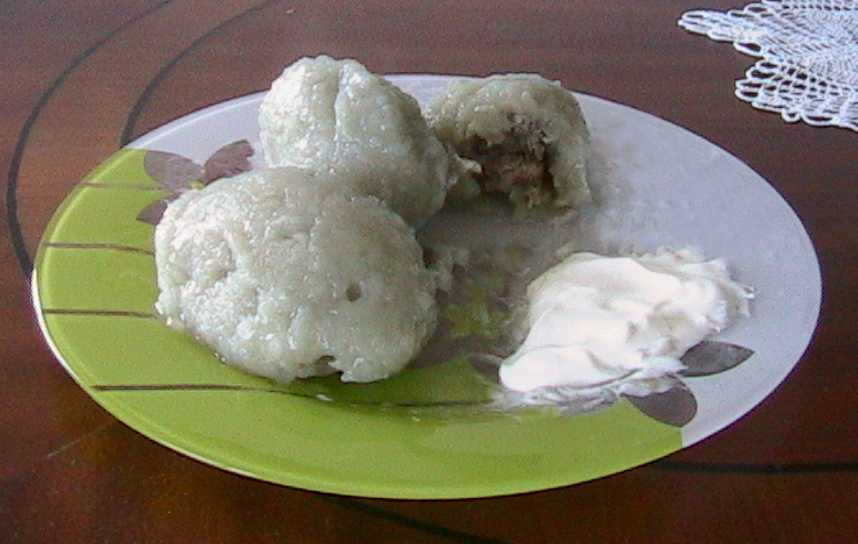
Lithuanian potato dumplings – cepelinai

Lithuanian dough dumplings are called koldūnai and virtiniai. They are usually filled with meat or curd. One of the varieties is called šaltanosiai, "cold nosed ones", and is made with blueberry filling. There are also potato dumplings called cepelinai or didžkukuliai, filled with meat or curd inside, served with soured cream. A similar dish exists in Belarus that is called klyocki (клёцкі).

Russian pelmeni are smaller than varenyky and made only of minced meat with addition of onions and spices. Sometimes the meat used is only beef, in other recipes is a mixture of beef with pork or mutton, while in Siberia the filling often includes venison. Pelmeni should be juicy inside. They are unrelated to the pasta with which they are sometimes compared as it is a savoury main dish. They are usually boiled in water with spices and salt, or in meat bouillon, sometimes fried before serving. They are often served with plenty of sour cream.

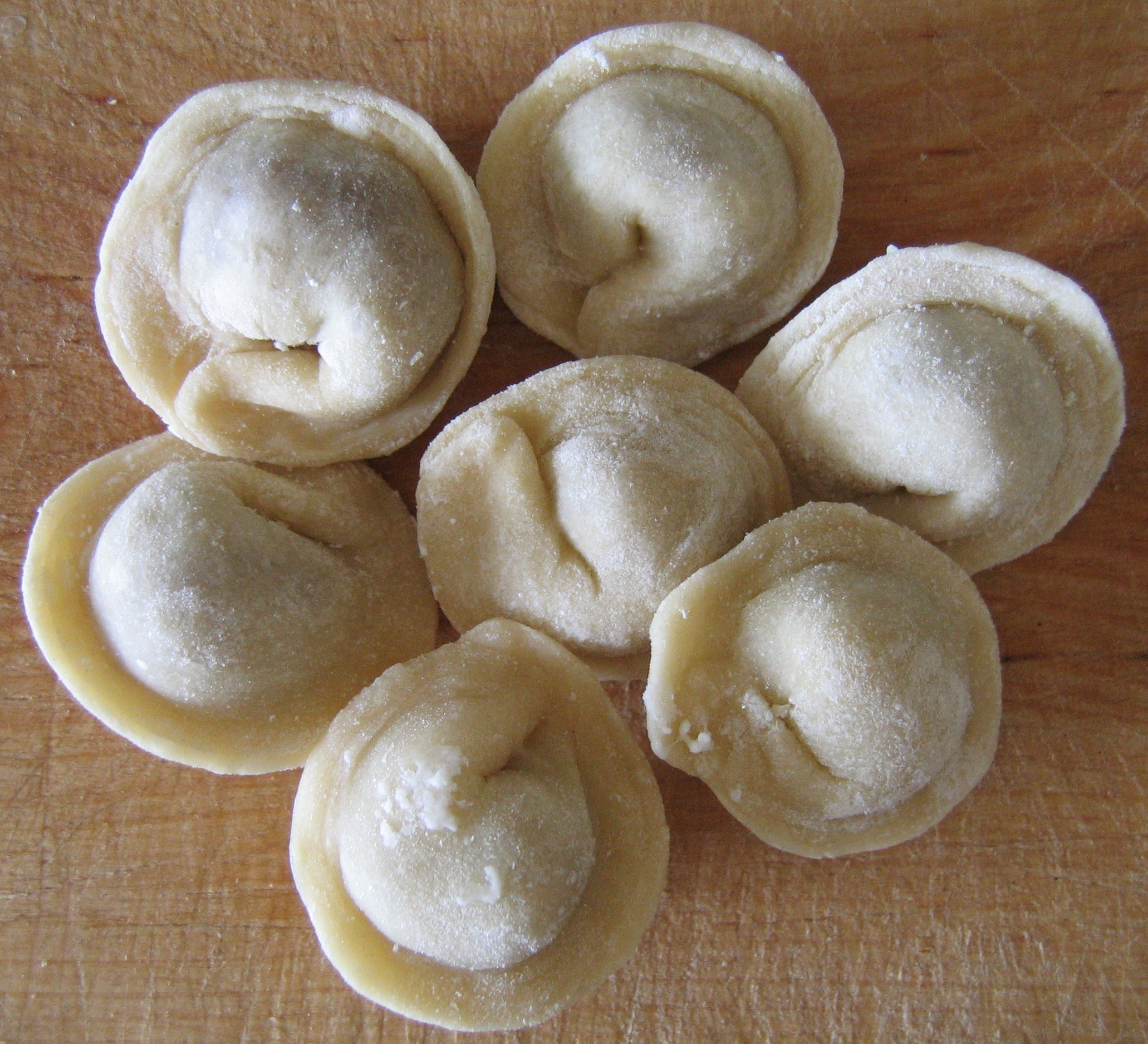
Pelmeni ready for boiling

An important difference between pelmeni, varenyky, and pierogi is the thickness of the dough shell — in pelmeni this is as thin as possible, and the proportion of filling to dough is usually higher. Pelmeni are never served with a sweet filling, which distinguishes them from varenyky and pierogi, which sometimes are. Also, the fillings in pelmeni are usually raw, while the fillings of vareniki and pierogi are typically precooked.

The word pelmeni is derived from pel'n'an' (пельнянь) – literally "ear bread" in the Uralic Komi, Udmurt and Mansi languages. It is unclear when pelmeni entered the cuisines of the indigenous Siberian people and when they first appeared in Russian cuisine. One theory suggests pelmeni, or stuffed boiled dumplings in general, originated in Siberia, possibly a simplified adaptation of the Chinese wonton (in some dialects called bāomiàn, 包面). Pelmeni are particularly good means of quickly preserving meat during the long Siberian winter, especially eliminating the need to feed livestock during the winter months.

The main difference between pelmeni and momo is their size—a typical pelmeni is about 2 to 3 centimetres (0.79 to 1.18 in) in diameter, whereas momo are often at least twice that size.

In Siberia, especially popular with the Buryat peoples are steamed dumplings called pozi (buuz in Mongolian, from Chinese: 包子; pinyin: bāozi). They are usually made with an unleavened dough, but are often encountered leavened. The traditional filling is meat, but the kind of meat and how it is processed varies. In Mongolia, mutton is favored, and is chopped rather than ground; pork and beef mixes are more common in Russia.

Manti, samsa, chiburekki, and belyashi are all well-known imported dumplings.

=== Cypriot ===
In Cypriot cuisine, dumplings are called ravioli (ραβιολες) and are pasta that contains the Cypriot cheese halloumi (χαλούμι). They look like some types of Italian ravioli.

=== Italian ===
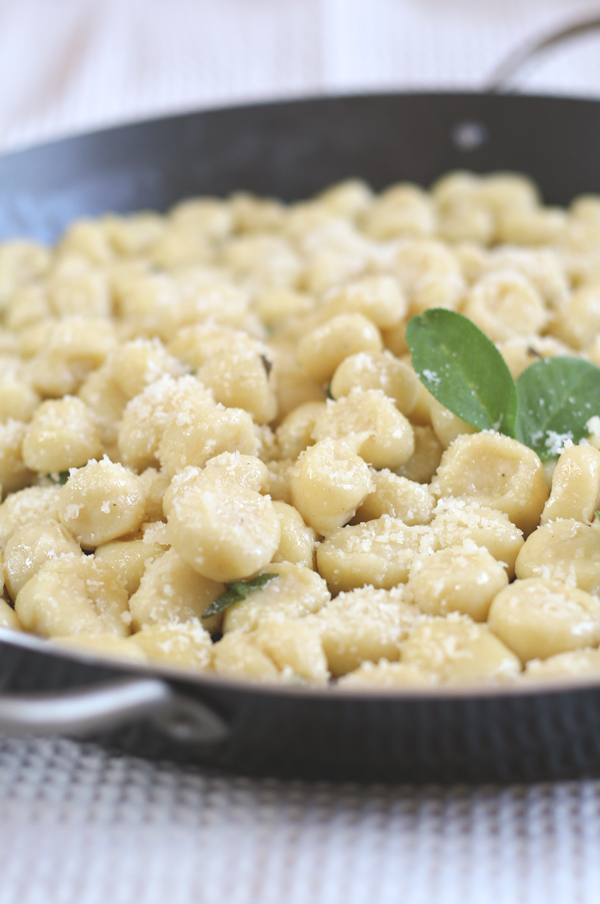
Gnocchi

The fifth-century Roman cookbook Apicius contains a recipe for roasted pheasant dumplings.

Filled pastas such as ravioli and tortellini fit the basic definition of a dumpling: these are pockets of pasta enclosing various fillings (cheese, mushrooms, spinach, seafood, or meat). Instead of being made from a ball of dough, the dough is rolled flat, cut into a shape, filled with other ingredients, and then the dough is closed around the filling.

Seadas, a type of savoury dessert, are semolina dumplings filled with pecorino sardo.

Gnocchi is a different kind of Italian dumpling. The word gnocchi literally means "lumps", and they are rolled and shaped from a mixture of egg with potato, semolina, flour, or ricotta cheese (with or without spinach). The lumps are boiled in water and served with melted butter, grated cheese, or other pasta sauces. Gnocchi are frequently added to soup.

=== Maltese ===
Maltese ravioli (ravjul) are pockets of pasta filled with ricotta cheese or ġbejniet.

Pastizzi and qassatat are pockets of dough that can be filled with a variety of fillings, usually ricotta (irkotta) or mashed peas.

=== Scandinavian ===
==== Norwegian ====
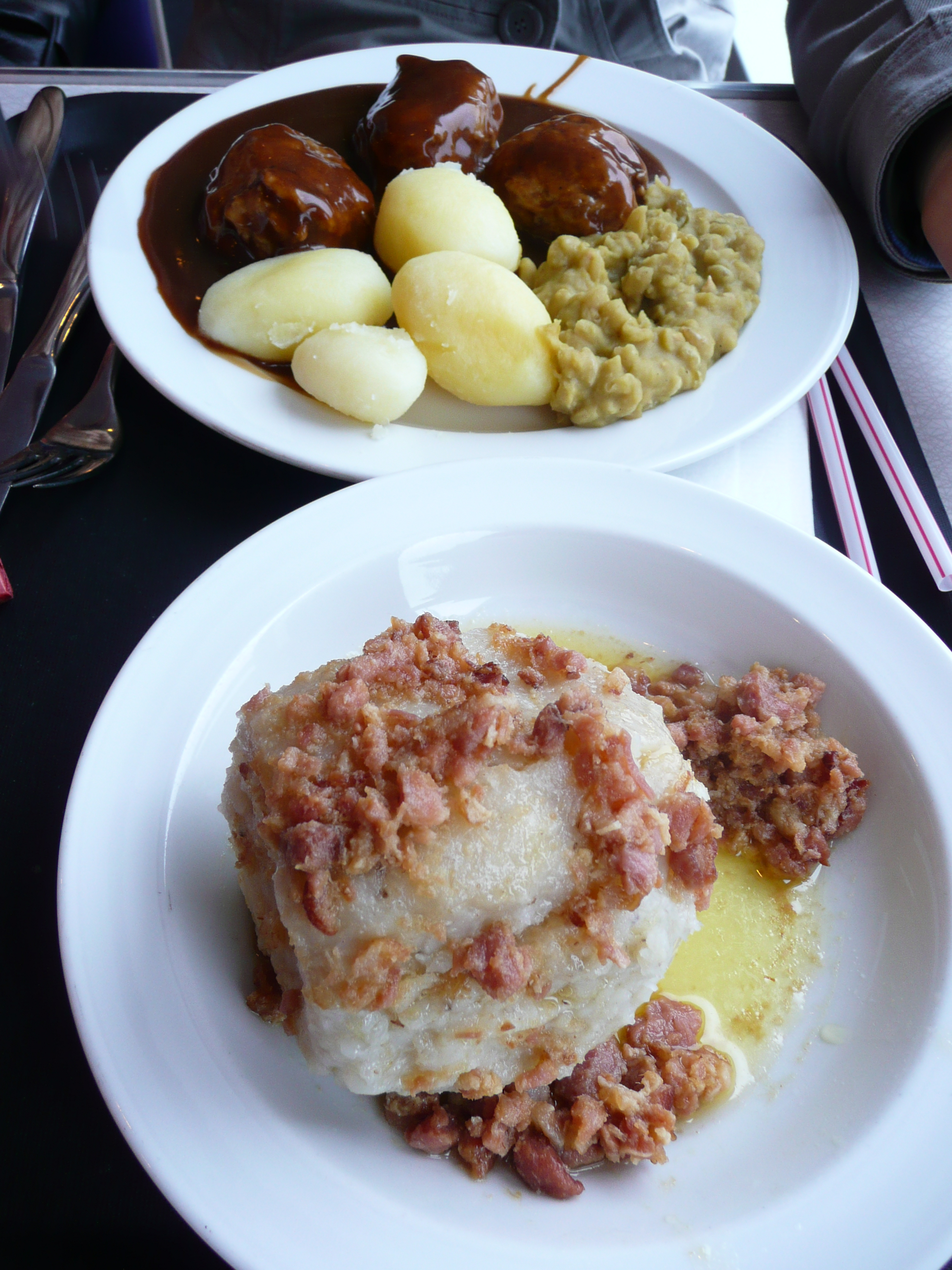
Norwegian raspeball and kjøttkake

In Norwegian cuisine, dumplings have a vast variety of names, as the dialects differ substantially. Names include potetball, klubb, kløbb, raspeball, komle, kumle, kompe, kumpe, kodla, kudle, klot, kams, ball, baill, komperdøse, kumperdøse, kompadøs, ruter, ruta, raskekako, risk, klotremat, krumme and kromme. They are usually made from crushed potatoes mixed with various types of flour, often with an emphasis on barley and wheat. In some local recipes the potatoes are dehydrated, while in others there is a mixture of raw and boiled potatoes. Occasionally they are filled with salted pork. Depending on local tradition, dumplings can be sided with syrup, lingonberry jam, swede and often meat if the dumplings do not have meat filling. Leftovers are often fried in butter and served with granulated sugar.

One distinct variety particular to Møre og Romsdal is blandaball (lit. mixed ball), where equal parts potatoes and fish are used. The fish is commonly pollack or haddock.

==== Swedish ====
In Swedish cuisine, potato dumplings of originally German origin have several regional names, mainly depending on the type of flour used. When the potato is mixed with wheat flour, which is more common in southern Sweden, it is called kroppkaka. In Blekinge and parts of the island of Öland, it is traditionally made from grated raw potato, which makes it greyish in colour, while on Gotland and in Småland it is predominantly made from mashed boiled potato, and is thus whiter in colour. The kroppkaka is usually filled with diced, smoked bacon and chopped, raw onion, and is often spiced with allspice.

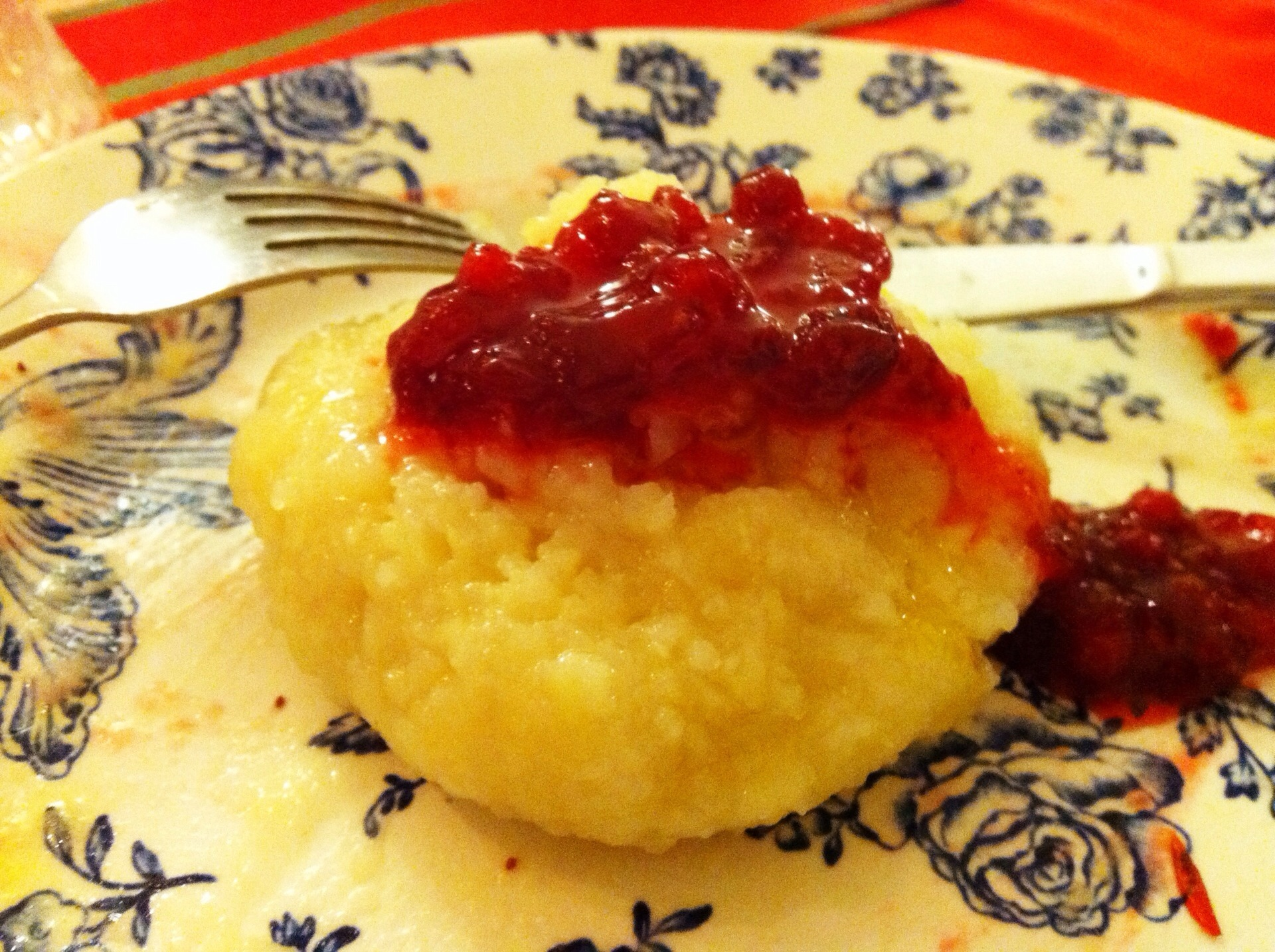
Swedish palt, served with butter and lingonberry jam

When the potato is mixed with barley flour, which is traditional in northern Sweden, it is known as palt in Lapland, Västerbotten and Norrbotten, and as kams in Jämtland, Ångermanland and Medelpad. Originally, palt was eaten all over Sweden and was made from barley or rye flour alone, but during the 19th century, when potato was added and wheat became more common and inexpensive, the northern recipes retained the original name, while kroppkaka, which had always been the name used on Öland for the flour dumpling, became the name for the variant in southern Sweden.

Palt and kams is usually filled with diced, unsmoked bacon. However, sometimes fried bacon is served on the side of unfilled palt or kams, which then is known as flatpalt or flatkams, as the lack of filling makes it flatter. The most well-known palt variant is the Pitepalt from Piteå. In Dalarna, where the dish is known as klabbe, it is still made without potatoes and is never filled. Klabbe is instead served with diced bacon on the side.

A variant of palt is blodpalt, where pig, beef or reindeer blood is mixed into the dough. Other palt variants are leverpalt, with minced liver added to the dough, and njurpalt, with diced kidney mixed into the bacon filling. Blodpalt also existed across the country originally, and has been found in Iron Age graves in Halland.

The filled kroppkaka, palt or kams ball – as well as the flatter, unfilled flatpalt, flatkams and klabbe – is dropped into boiling salted water and cooked until it floats. It is traditionally served warm with melted butter and lingonberry jam, although in some parts of southern Sweden the melted butter is replaced by half cream (a mix of milk and cream) or a warm milk sauce, and in parts of northern Sweden the butter is replaced by a warm milk sauce spiced with messmör. Leftover kroppkaka is often served halved and fried.

Unfilled flour dumplings for use in soup are called klimp if the flour is wheat, but mjölpalt if the flour is barley or rye.

== Western Asian ==
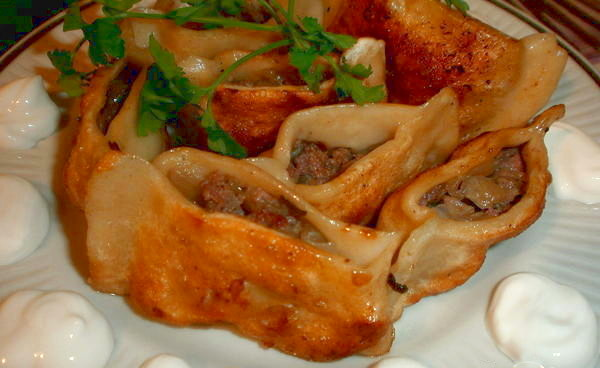
Armenian boraki

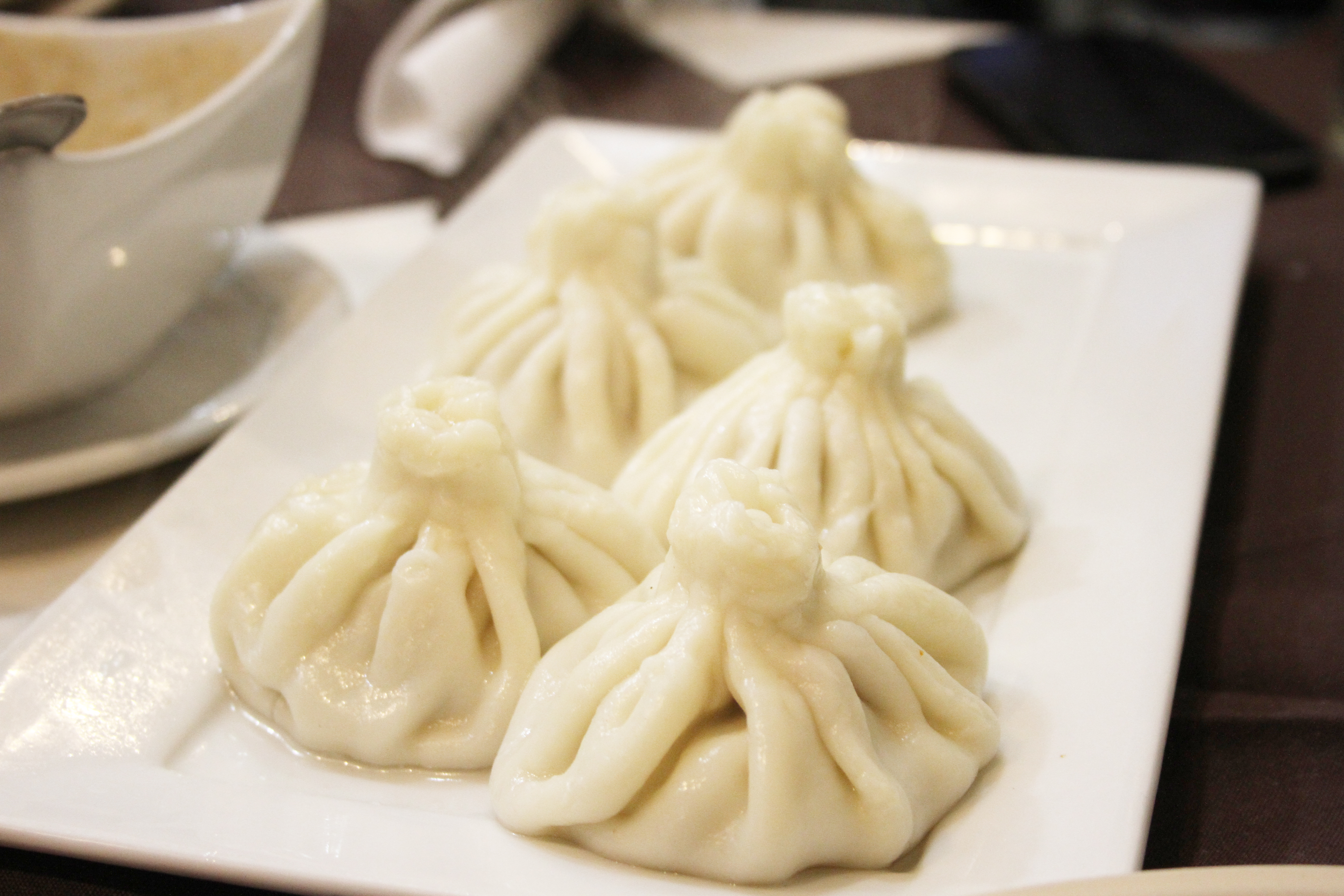
Georgian khinkali

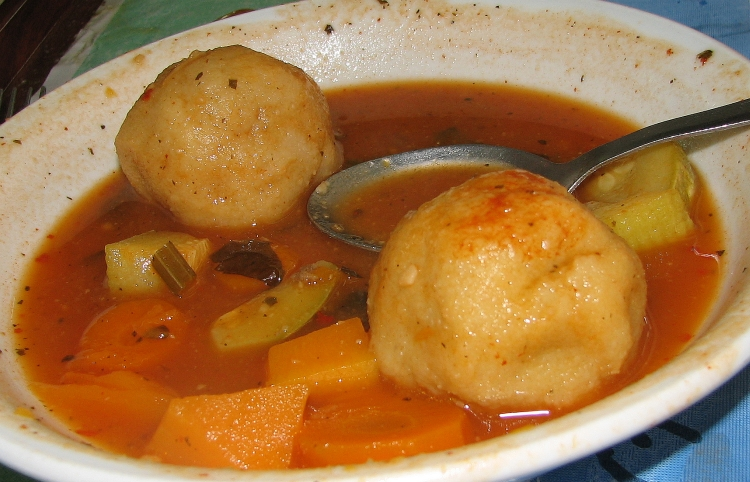
Iraqi kubbeh

=== Arabic ===
- Asida
- Qatayef
- Shishbarak
- Gabout, (Arabic: قبوط) stuffed flour dumplings in a thick meat stew.

=== Caucasian ===
Boraki (Armenian: Բորակի) are a kind of Armenian dumplings typically filled with spiced ground meat and onions, wrapped in thin dough, and often baked, or fried. Boraki are formed as small cylinders with an open top, the cylinders are lightly boiled in broth and then baked, or fried. Thed usually sit in an Armenian sauce called lecho, which consists of bell peppers, tomatoes, onions, garlic, oil, salt, hot peppers and sometimes vinegar. Boraki are served garnished with matzoon and chopped garlic.

Meat-filled manti served with matzoon, sour cream, and broth is called Mantapour (Armenian: մանթապուր). It is a popular soup in Armenia.

Mataz are dumplings in Circassian and some other Caucasian cuisines, closely related to manti. They typically consist of a spiced meat mixture, usually lamb or ground beef, with greens and onions, put in a dough wrapper, either boiled or steamed. Mushrooms, potatoes, or cheese may be used in place of meat.

Khinkali (Georgian: ხინკალი) are Georgian dumplings which originated in the mountain regions of Pshavi, Mtiuleti, and Khevsureti. Varieties of khinkali spread from there across different parts of the Caucasus, now the towns of Dusheti, Pasanauri and Mtskheta are particularly famous for their khinkali. The fillings of khinkali vary with the area. The original recipe consists of only minced meat (lamb or beef and pork mixed), onions, chili pepper, salt and cumin. Modern recipes use herbs like parsley and coriander. Mushrooms, potatoes, or cheese may be used in place of meat. The khinkali is typically consumed first by sucking the juices while taking the first bite, in order to prevent the dumpling from bursting.

Dushbara (Azerbaijan: Düşbərə) is an Azeri soup with tiny lamb-filled dumplings.

=== Jewish ===
- Kreplach
- Knish
- Matzah ball

=== Turkish ===
- Manti

== North America ==
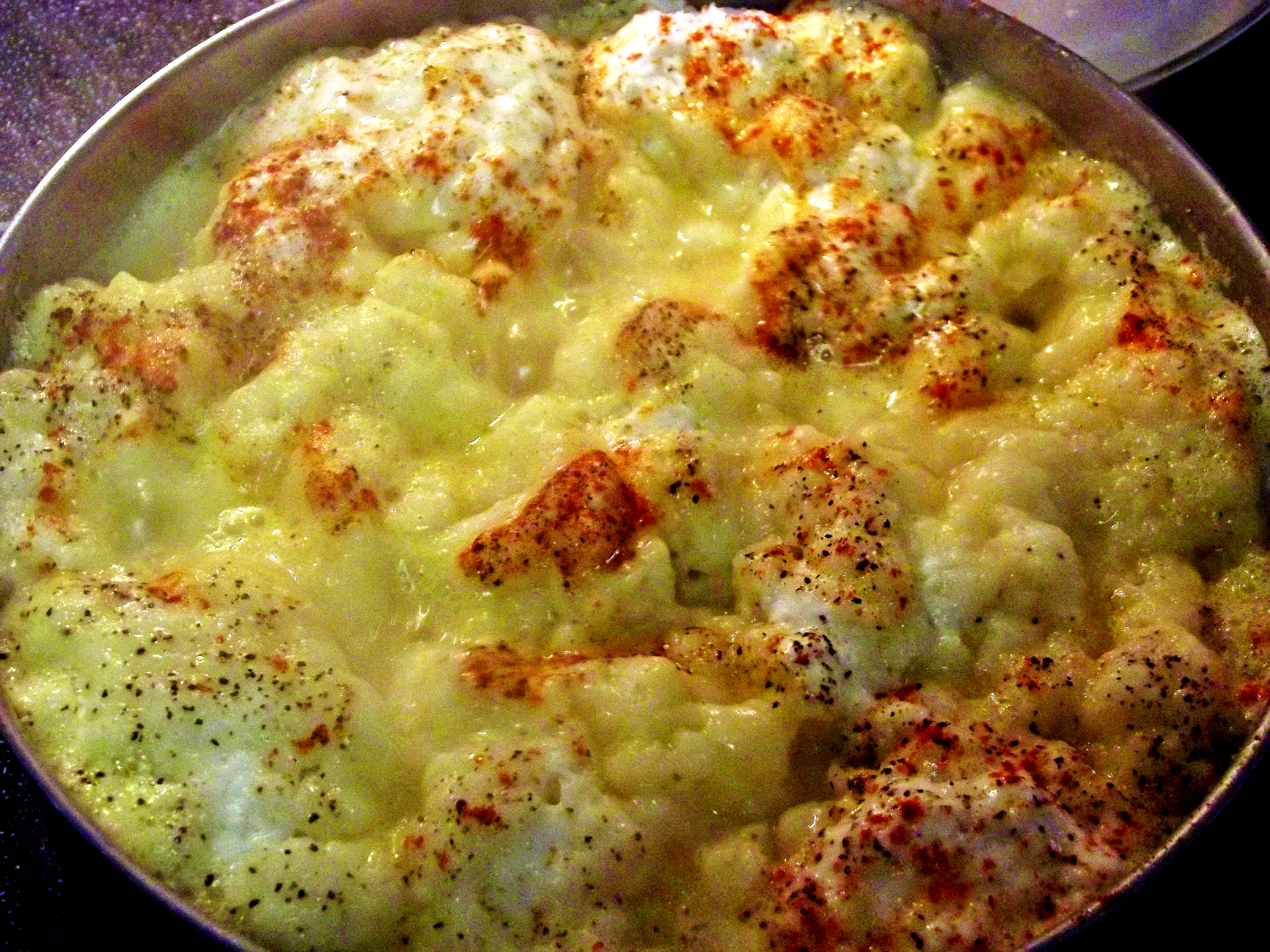
Dropped dumplings simmering for chicken and dumplings, an American comfort food

=== United States ===
Though they have existed around the world much longer, it is believed that one of the reasons dumplings were popularized in the United States was because of the rise of urbanization during the 1800s that led to immigration from places like China, the United Kingdom and Germany that already had some form of the food. Cookbooks from the nineteenth century highlight the importance of factory production in foods like canned biscuits and canned broth that made it more accessible to cook drop dumplings at home. This was especially true for states like the Carolinas, where it began to supersede both regional Indigenous and African-American recipes that previously used a corn base. Precursors include savory, cornmeal dumplings with turnip greens as well as Indigenous pone (in English, meaning 'baked') that dates back as early as the Woodland Period and fruit-based 'slump'. Thus American dumplings can either be of the filled pastry type (which are usually baked), or they may be little pieces of dough added to a savory or sweet dish, in which case they are usually boiled.

Baked dumplings

Baked sweet dumplings are a popular dessert in American cuisine. They are made by wrapping fruit, frequently a whole tart apple, in pastry, then baking until the pastry is browned and the filling is tender. While baking, the dumplings may be surrounded by, and even basted in, a sweet sauce, typically containing brown sugar, butter, and cinnamon or other spices. Baked savory dumplings, in the form of pizza rolls, are a popular prepared snack food.

Boiled dumplings

Boiled dumplings are made by mixing flour, fat, and baking powder with milk or water to form a dough, which may be either rolled out and cut into bite-size pieces, or simply dropped by spoonfuls into the simmering liquid of a savoury soup or stew, or, for dessert dumplings, onto simmering sweetened fruit. The dropped kind are sometimes called "doughboys". When added to chicken and vegetables in chicken broth, the starch in the dumplings serves to thicken the broth into a gravy, creating the popular comfort food chicken and dumplings. Other common savoury pairings, particularly in the Midwestern and Southern US, are turkey, ham, and butterbeans. Popular sweet pairings are strawberries, apples, and blackberries. Dumplings also feature in the regional stews of the midwest and south called "burgoos." Further north, dumplings are frequently served with beef, corned-beef and duck stews, and blueberries are the favourite fruit for dessert dumplings.

=== Canada ===
In Canada, the poutine râpée is a type of filled dumpling made with pork mince inside a flour ball.

== South Asian ==
=== Pakistani ===
- Mamtu

Popular Hunza Cuisine famous throughout the entire country. It is recently been gaining popularity after multiple Hunza restaurants/ stalls opened.

=== Indian ===
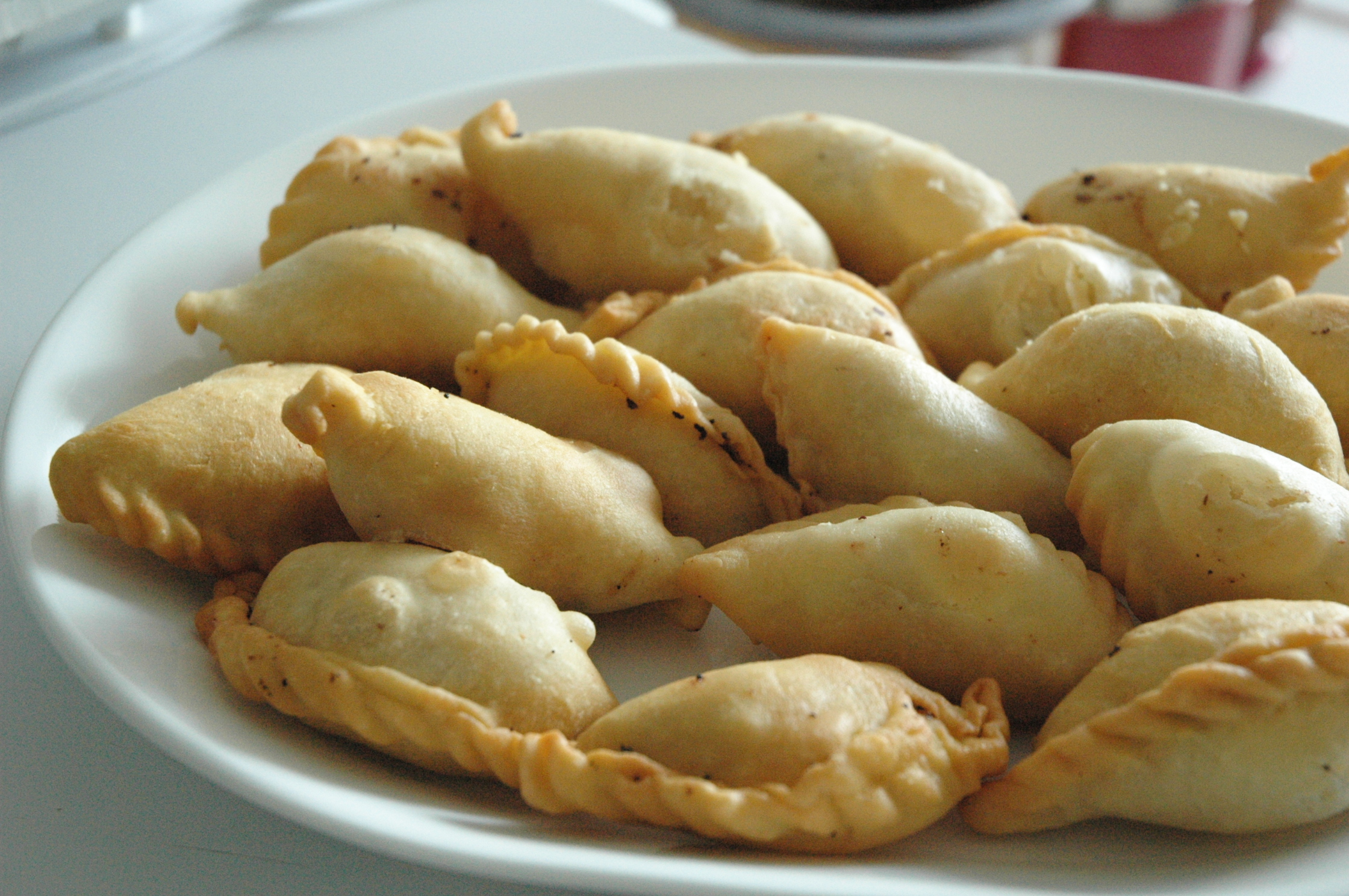
Gujia

Indian cuisine features several dishes that could be characterised as dumplings:

- Ada (Malayalam) is a sweet South Indian dish from Kerala. Scraped coconut mixed with sugar or jaggery is enveloped between the spread rice-dough and steamed. The sweet version of kozhukattai is equally famous in Kerala.
- Bhajia are dumplings sometimes stuffed with vegetables and fruits.
- Gojha (Bhojpuri) is famous in Bhojpuri region and is very similar to dumplings. It is made of rice flour with stuffing of lentils and similar delicacies.
- Gujia (Hindi) is a sweet dumpling made with wheat flour, stuffed with khoya.
- Kachori (Hindi) is a round flattened ball made of fine flour filled with a stuffing of baked mixture of yellow moong dal or urad dal (crushed and washed horse beans), besan (crushed and washed gram flour), black pepper, red chili powder, salt and other spices.
- Karanji (Marathi, Oriya) or Kajjikayi (Kannada, Telugu) or kanoli are fried sweet dumplings made of wheat flour and stuffed with dry or moist coconut delicacies. They are a popular dish among Maharashtrians, Oriyas and South Indians.
- Poornam Boorelu are spherical dumplings filled with a stuffing of chickpea paste mixed with jaggery syrup and cardamom powder. The exterior shell consists of a batter of rice flour and ground black lentils. These are popular in Andhra Pradesh and Telangana.
- Kozhakkattai (Tamil) or kadabu (Kannada), is another South Indian dish that can be sweet, salty or spicy. The outer shell is always steamed sticky rice dough. In the sweet version, a form of sweet filling made with coconuts, boiled lentils and jaggery is used, whereas in the salty version, a mixture of steamed cracked lentils, chillies and some mild spices is used.
- A dumpling popular in Western India and South India is the modak (Marathi, Oriya) or mmdhaka (Kannada) or modagam (Tamil), sugiyan (Malayalam) or kudumu (Telugu), where the filling is made of fresh coconut and jaggery or sugar while the covering is steamed rice dough. It is eaten hot with ghee.
- Nevryo (or neureo) is a sweet dumpling made dominantly in Dakshina Kannada and Udupi districts of Karnataka and Goa, just before Christmas.
- Pidi (Malayalam) is a South Indian dish from Kerala that is usually eaten with chicken curry.
- Pitha (Bhojpuri, Bihari, Oriya, Bengali, Assamese) are stuffed savouries made either by steaming or deep frying. A wide range of pithas are available in eastern and north eastern India.
- Samosa is a popular savoury snack eaten in the Indian subcontinent and Iranian plateau. It is a fried dumpling usually stuffed with mince, vegetables (mainly potatoes) and various other spices. Vegetarian variants of samosas, without the added mince stuffing, are also popular and are sold at most eateries or roadside stalls throughout the country.

=== Nepali ===
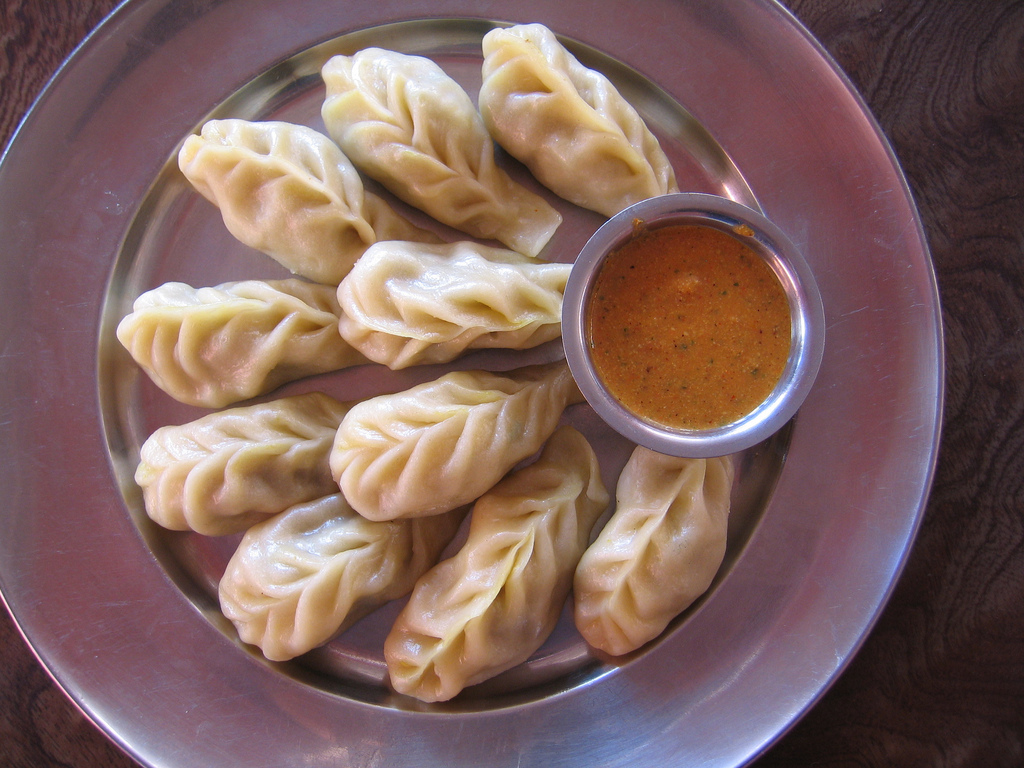
Plateful of Momo (food) in Nepal

In Nepal, steamed dumplings known as momo are a popular snack, often eaten as a full meal as well. They are similar to the Chinese jiaozi or the Central Asian manti. Whether momo originated in Tibet and spread to Nepal or vice versa is unclear, but momo were present in Nepal as early as the fourteenth century. Momo are one of the most common items on the menus of Nepali restaurants, especially in the Kathmandu Valley.

Common fillings for momo are meat, vegetables, and cheese: sweet dessert momo are also made. Momo can be served fried, steamed or grilled. They are usually served with a dipping sauce, known as achar, normally consisting of tomatoes and chillies as the base ingredient, from which numerous variations can be made. Soups with momo are common: both the Nepali jhol momo and the Tibetan mokthuk are examples.

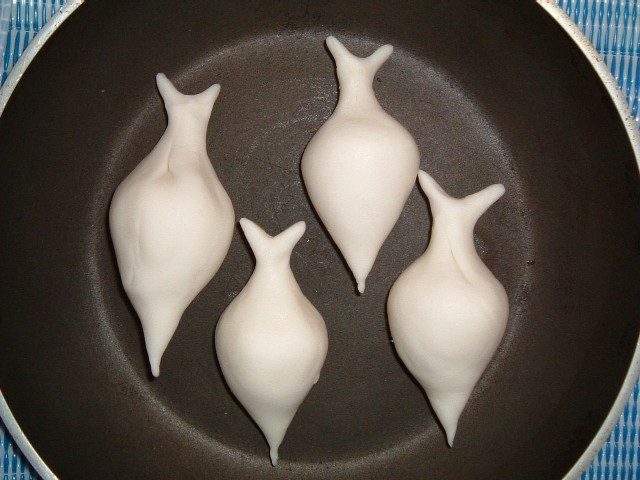
Yomari

Yomari, also called yamari, is a traditional dish of the Newar community in Nepal. It is a steamed dumpling that consists of an external covering of rice flour and an inner content of sweet substances such as chaku. The delicacy plays a very important role in Newaa society, and is a key part of the festival of Yomari punhi. According to some, the triangular shape of the yamari is a symbolic representation of one half of the shadkona, the symbol of Saraswati and wisdom.

== Southeast Asian ==
=== Indonesian ===
Indonesian cuisine features several dishes which could be characterized as dumplings, especially under the influence of Chinese and Portuguese cuisines.

- Jalangkote is a South Sulawesi fried pastry with an empanada shape and stuffed with vegetables, potatoes and eggs. Spicy, sweet and sour sauce will be dipped into prior to be eaten.
- Pastel is the most common empanada-shaped fried pastry to be found in Indonesia. The name was taken from Portuguese pastei. It is stuffed with ragout that is made from chicken, vegetables and eggs.
- Panada is a North Sulawesi type of fried bread similar to an empanada and stuffed with spicy tuna.
- Pangsit (wonton) is another type of dumpling that may be boiled, fried, or steamed, and often is used as complement of bakmi ayam or chicken noodle.
- Siomay is an Indonesian fish dumpling served in peanut sauce. In a different part of Indonesia such as in Surabaya, siomay can mean steamed pangsit and it will be served with bakso, meatballs soup.

== See also ==
- Czech cuisine
- Fusion cuisine
- List of dumplings
- Gulab jamun – a sweet, similar to a dumpling but made from milk solids
- Pie
- Ravioli
