= List of dumplings =

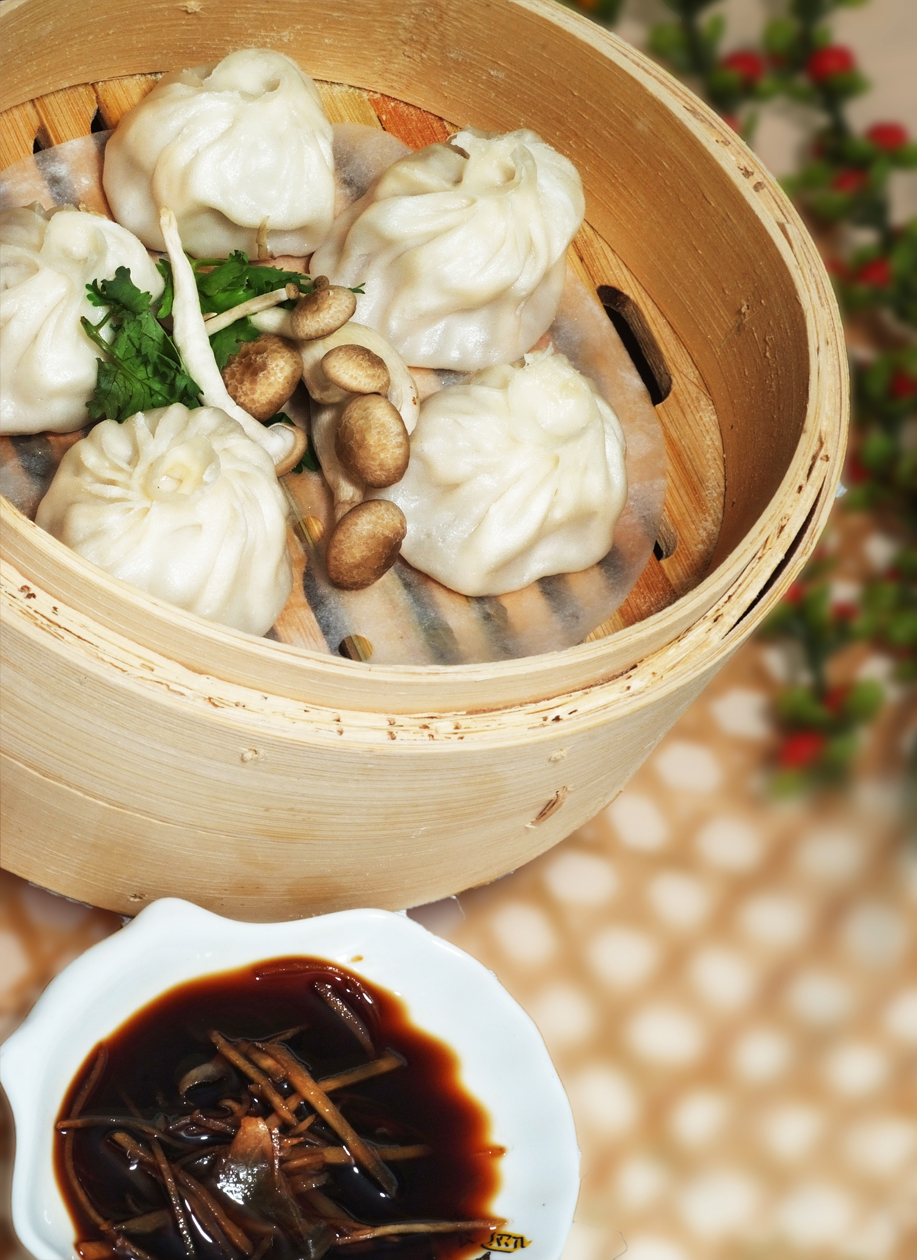
Dumplings in a basket, served with a dipping sauce

This is a list of notable dumplings. Dumpling is a broad class of dishes that consist of pieces of dough (made from a variety of starch sources) wrapped around a filling, or of dough with no filling. The dough can be based on bread, flour or potatoes, and may be filled with meat, fish, cheese, vegetables, fruits or sweets. Dumplings may be prepared using a variety of methods, including baking, boiling, frying, simmering or steaming and are found in many world cuisines. Some definitions rule out baking and frying to exclude items like fritters and other pastries that are generally not regarded as dumplings by most individuals.

== Dumplings ==
=== A ===
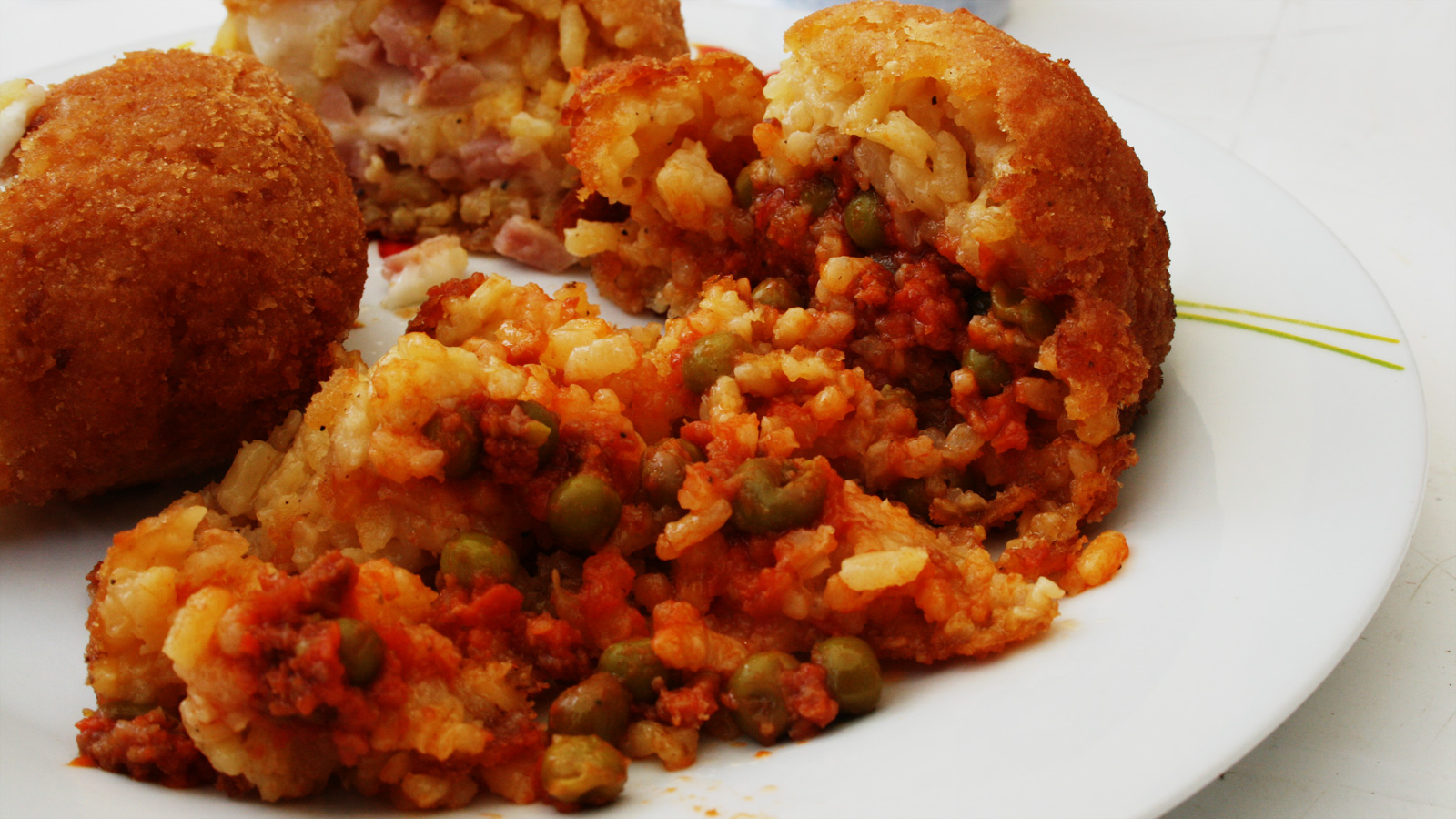
Arancini are Italian rice balls that are stuffed, coated with breadcrumbs and deep-fried.

- Abacus seeds – Hakka stir-fried taro dumplings
- Ada (food) – Regional traditional Indian sweet
- Agnolini – Stuffed pasta originally from the Italian region of Lombardy
- Agnolotti – Italian meat-filled pasta
- Akashiyaki – Japanese round dumpling with octopus filling
- Ang ku kueh – Chinese dumpling
- Apple dumpling – Pastry-wrapped apple
- Arancini – Italian snack food
- Aushak – Afghan dish made of pasta dumplings

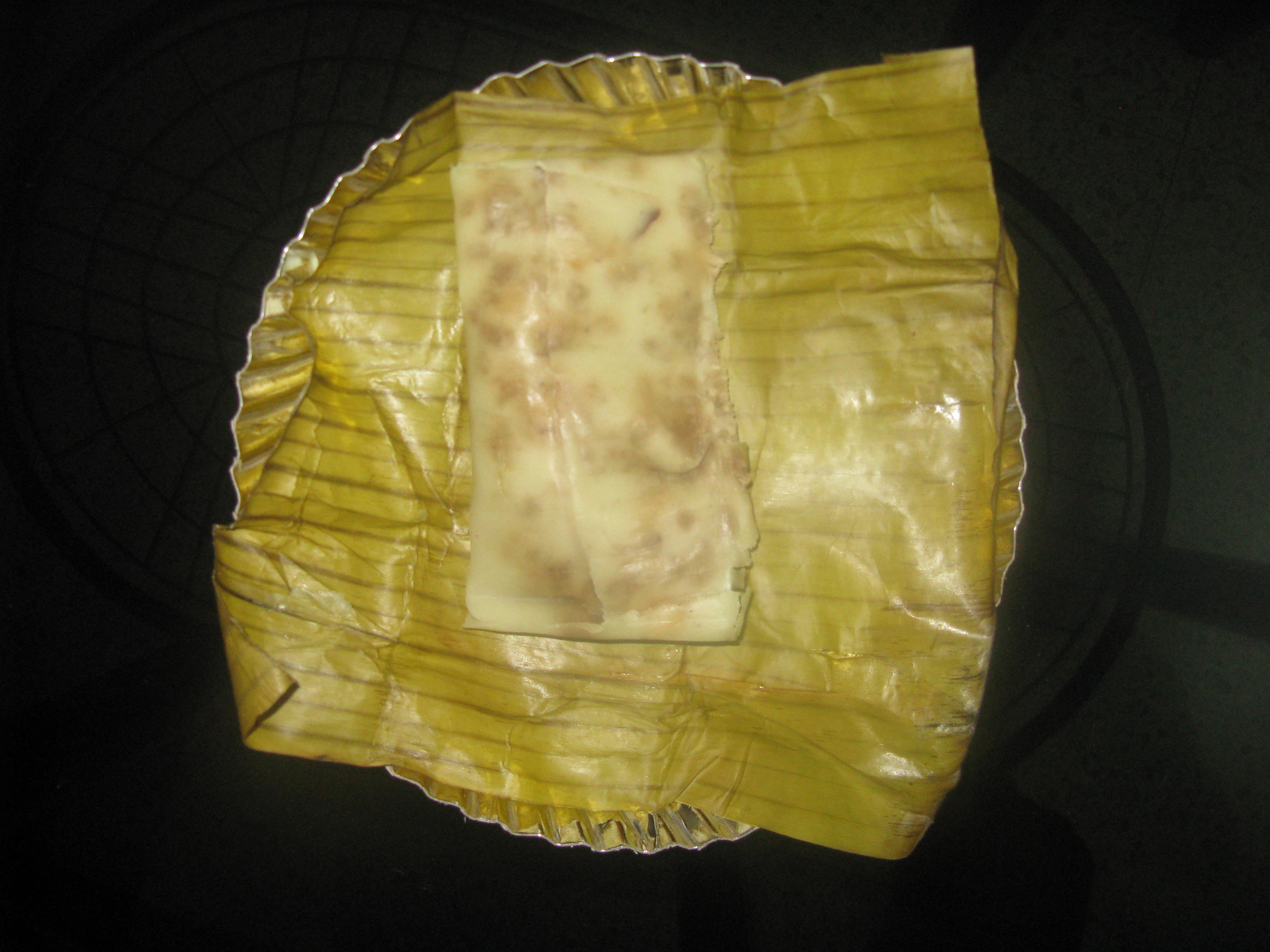
Ada is a traditional Kerala delicacy, consisting of rice parcels encased in a dough made of rice flour, with sweet fillings, steamed in banana leaf and served as an evening snack or as part of breakfast.

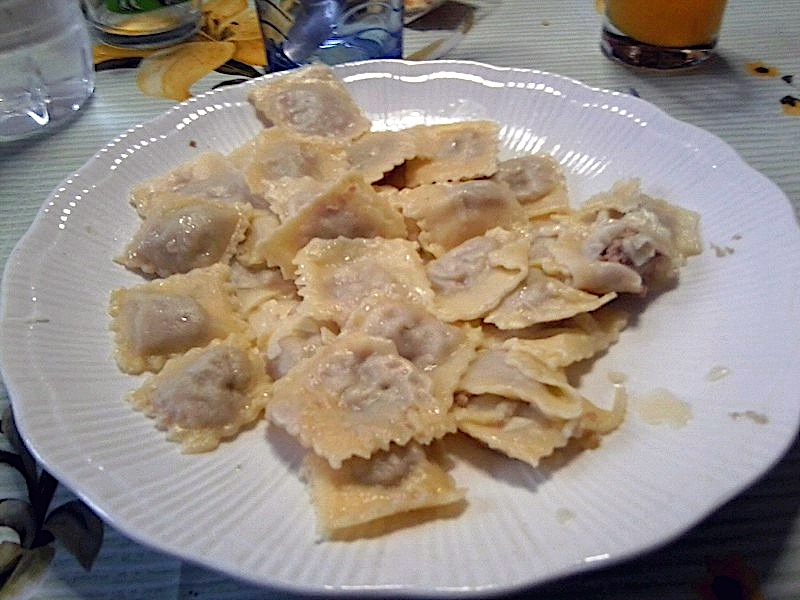
Agnolotti is a type of ravioli typical of the Piedmont region of Italy, made with small pieces of flattened pasta dough, folded over with a roast beef meat and vegetable stuffing.

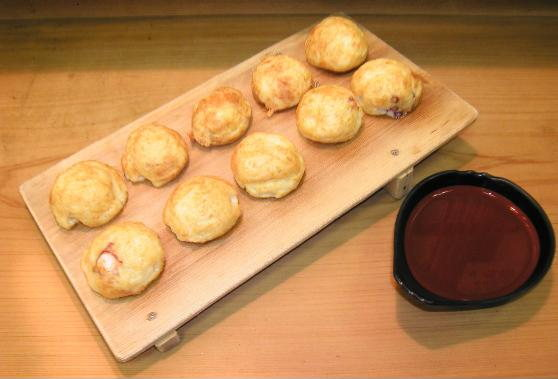
Akashiyaki is a small round dumpling from the city of Akashi in Hyōgo Prefecture, Japan. It's made of an egg-rich batter and octopus dipped into dashi (a thin fish broth) before eating.

=== B ===
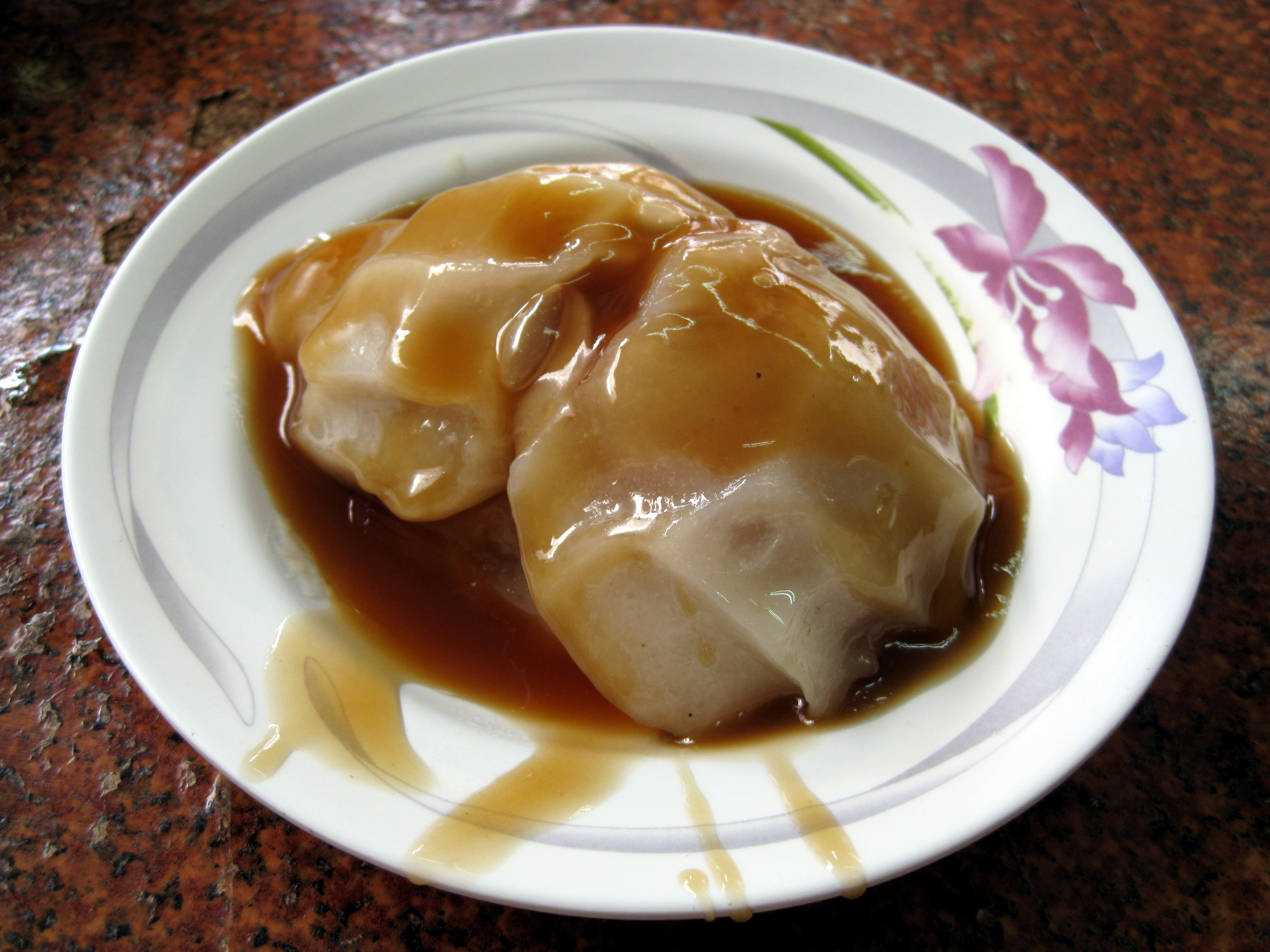
Ba-wan is a Taiwanese snack food.

- Ba-wan – Taiwanese street food
- Bánh bao – Chinese steamed bun
- Bánh chưng – Vietnamese rice cake
- Bánh lá – Stuffed leaf cake
- Bánh tẻ – Vietnamese steamed rice cakes
- Bánh tét – Vietnamese cake made from glutinous rice
- Baozi – Chinese filled bun
- Bagiya – Dumpling delicacy in India and Nepal - Nepalese steam rice flour dumpling
- Blodpalt – Northern Finnish dumplings made with flour and blood
- Boraki – Armenian cuisine
- Borș de burechiușe – Romanian and Moldovan dish
- Bhapa pitha, steamed rice dumpling stuffed with date molasses and coconut from Bangladesh
- Bouchon
- Bryndzové halušky – Traditional Slovak dish
- Buuz – Type of Mongolian steamed meat dumpling

=== C ===
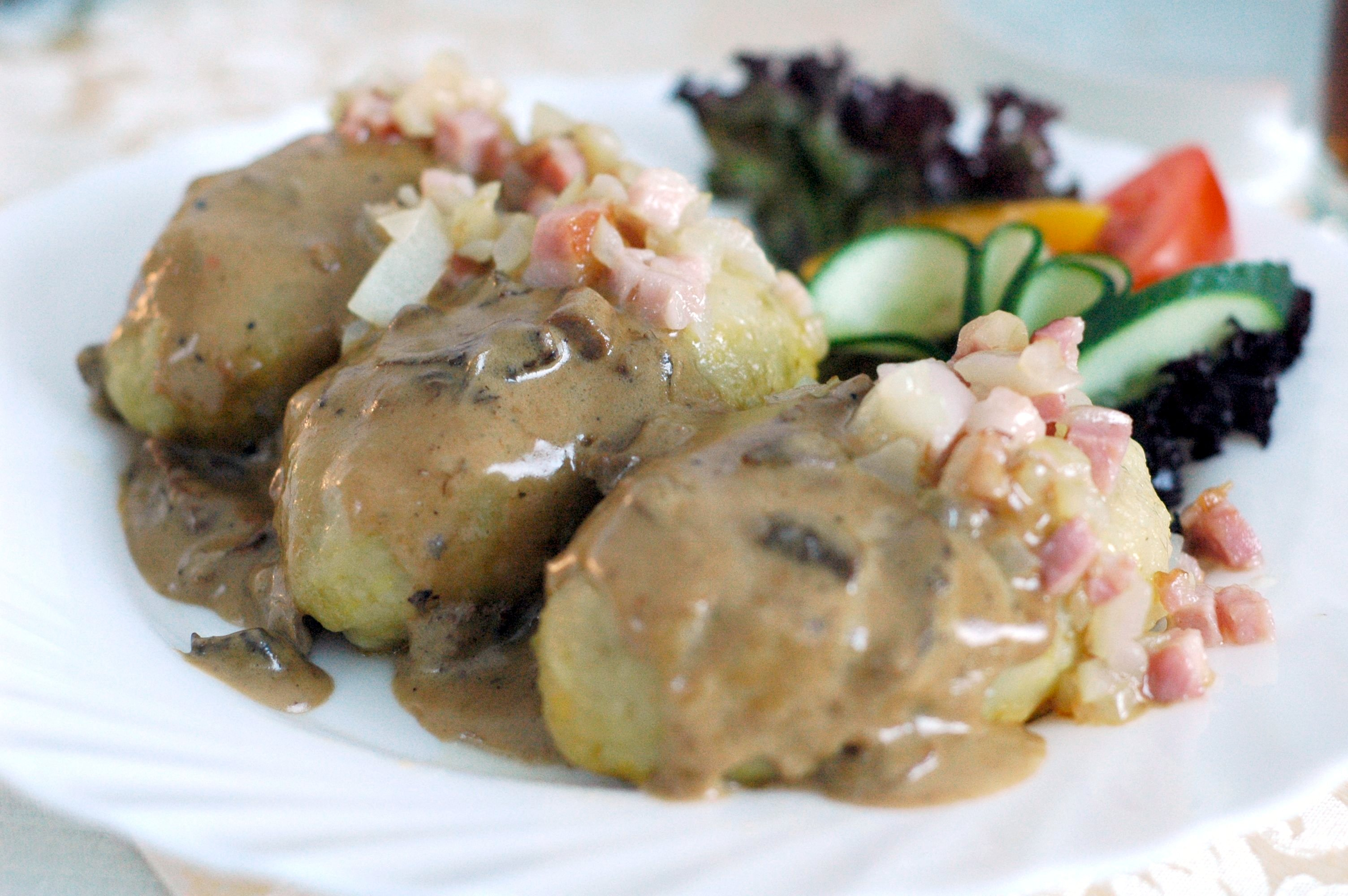
Cepelinai are a national dish of Lithuania.

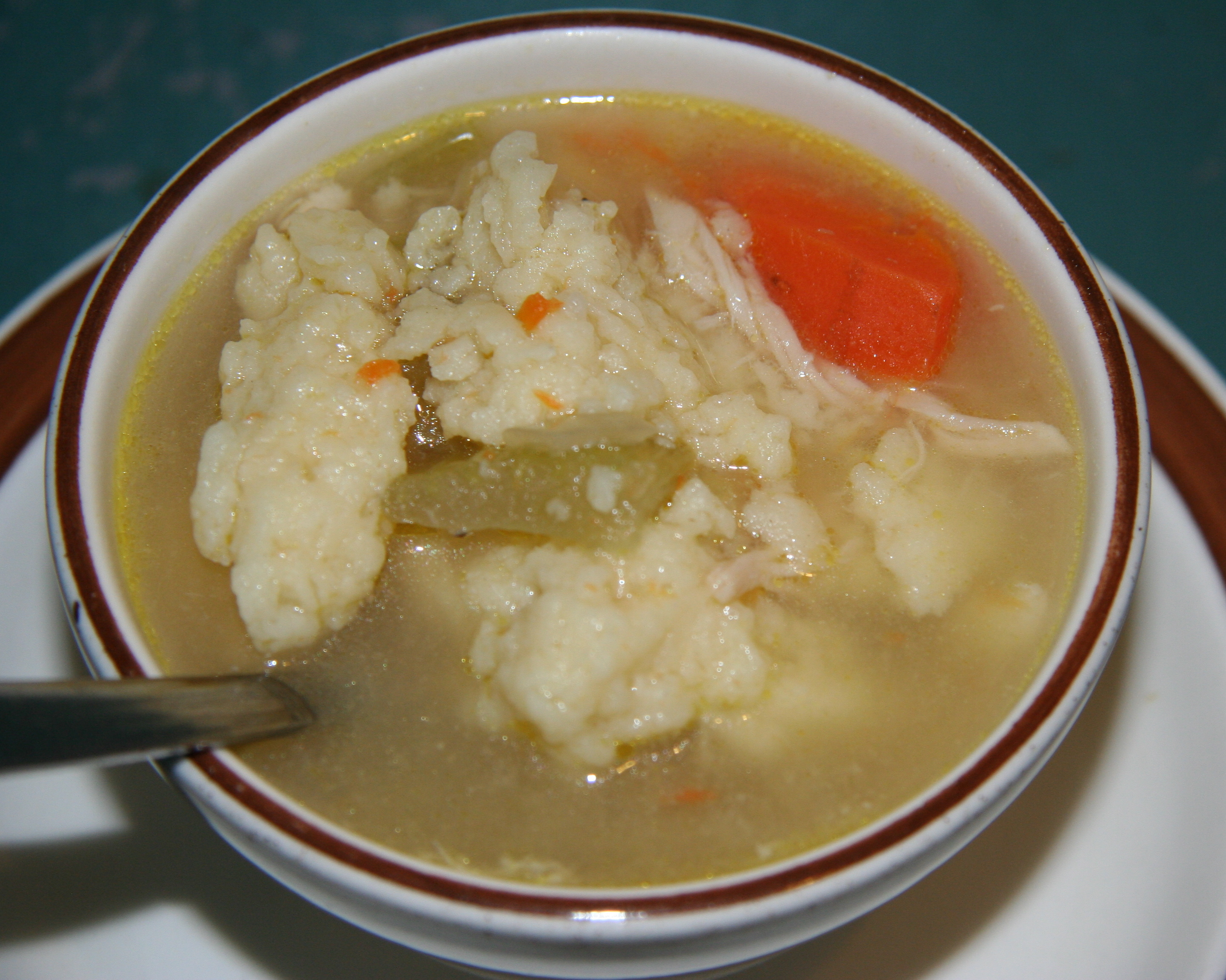
Chicken and dumplings, a Southern United States Country dish

- Caozai guo – Glutinous rice dumplings colored green with herbs
- Cappelletti – Ring-shaped pasta stuffed with filling
- Casunziei – Type of stuffed pasta
- Cepelinai – Lithuanian potato dish
- Chapalele – Chilean dumpling made from boiled potatoes and wheat flour
- Chiburekki – Crimean Tatar savoury pastry
- Chicken and dumplings – Chicken-based soup
- Chor muang – Thai snack dish
- Chuchvara – Central Asian dumpling dish
- Ci fan tuan – Chinese glutinous rice dish
- Cilok – Indonesian tapioca balls snack from West Java
- Cjarsons – Italian pasta dish
- Crab rangoon – American Chinese dumpling appetizers
- Culurgiones - Sardinian ravioli-like stuffed pasta

=== D ===
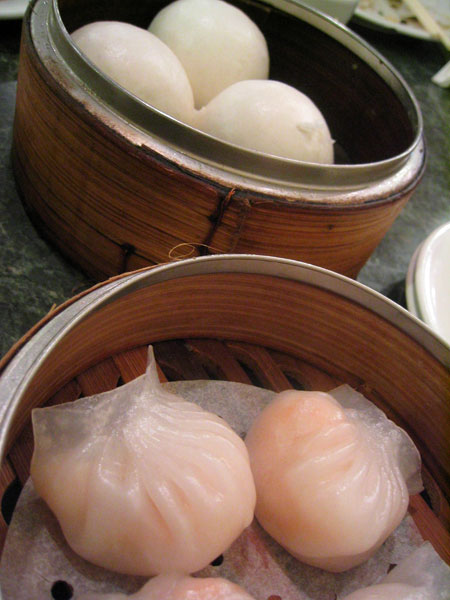
Dim sum dumplings

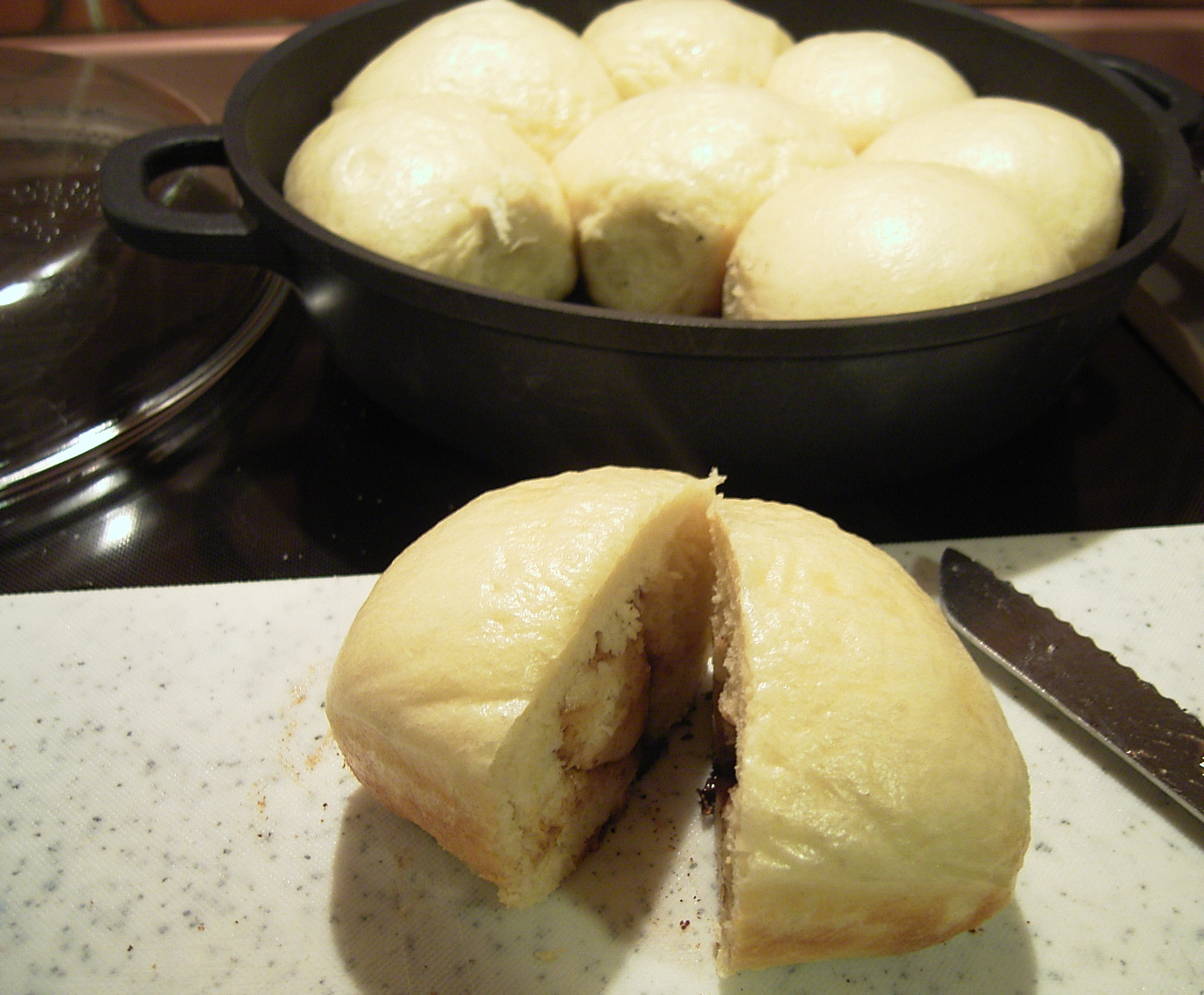
Dampfnudel

- Dampfnudel – German dumpling
- Dango – Japanese ricecake
- Dim sim – Chinese snack originating from Australia
- Ducana – Caribbean sweet potato dumpling
- Dushbara – Central Asian dumpling dish

=== E ===
- Empanada – Baked or fried turnover consisting of pastry and filling

=== F ===
- Fagottini – Type of pasta
- Fun guo – Chinese steamed dumplings

=== G ===
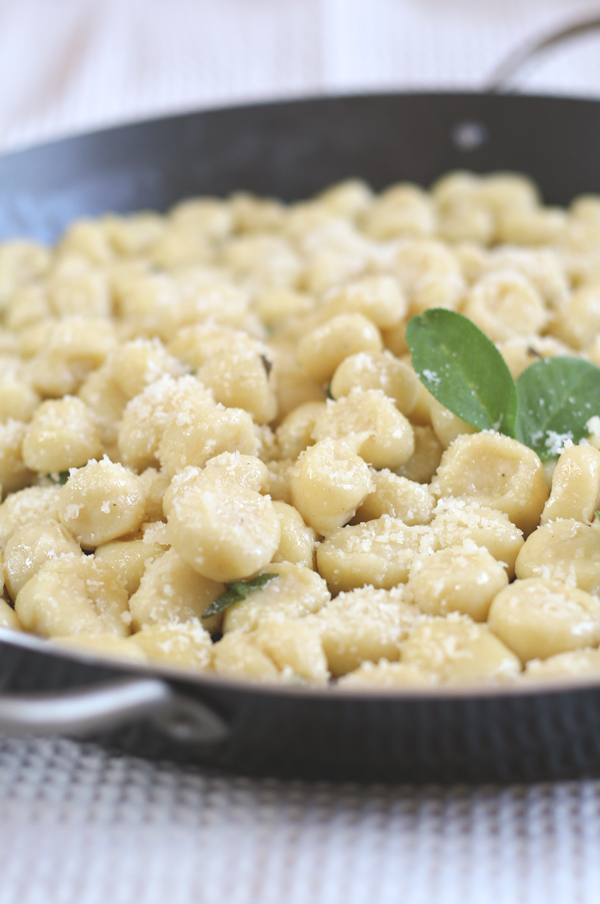
Gnocchi stuffed with ricotta cheese

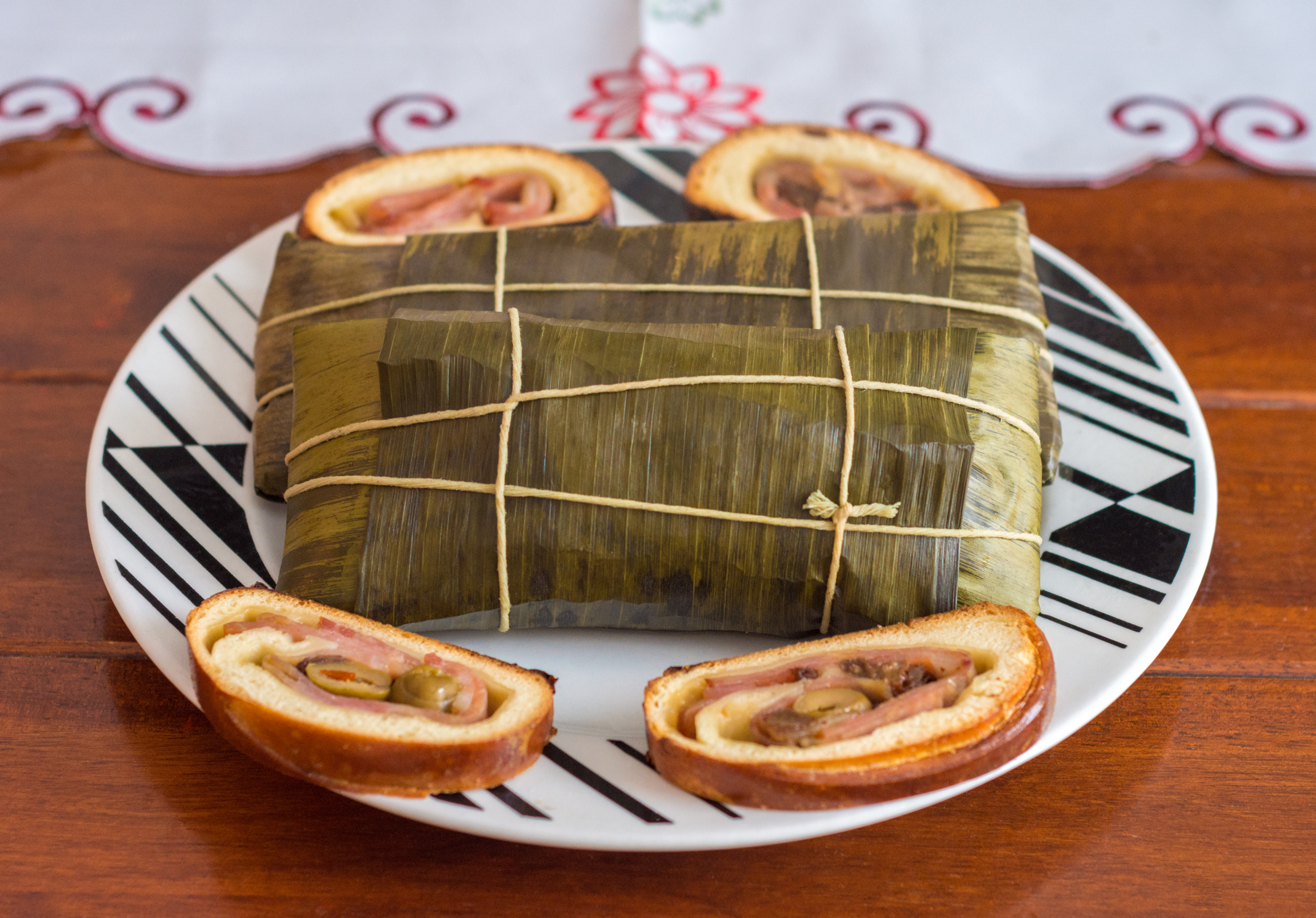
Hallaca with pan de jamón

- Germknödel – German and Austrian yeast dough dumpling
- Golden Syrup Dumplings
- Gnocchi – Small pasta-like dough dumplings
- Gnudi – Type of pasta
- Gondi dumpling – Persian Jewish dish
- Gong'a Momo – Nepalese and Tibetan dumpling
- Gujia – Indian sweet dish
- Gulha – Tuna and coconut dumplings
- Gürzə – Type of dumpling originating in Azerbaijan
- Gyoza – Chinese dumplings

=== H ===
- Hallaca – Dish from Venezuela
- Halušky – Eastern European dumpling or noodle dish
- Hanum – Rolled manti popular in Kyrgyzstan and Uzbekistan
- Har gow – Cantonese food
- Hujiao bing – Chinese baked bun
- Humita – Pre-Hispanic steamed corn dish in South America

=== I ===
- Idli – South Indian savoury rice cake
- Idrijski žlikrofi – Slovenian dumplings originating from Idrijski

=== J ===
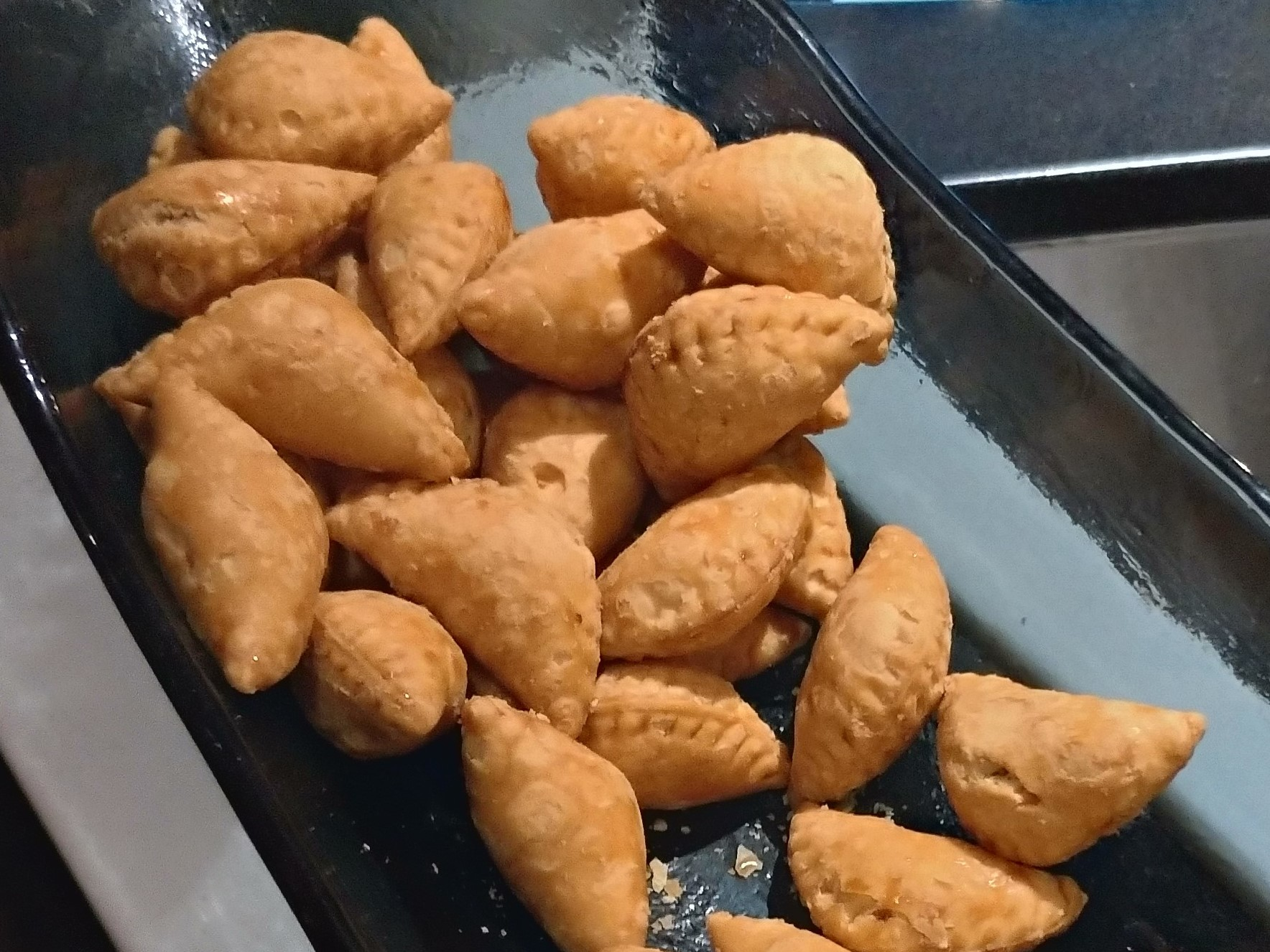
Jau gok

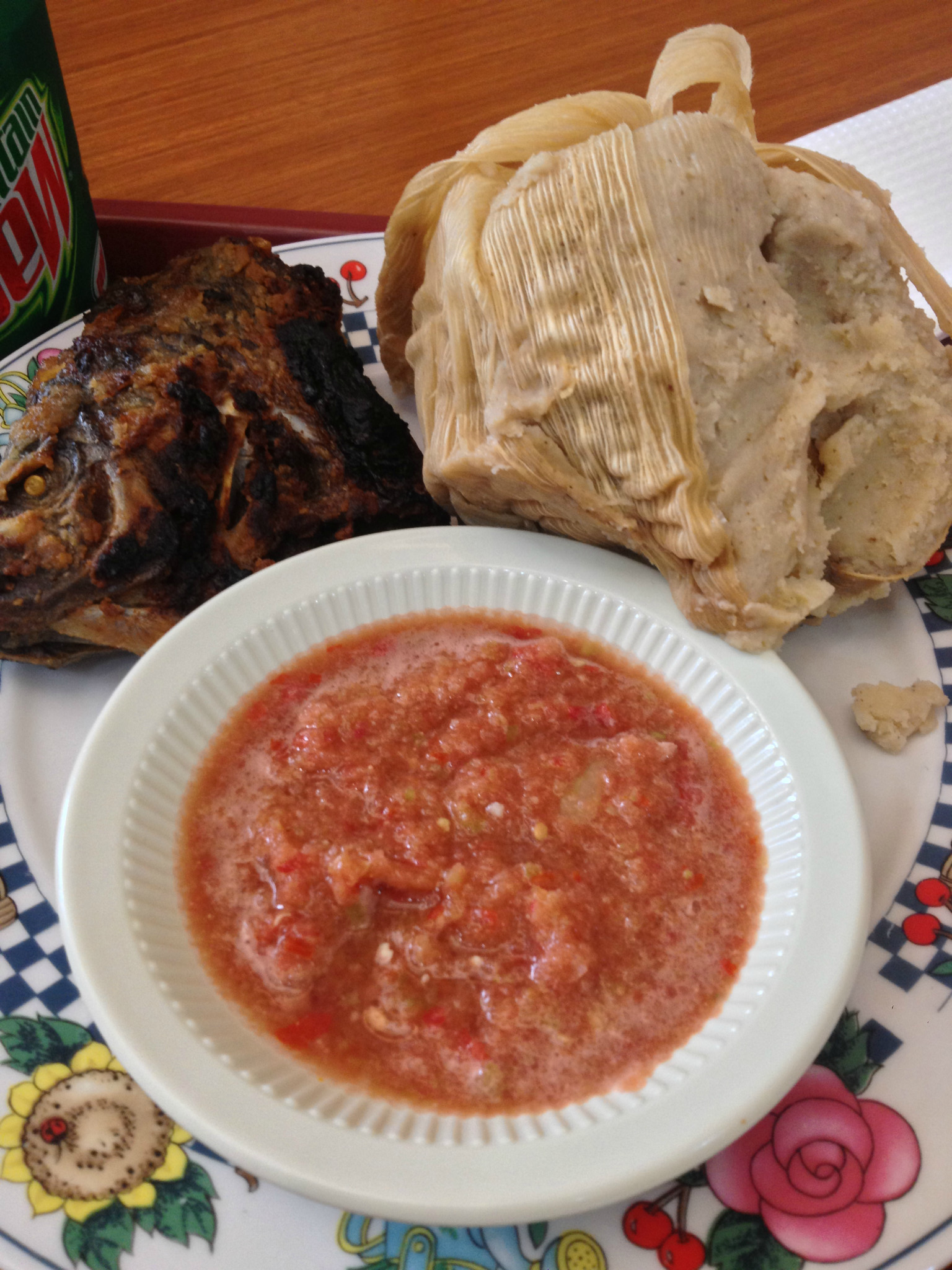
Kenkey (upper right) with fried fish and pepper

- Jahodový
- Jamaican patty – Type of pastry
- Jau gok – Cantonese-style pastry snack
- Jiaozi – Chinese dumplings
- Joshpara – Central Asian dumpling dish

=== K ===
- Kalduny – Type of dumplings in Balto-Slavic cuisines
- Kenkey – Ground maize dumpling from West Africa
- Khinkali – Georgian dumpling
- Khuushuur – Mongolian fried meat pastry or dumpling
- Kibbeh – Arab and Levantine dish of ground meat and bulgur
- Knödel – Large round poached or boiled potato or bread dumplings, made without yeast
- Kluski – Polish name for dumplings, noodles and pasta
- Klepon – Southeast Asian traditional rice cake
- Knedle – European dish of boiled dumplings
- Knepfle
- Knish – Ashkenazi Jewish and Eastern European baked or fried snack food
- Knödel – Large round poached or boiled potato or bread dumplings, made without yeast
- Knoephla – Dumpling often used in soup
- Kopytka – Potato dumpling in Polish, Belarusian, and Lithuanian cuisines
- Kozhukkattai – Dumpling made from rice flour
- Kreplach – Traditional Jewish dumplings
- Kroppkaka – Swedish potato dumpling
- Kueh tutu – Singaporean steamed rice flour sweet snack
- Kuih kochi – Malaysian & Indonesian traditional dessert
- Kundiumi – Russian baked porcini dumplings
- Kudmulu

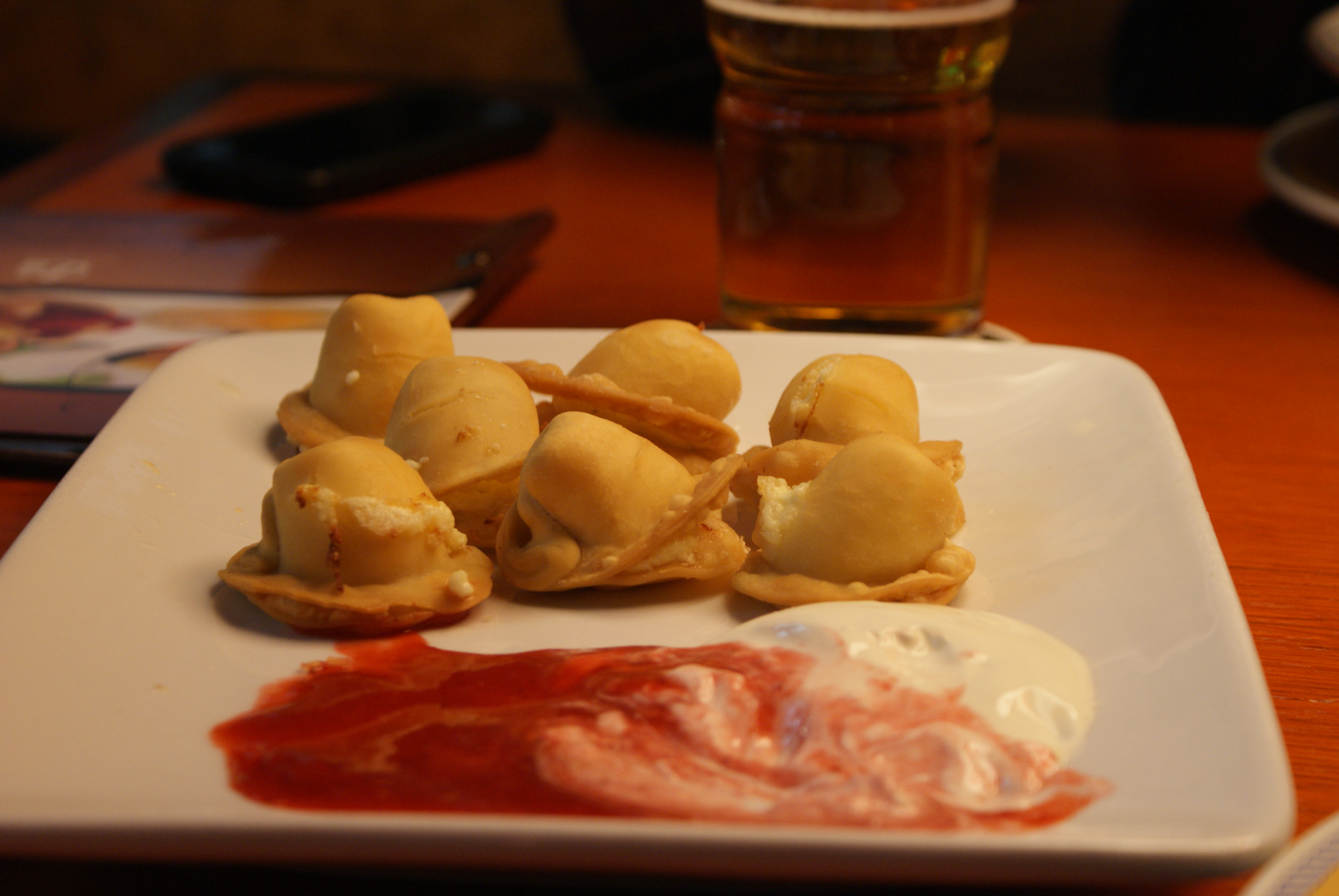
Kalduny are stuffed dumplings made of unleavened dough in Belarusian, Lithuanian, and Polish cuisines.

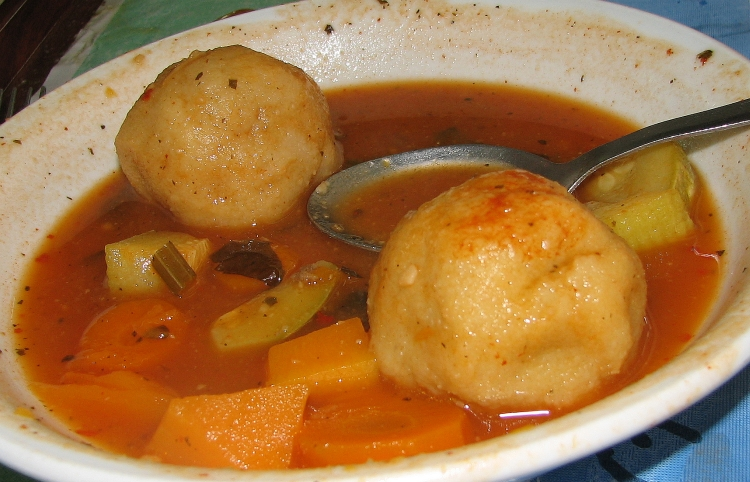
Iraqi-Jewish kibbeh. A well-known variety is a torpedo-shaped fried croquette stuffed with minced beef or lamb.

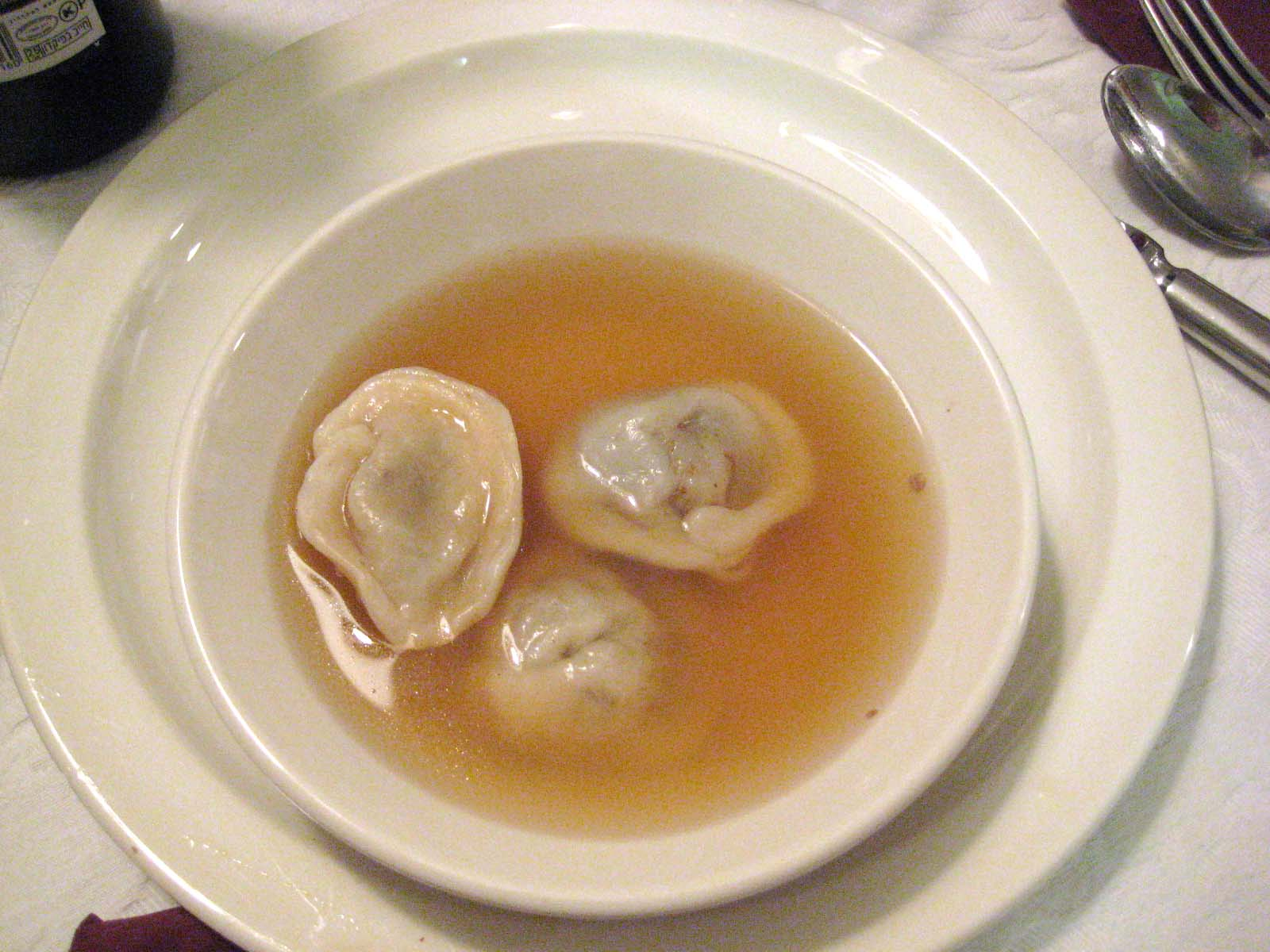
Meat-filled kreplach in a clear soup. Kreplach are filled with ground meat, mashed potatoes or another filling, usually boiled and served in chicken soup, though they may, rarely, be served fried.

=== L ===
- Leberknödel – Liver dumpling
- Lilva Kachori
- Lo mai gai – Cantonese leaf-wrapped dim sum
- Lukhmi – Type of samosa of Hyderabad, India

=== M ===
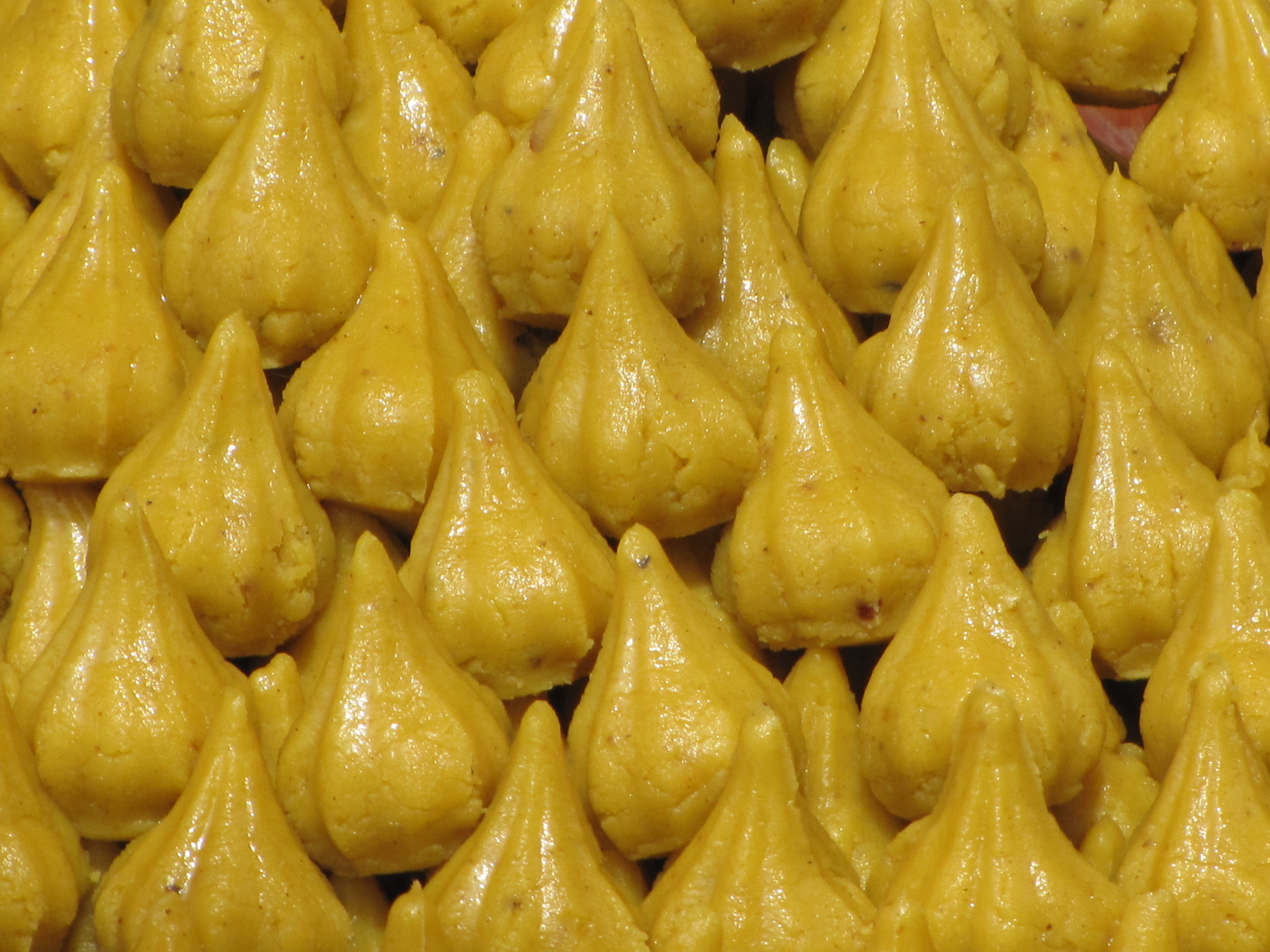
Modak is a sweet dumpling popular in Western and South India, Sri Lanka and Southeast Asia.

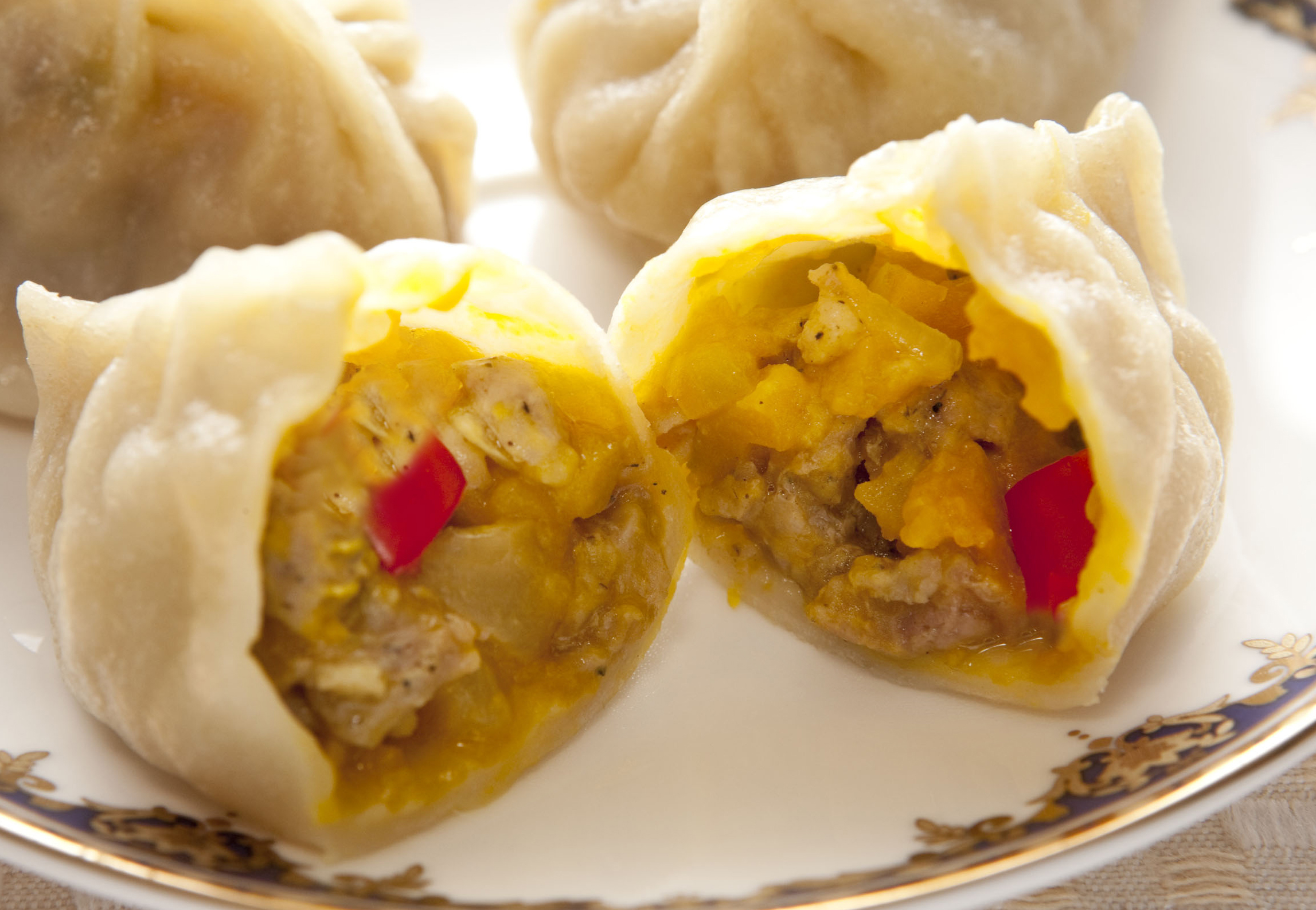
Manti, traditional dumplings of Turkic peoples are common throughout Central and Western Asia, from Xinjiang to Caucasus and Anatolia.

- Madombi – Botswanan dumplings
- Mandu – Korean dumplings
- Mandugwa – Korean sweet dumpling
- Manti – Type of dumpling popular in Central and West Asia as well as the Balkans
- Marillenknödel – Apricot dumplings from Central Europe
- Maroi bori thongba – Lentil dumpling and chive curry and soup from Manipur
- Matzah ball – Soup dumpling in Jewish cuisine
- Maultasche – Swabian meat-filled dumpling
- Mera Pitha – Rice dumpling pitha originating from Bangladesh
- Mitarashi dango – Skewered rice dumplings with sweet soy sauce
- Modak – South and Southeast Asian sweet dumpling dish
- Mohnnudel – Potato dish
- Momo – Nepalese and Tibetan dumpling
- Mont phet htok – Pyramid rice dumpling

=== N ===
- Nagasari – Indonesian steamed cake

=== O ===
- Orama – Central Asian steamed pie

=== P ===
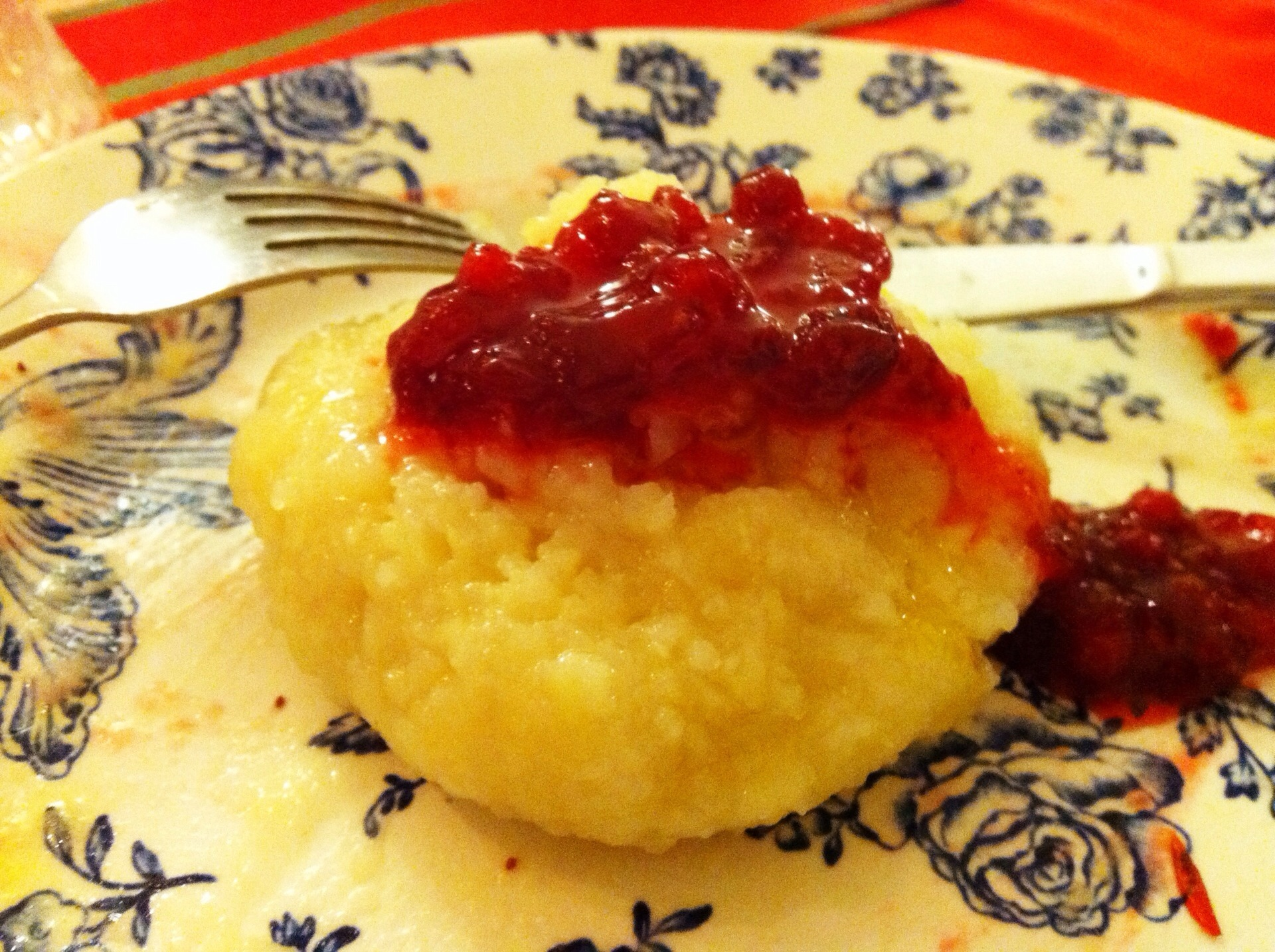
Palt is a traditional Swedish meat-filled dumpling, of which there are many different variants.

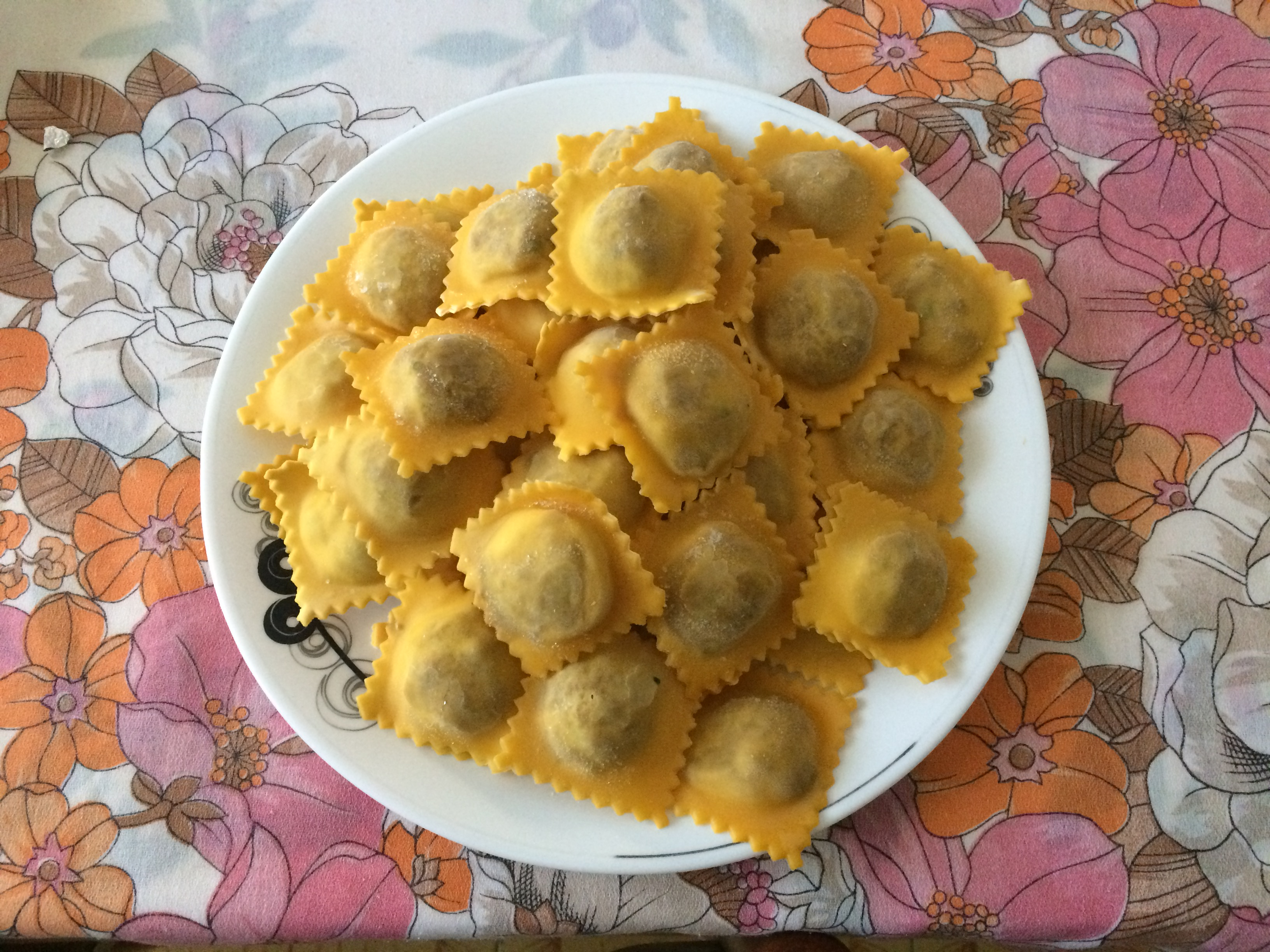
Pavese agnolotti, an Italian meat-filled pasta

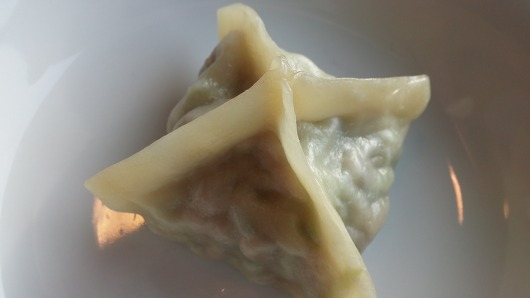
Pyeonsu, a type of Korean dumpling.

- Palt – Type of dumpling from Sweden
- Papanasi – Romanian and Moldovan traditional fried or boiled dessert
- Pamonha – Traditional Brazilian food
- Pancit Molo – Filipino pork dumpling soup
- Pantruca
- Pasteles – Caribbean and Latin American dish
- Pasty – Pastry filled with meat or vegetables
- Patoleo – Indian stuffed turmeric leaf wraps
- Pavese agnolotti – Italian meat-filled pasta
- Pelmeni – Russian dumplings
- Pempek – Indonesian dish made of fish and tapioca
- Pickert – Potato dish
- Pierogi – Stuffed Polish dumplings
- Pitepalt – Swedish dish
- Pitha – Food originating from Indian subcontinent
- Pizza rolls – Frozen pizza snack
- Plum dumplings – European dish of boiled dumplings
- Pot Stickers – Chinese dumplings
- Poutine râpée – Traditional Acadian dumpling dish
- Pupusas – Central American dish
- Pundi – Indian rice dumpling
- Pyeonsu – Korean dumpling

=== Q ===
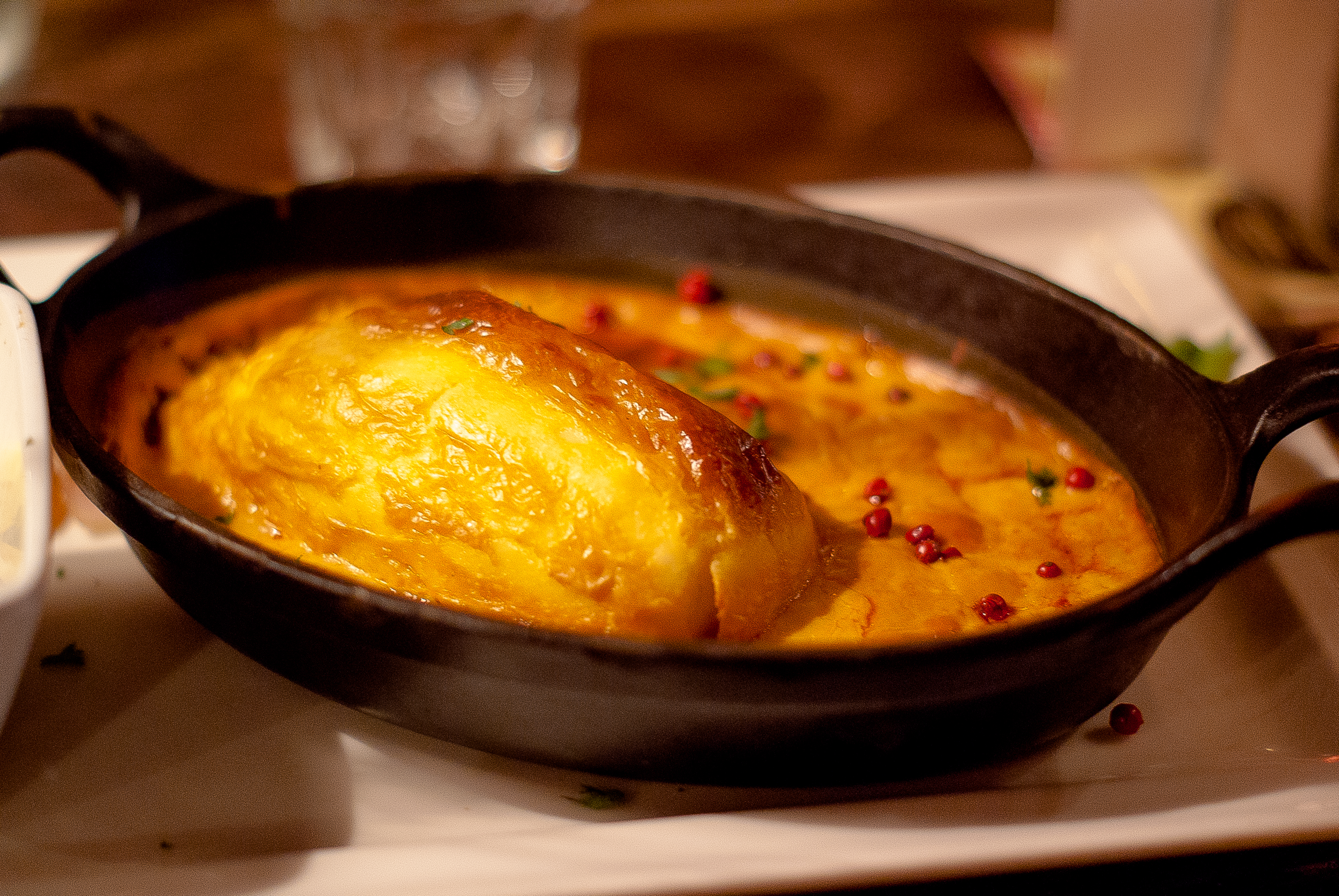
A Quenelle with nantua sauce

- Quenelle – Mixture of creamed fish or meat with a light egg binding, formed into an egg-like shape

=== R ===
- Raspeball – Potato dumpling
- Ravioli – Type of filled pasta
- Raviole du Dauphiné – French pasta dish
- Raviole du Trièves
- Rissole – European fried dish
- Rivels – Egg-based dumpling of Germanic origin

=== S ===
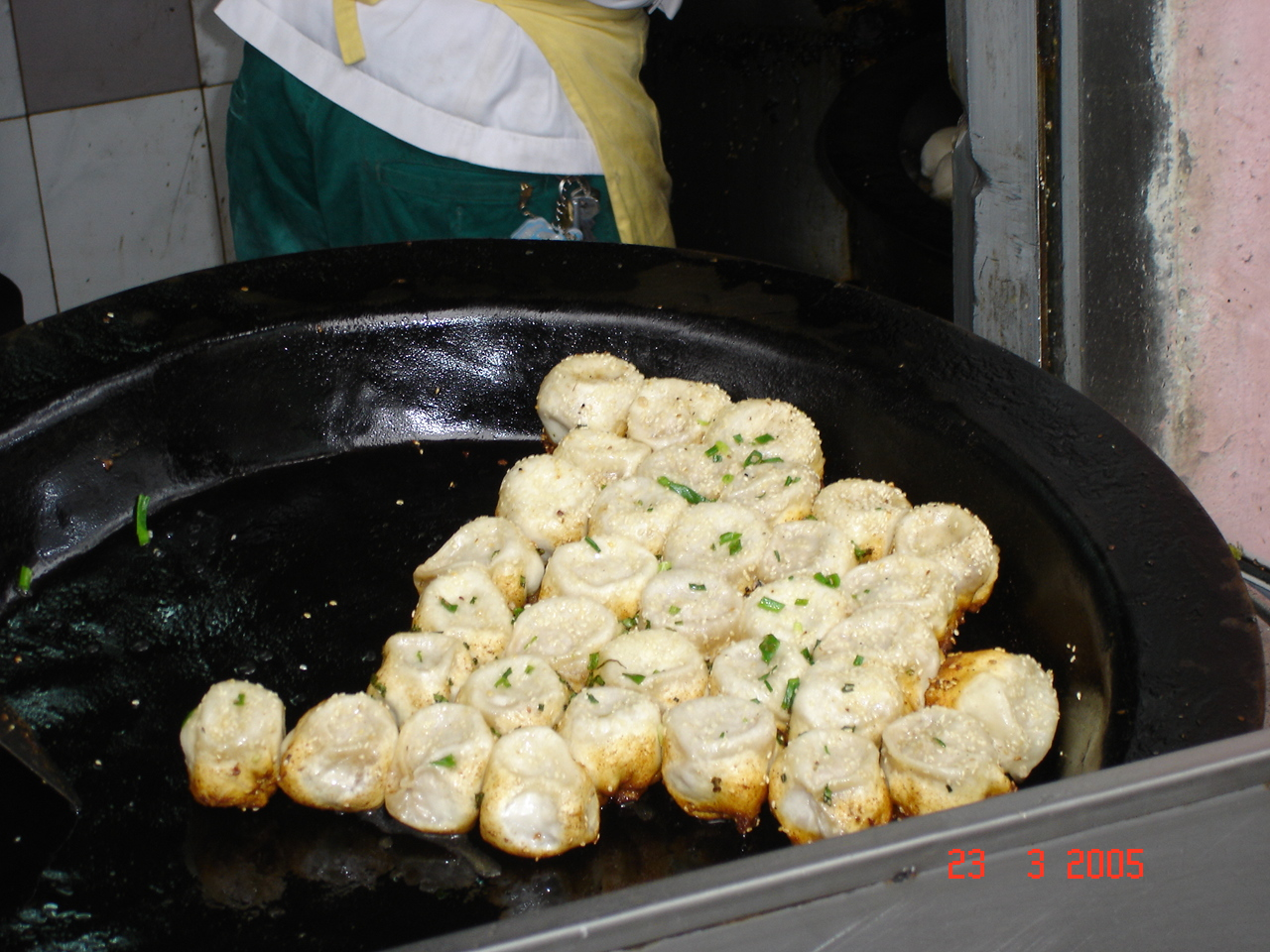
Shengjian mantou

- Sacchettoni – Type of pasta
- Sarmale – Stuffed dish
- Samosa – Deep-fried snack/ turnover
- Schlutzkrapfen – Type of stuffed pasta
- Schupfnudel – Central European dumpling
- Scovardă – Romanian pastry
- Shengjian mantou – Chinese pan-fried steamed bun dish
- Shishbarak – Central Asian dumpling dish
- Shlishkes – Hungarian Jewish dumplings
- Shumai – Type of traditional Chinese dumpling
- Siomay – Indonesian steamed fish dumpling
- Silesian dumplings – Traditional Silesian potato dumplings
- Siopao – Philippine steamed bun
- Songpyeon – Traditional Korean rice cakes with a sweet filling
- Soon kueh – Teochew steamed dumpling
- Sorrentinos – Pasta stuffed with filling
- Spoja lorda – Type of square filled egg pasta
- Strapačky – Dish of dumplings with sauerkraut or cheese
- Suanla chaoshou – Spicy sauce over steamed, meat-filled dumplings
- Šúľance – Slovak potato gnocchi
- Szilvásgombóc – European dish of boiled dumplings

=== T ===
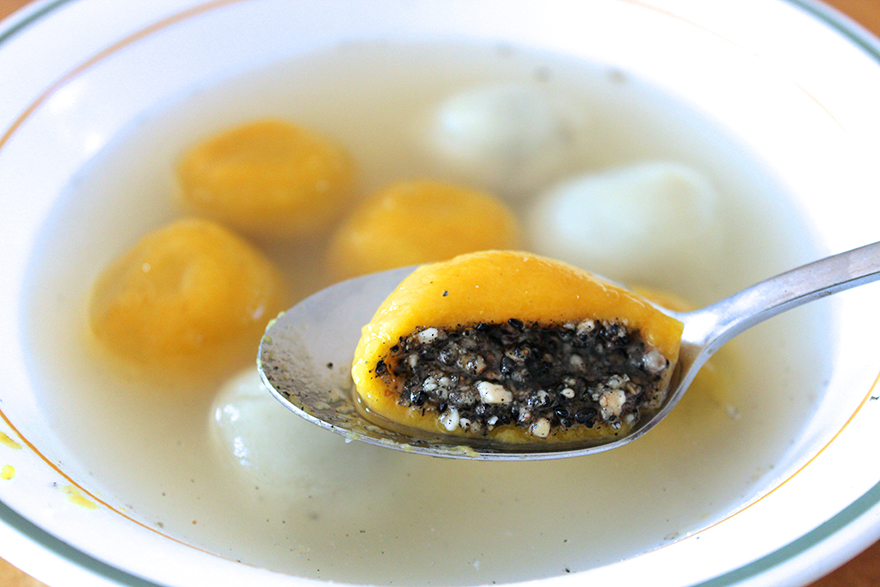
Tangyuan is a Chinese food made from glutinous rice flour. Stuffed and unstuffed varieties exist.

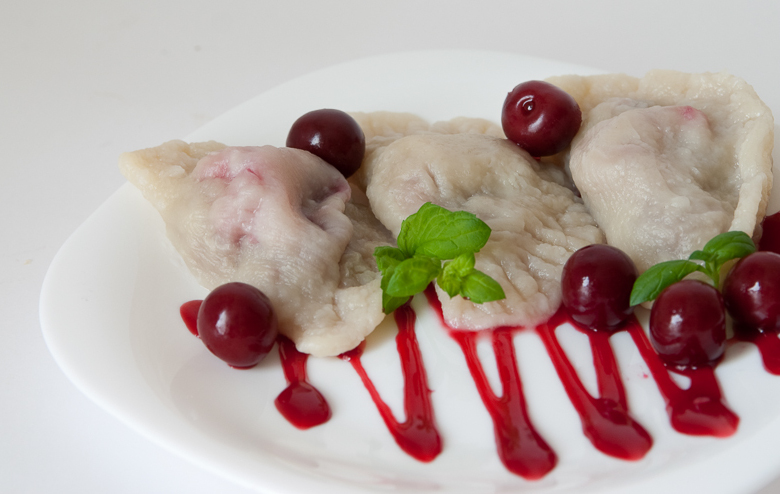
Ukrainian varenyky filled with sour cherries as a dessert

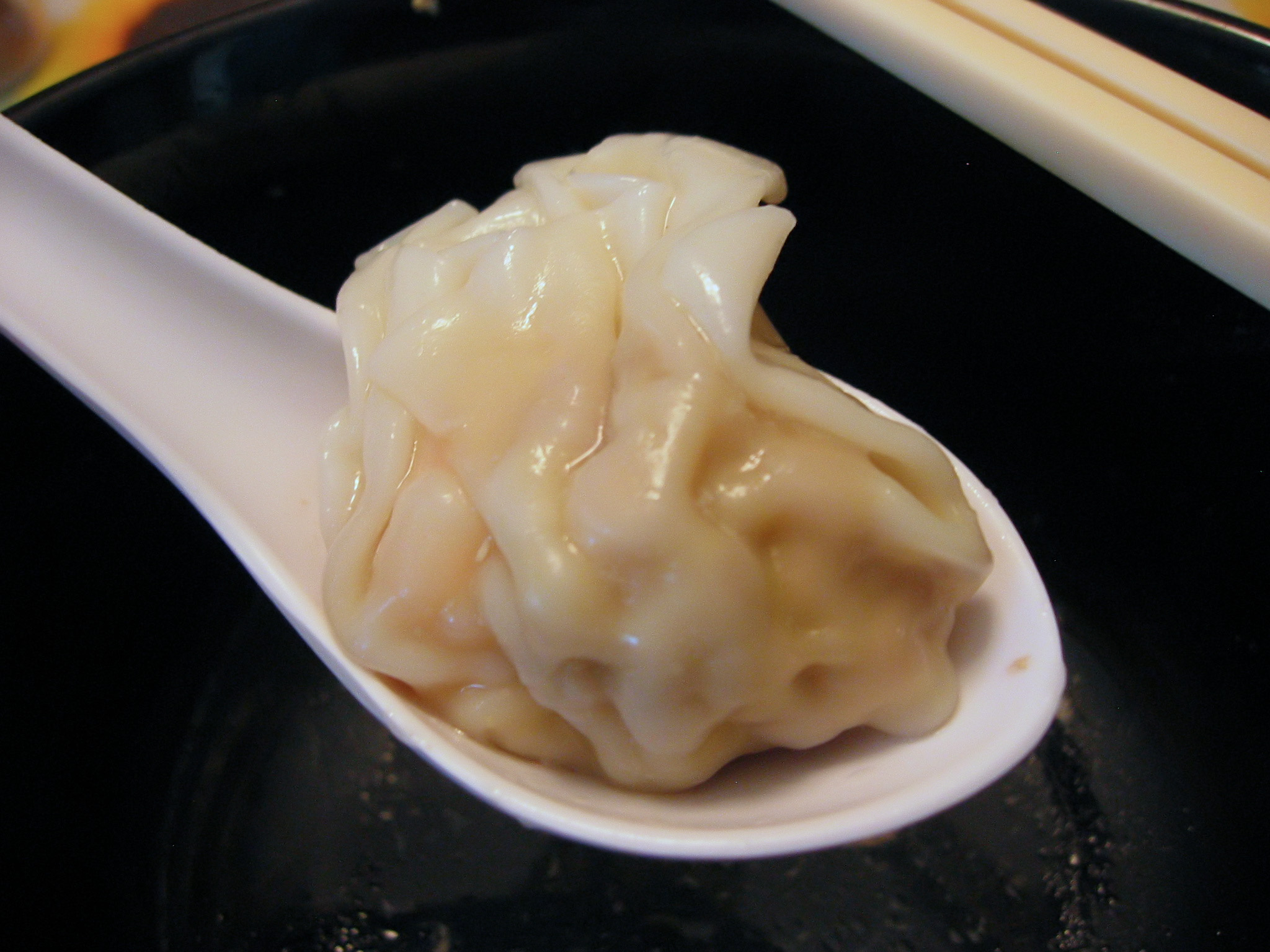
A Cantonese-style shrimp wonton

- Takoyaki – Japanese appetizer
- Tamale – Traditional Mesoamerican dish
- Tamalito – Traditional Mesoamerican dish
- Tang bao – Large soup-filled variety of steamed buns
- Tangyuan – Traditional Chinese dessert
- Taro dumpling – Chinese cuisine
- Tortelli – Stuffed pasta
- Tortellini – Stuffed egg pasta
- Tortello amaro di Castel Goffredo – Type of pasta
- Tortelloni – Stuffed egg pasta

=== U ===
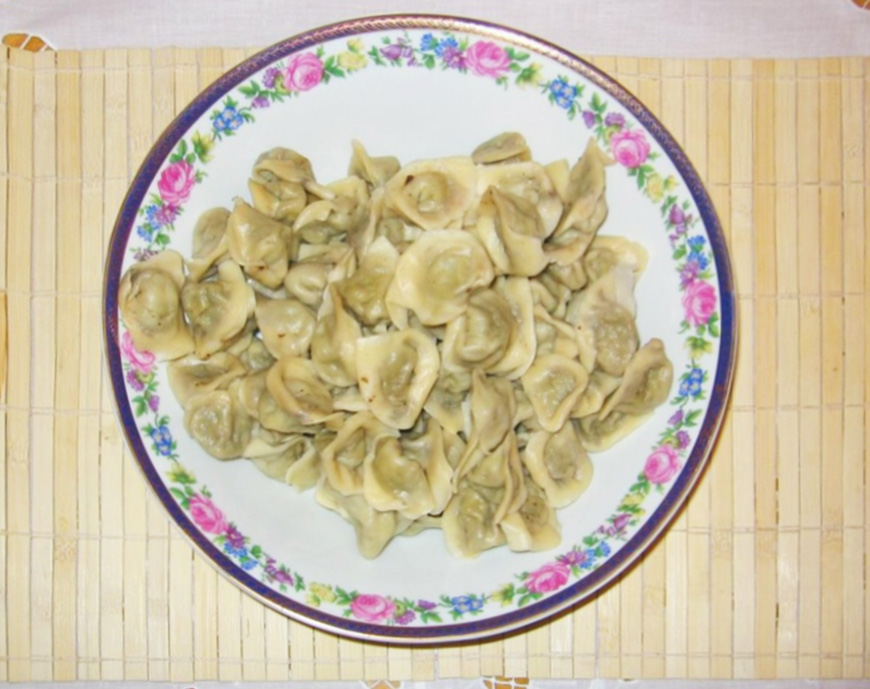
Uszka

- Uncrustables – American sandwich brand
- Uszka – Small dumplings traditional in Poland and Ukraine

=== V ===
- Varenyky (sometimes Varenyki or Vareniki) – Unleavened stuffed pasta of Ukrainian origin, similar to pierogi

=== W ===
- Wonton – Type of Chinese dumpling

=== X ===
- Xiaolongbao – Type of Chinese steamed bun

=== Y ===
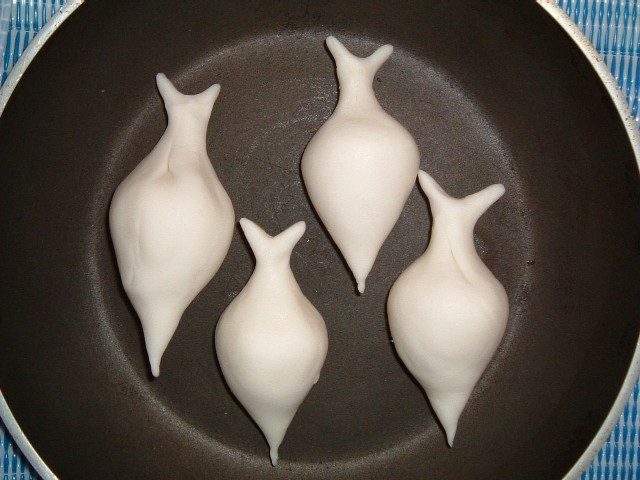
Yomari is made of rice flour dough and is filled with molasses and sesame seeds.

- Yanpi – Type of Chinese wonton skin
- Yau gok – Cantonese-style pastry snack
- Yen Wan
- Yomari – Nepali sweet dumpling

=== Z ===
- Zhaliang – Cantonese dish
- Zillertaler Krapfen
- Zongzi – Traditional Chinese food

== See also ==
- List of rolled foods
- List of sandwiches
- List of pasta
