= Rice dumpling =

Rice dumpling may refer to:

- Zongzi
- Lo mai gai
- Jan ju gai
- Tangyuan
- Lo mai chi
- Lepet
- Pundi
- Ketupat
