= Pang Kok Keong =

Singaporean chef

- Born: 1975 (age 50–51)
- Education: Diploma in Food Preparation
- Alma mater: Rulang Primary School, Yuhua Secondary School, Singapore Hotel and Tourism Education Centre (SHATEC)
- Occupations: Pastry Chef, Chef, Entrepreneur
- Known for: Canelé by Les Amis (defunct), Antoinette, Pang's Hakka Delights
- Spouse: Vickie Ong (m. 2006)

Pang Kok Keong (born 1975) is a chef in Singapore. He was the chef-owner of Antoinette (closed down circa 2020), a home-grown Parisian-style pâtisserie, restaurant and salon du thé (French for the tea house) that features French cuisine and pastries. The dishes offered are made from a combination of traditional French techniques and modern cooking methods. He is also the owner of "Sugar Daddy Group" while Antoinette was running. He now runs his new venture SuperCurry and has a store front for Hakka noodles.

== Early life and education ==
Pang's parents are fishball noodles hawkers who owned a stall in Jurong. He grew up helping his mother in the kitchen. As a teenager, Pang worked part-time jobs in coffee shops and restaurants to earn pocket money.

Pang studied in Rulang Primary School and Yuhua Secondary School. He enrolled in the Singapore Hotel and Tourism Education Centre (SHATEC) at 16 years old and graduated with a diploma in food preparation in 1996.

== Career ==
Pang started pastry-making during a work attachment at the Imperial Hotel, where he was assigned to the pastry section due to a lack of manpower.

Pang was the Executive Pastry Chef at Les Amis Group’s first pastry shop, Canelé Pâtisserie, in 2004.

He set up Pang's Hakka Delights in 2018 as a way to revisit his Hakka roots. Pang cited leek kueh as a childhood dish made by his mother, who learned the recipe from her grandmother. When learning to make the dish, Pang mentioned that he had to learn it from memory, tasting the dish as he goes. Pang wanted to safeguard the legacy of Hakka dishes through this business venture as he found that these recipes were rarely documented. The restaurant served also served documenting Hakka cuisine for the younger generation.

With Pang's Hakka Delights, Pang tested various Hakka recipes like salt-baked chicken, yellow ginger poached chicken, and mei cai kou rou (pork belly with preserved mustard greens).

In 2018, Pang started selling abacus seeds, a Hakka dish commonly consumed during Chinese New Year.

Pang shared that it was initially difficult to convince his colleagues to accept his passion for making Hakka food, as it was a labour-intensive process.

== Awards & accolades ==
Pang has been participating in pastry competitions since 1996. These competitions were an outlet for his creativity. In 2011, Pang was inducted into the Pastry Chef Hall of Fame and is the youngest to receive such an honour.

Year	Event	Award	Notes	Refs.
2007	World Gourmet Summit 2007	Cacao Barry Pastry Chef of the Year	Finalist	
2011	World Pastry Cup	Singapore National Pastry Team (Team Manager, Coach)	Singapore ranked 7th out of 22 competitors	
2013	World Pastry Cup	Singapore National Pastry Team (Team Manager, Coach)	Singapore ranked 6th out of 22 competitors	
2018	Shatec Industry Excellence (SHINE) Awards	Outstanding Alumni Award (Pastry)		
