= Oromo =

Oromo may refer to:

- Oromo people, an ethnic group of Ethiopia and Kenya
- Oromo language, an Afroasiatic language

== See also ==
- Orma (clan), Oromo tribe
- Oromia, region
- Orama (dish), Central Asian food
