= Pyeonsu =

Korean dumpling

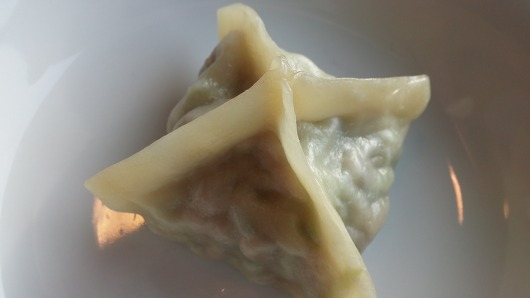
- Type: Mandu
- Place of origin: Korea
- Region or state: Gaeseong
- Associated cuisine: Korean cuisine
- Serving temperature: Chilled

Korean name
- Hangul: 편수
- RR: pyeonsu
- MR: p'yŏnsu
- IPA: [pʰjʌn.su]

Pyeonsu (Korean: 편수) is a square-shaped mandu (dumpling) in Korean cuisine. It is a food typically served in summer, served chilled, and dipped in soy sauce and vinegar. The city of Gaeseong is famous for its pyeonsu.

== Etymology ==
The origin of the word pyeonsu (편수) is obscure. Some claim that it was derived from byeonsi (변시), which appears in the 1527 book Collection of Characters for Training the Unenlightened as a borrowing from the Old Mandarin Chinese biǎnshí (匾食, lit. 'convenient food') that meant "dumplings" at the time. In Korean royal court cuisine during the Joseon era (1392–1897), wheat-skin dumplings boiled in water were called byeongsi (Korean: 병시; Hanja: 餠匙), with the letters byeong (병; 餠; meaning any flour dough food) and si (시; 匙; meaning "spoon") which, combined, could refer to dumplings that are eaten with a spoon. It is also said that the name is Sino-Korean pyeonsu (편수; 片水; lit. 'piece in water'), as the dumplings are served floating on water. Another claim is that the word was derived from Byeon-ssi mandu (변씨만두; 邉氏饅頭), which means "Byeon's dumplings", because it was first made by a person whose family name was Byeon (변; 邉).

== History ==
Although Korean mandu are believed to have first been brought to Korea by Yuan Mongolians in the 14th century during the Goryeo, the variety pyeonsu is thought to be derived from Ming Chinese dumplings brought into the Korean peninsula by the Joseon merchants based in Gaeseong.

During the Joseon era (1392–1897), wheat flour was a rare and expensive ingredient in most regions, except in Hwanghae Province, where wheat was very common. Many dumpling varieties in that period were made with buckwheat-flour, while in Gaeseong, where the wheat was abundant, dumpling skins were made with wheat flour. Wheat dumplings, called pyeonsu, were made with simple tofu and mung bean sprout stuffings in poorer households, while extravagant versions with beef and fresh oyster were made in wealthier households in Gaeseong. The 1809 compendium Women's Encyclopedia records that pyeonsu of Songdo (name of Gaeseong at the time) is famous and is made during the festivities around Korean New Year.

Unlike other dumpling varieties, pyeonsu was not popularized on a nationwide scale during the 20th century and remains a regional specialty usually served only in Gaeseong-style restaurants.

== Preparation ==
Wheat flour dough is made by mixing wheat flour with boiling water. The dough is then rolled thin and cut into squares to make pyeonsu. Common fillings include meat and vegetables such as beef, pork, chicken and pheasant meat, tofu, mung bean sprouts, mushrooms, oyster, and a couple of whole pine nuts per dumpling. The stuffings are seasoned with salt and black pepper, ground toasted sesame, sesame oil, and minced aromatic vegetables such as scallions, ginger, and garlic.

The dumplings are boiled in a beef-and-soy sauce-based broth, chilled, and served as is or in cold chicken broth. Soy sauce mixed with vinegar is usually served as dipping sauce.

Sometimes, pyeonsu can be served as warm pyeonsu-guk (dumpling soup), with gomyeong (garnish) such as egg garnish and chopped scallions on top.

== See also ==
- Pyanse
- List of dumplings
