= Agnolini =

Stuffed pasta originally from the Italian region of Lombardy

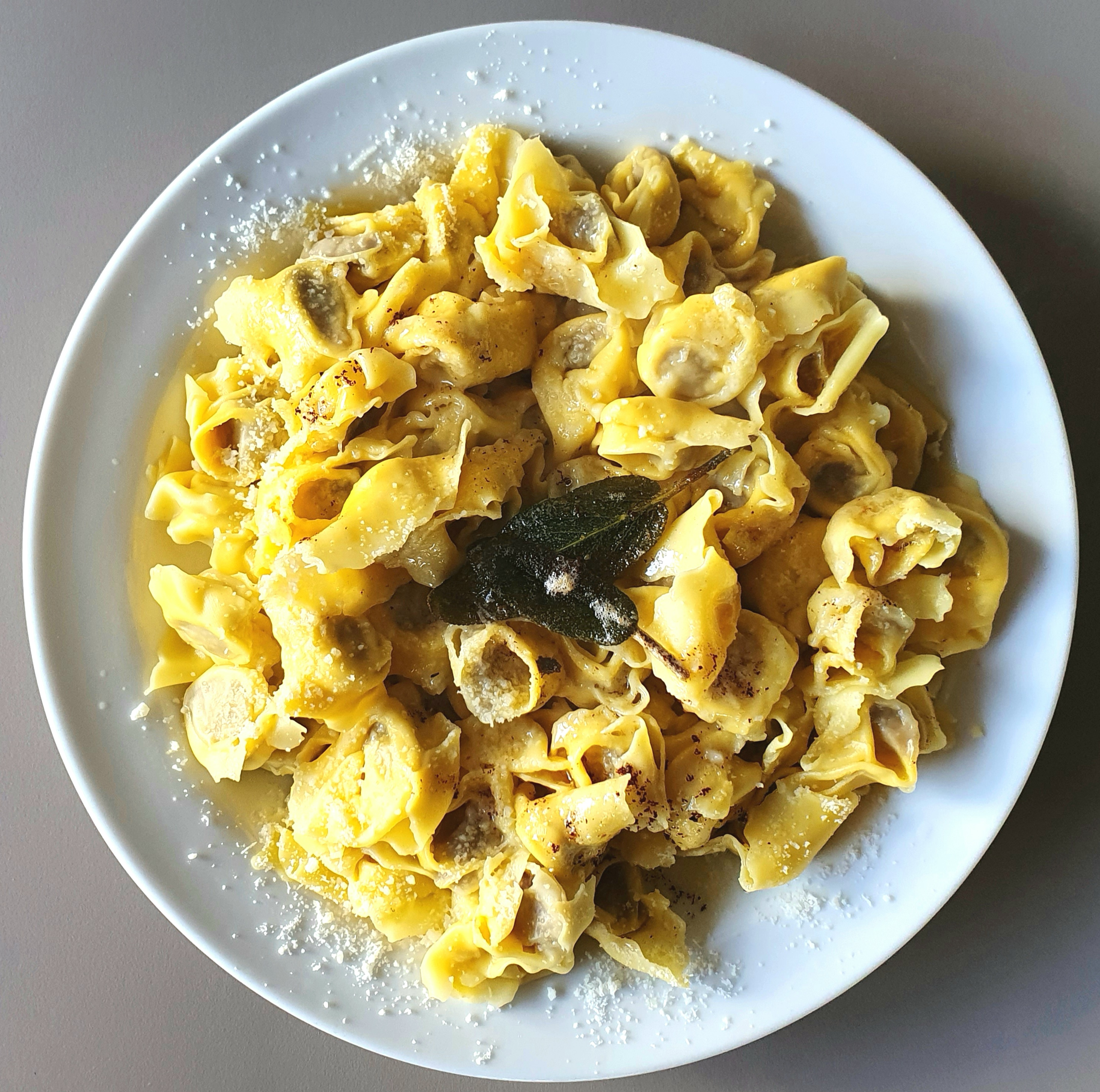
- Alternative names: Agnulìn, agnulì
- Course: Pasta
- Place of origin: Italy
- Region or state: Province of Mantua, Lombardy
- Serving temperature: Warm
- Main ingredients: Stracotto with white wine, salamella, pancetta, eggs, nutmeg, breadcrumbs, pepper

Agnolini (Mantuan dialect: agnulìn or agnulì) is a type of egg-based stuffed pasta originating in the province of Mantua, Italy. It is often eaten in soup or broth.

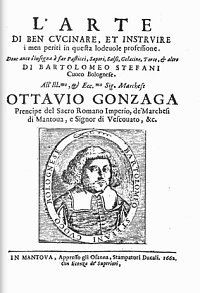
Title page of Bartolomeo Stefani's L'arte di ben cucinare (1662)

Agnolini's recipe was first published in L'arte di ben cucinare (1662) by Bartolomeo Stefani, a cook at the court of the Gonzaga family.

Agnolini is the main ingredient of soups of the Mantuan cuisine, usually consumed during holidays and important occasions. Served with chicken broth, it is a traditional Mantuan dish on Christmas Eve, alongside other traditional Mantuan dishes such as the agnolini's soup, sorbir d'agnoli, with abundant addition of Parmesan cheese. Sorbir, to which red wine is added, generally Lambrusco, represents the opening of the Christmas lunch.

Agnolini differ from the classic Emilian tortellini, to which they are similar, in their shape and ingredients for the pasta dough.

== See also ==
- Piedmontese cuisine
- List of pasta
- List of dumplings

== Bibliography ==
- Anon (1968). Istituto Carlo D'Arco per la storia di Mantova (ed.). Cucina mantovana di principi e di popolo. Testi antichi e ricette tradizionali (in Italian).
