= Pundi =

Indian rice dumpling

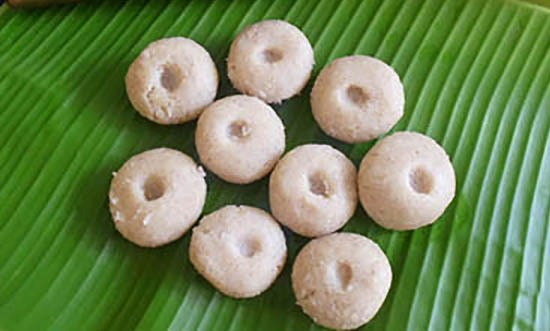
- Pundi served in traditional banana leaf
- Type: Rice dumpling
- Place of origin: India
- Region or state: Tulu Nadu, Karnataka
- Main ingredients: Rice

Pundi or Pundi Gatti is a round shaped soft rice dumpling belonging to Mangalorean cuisine, native to Tulu Nadu region of India. It is prepared by soaking, grinding, tempering, cooking and finally steaming the rice. Pundi Gatti is popularly known as Pundi in Udupi and Mangalore cities of Karnataka state. Like most of the Mangalorean breakfast recipes it is usually served with coconut chutney.

It is also made with jaggery and grated coconut filling, known as Cheepe Pundi in Tulu.

A variation of the dish is known as oondee or undee, which is made of semolina or rice and is a breakfast delicacy in Konkani cuisine. It is traditionally made by soaking and flattening rice by pounding on it, although in modern times ready-made idli rava is used instead. It is prepared by cooking boiling rava (semolina) with coconut, sugar, salt and traditional spices until it becomes semi-hard. The mass is shaped into spheres about four inches in diameter and steamed.

== See also ==
- List of dumplings

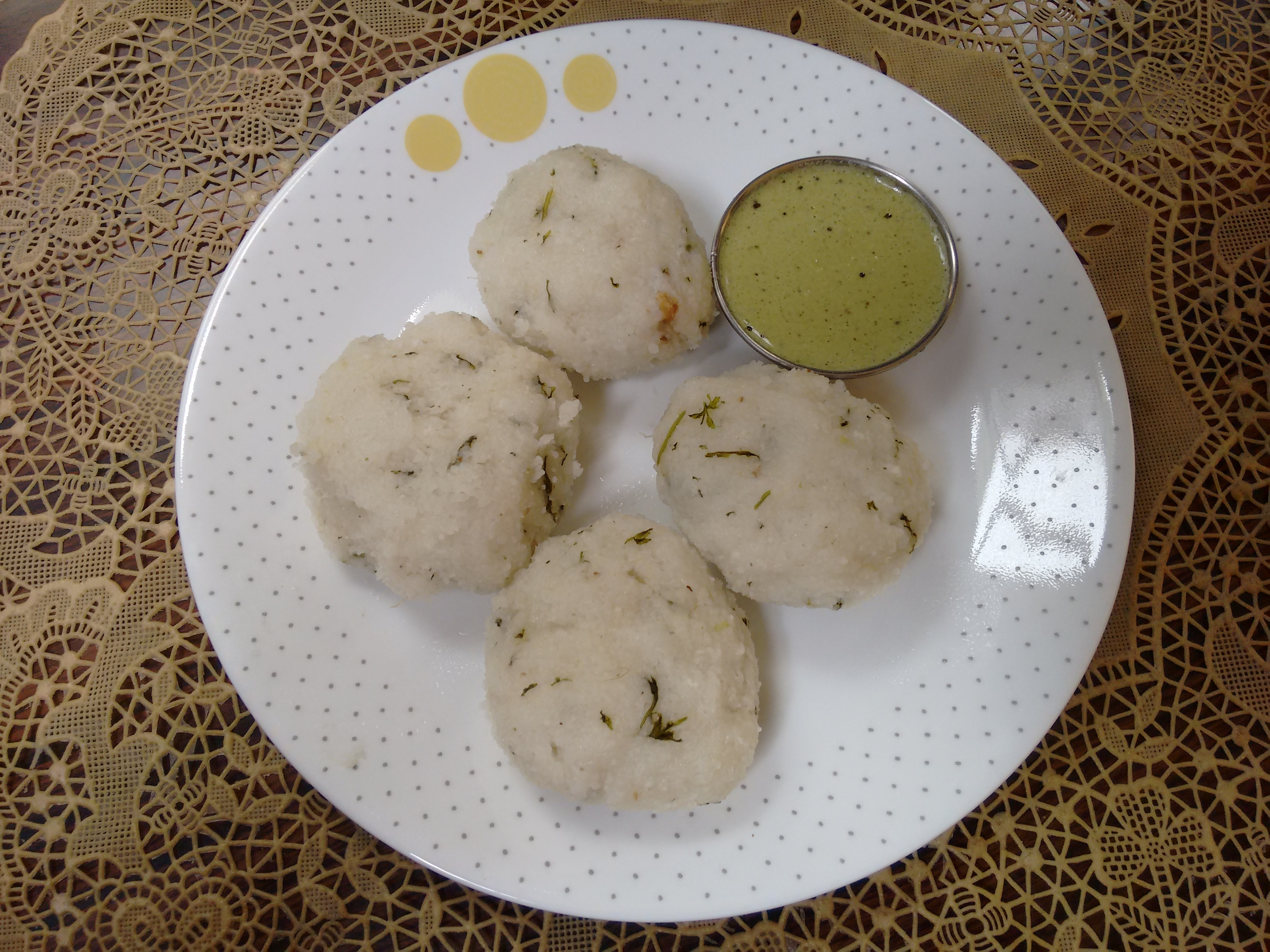
Pundi Gatti with Coriander Chutney
