= Spoja lorda =

Type of square filled egg pasta

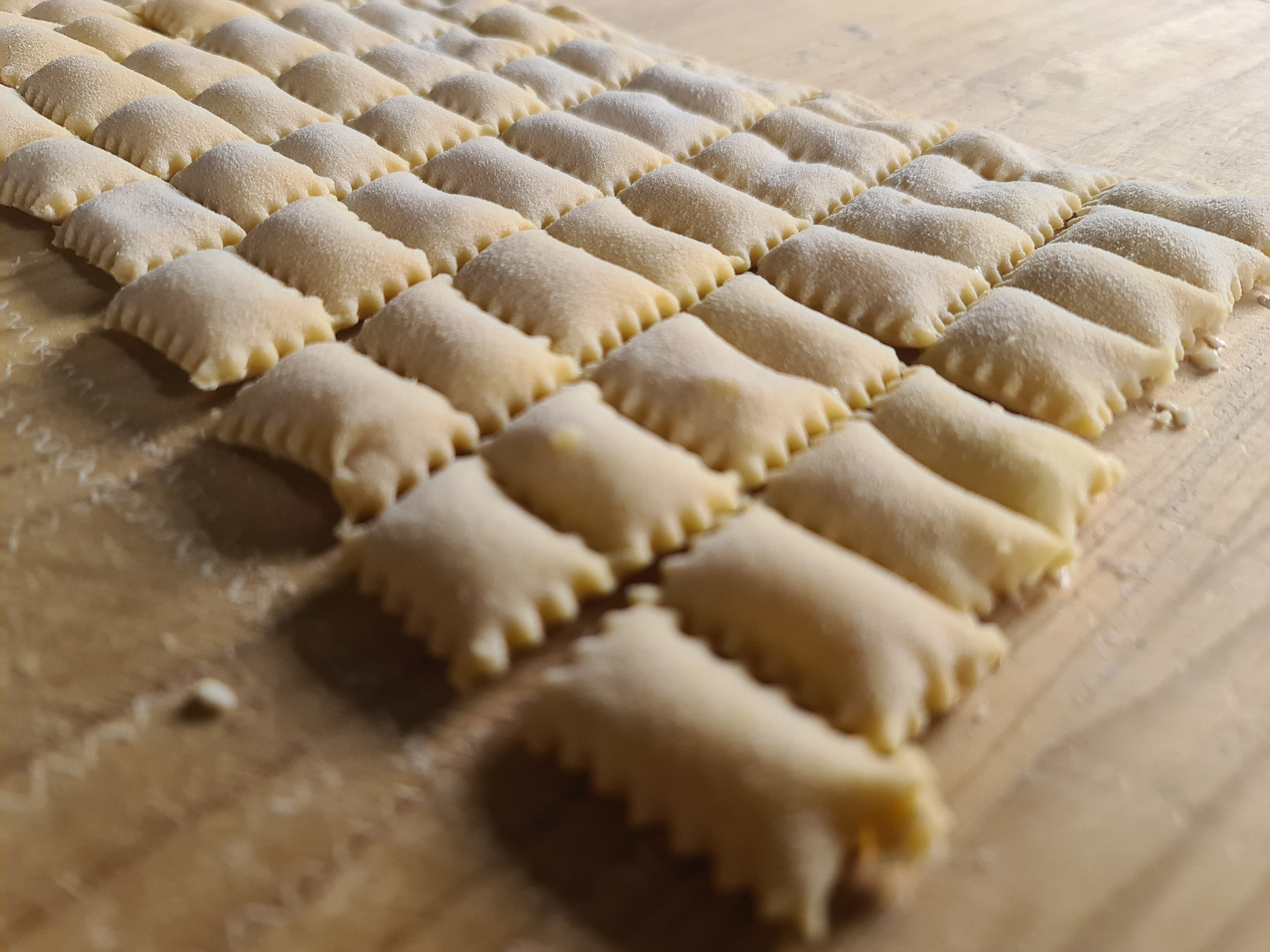
- Course: First course
- Region or state: Italy, Romagna

Spoja lorda or stuffed soup is a type of filled egg pasta with a square shape, similar to ravioli. It is typical of Romagna, particularly in the province of Ravenna and Faenza, where it is traditionally served in broth as a first course on holidays. The name spoja lorda derives from the use of the leftover dough from the preparation of cappelletti or, alternatively, from a dialectal expression used to describe a dough with scant filling and, therefore, just "dirty".

== Preparation ==
It is made from a dough prepared with eggs and flour and then cut in half. A filling based on fresh cheese is spread on one of the two sheets (traditionally squacquerone or raviggiolo, alternatively, casatella romagnola, robiola or ricotta), Parmesan, nutmeg, eggs and salt, on which the second sheet is then rolled out to close, avoiding letting the filling come out of the edges.

Subsequently, small squares (about 2 cm per side) are cut out with a toothed wheel, from which the typical pointed edge derives. They are boiled for a few minutes in meat broth and sprinkled with grated Parmesan cheese.
