= Mera Pitha =

Rice dumpling pitha originating from Bangladesh

- Alternative names: Daullah, Chua Pitha, Gurguria, Gota Pitha
- Course: Pitha
- Place of origin: Bangladesh
- Region or state: Mymensingh
- Associated cuisine: Bangladesh
- Main ingredients: Rice flour, molasses, coconuts
- Other information: served with meat curry, jaggery

Mera (Bengali: মেরা, romanized: Mērā, also spelled ম্যারা, Myārā) or Daullah is a type of rice dumpling which is very popular in Bangladesh especially in Sylhet and Mymensingh and neighbouring districts. It is made of rice flour, salt, molasses, coconut etc. In some areas it is also called Gota Pitha or Bhapa Channai.

== Ingredients ==
- Ground rice flour
- Molasses and/or salt
- Coconuts
