= Boraki =

Armenian cuisine

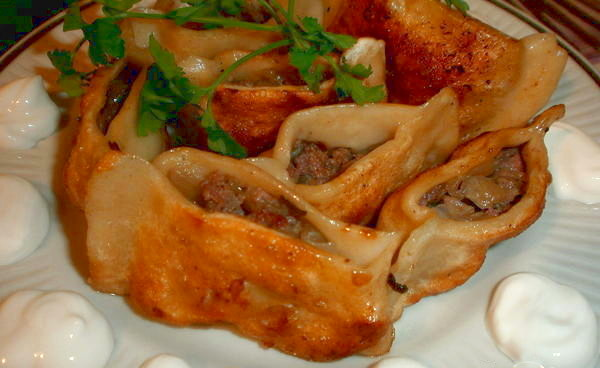
- Alternative names: Alboraki; Tatar-boraki
- Course: Main course
- Place of origin: Armenia
- Region or state: Armenian highlands
- Associated cuisine: Armenian cuisine
- Serving temperature: Hot
- Main ingredients: Dough, minced meat (usually beef), onions, herbs, spices
- Variations: Dough-only boraki

Boraki (Armenian: բորակի, Armenian pronunciation: [bɔɾɑˈki]), also known as alboraki (Armenian: ալբորակի) and tatar-boraki (Armenian: թաթար-բորակի), is a traditional Armenian dish made with minced meat, onions, and various spices, wrapped in layers of dough. It is a common dish among Armenians and is widespread throughout nearly the entire territory of Armenia.

== Description ==
Boraki are typically cylindrical in shape, with an open top that reveals the filling. The minced meat mixture is usually pre-cooked before assembling the dish. The filled dough pieces are placed vertically in a pot, a small amount of broth is added, and they are simmered over low heat. Once cooked, the boraki are often pan-fried until a golden crust forms.

The dough is made from flour, egg, and water. The filling typically consists of beef (though other meats may be used), onion, pepper, and fresh herbs. The finished dish is traditionally served with matzoon mixed with minced garlic.

== Variations ==
=== Meat boraki ===
To prepare the dough, sifted flour is shaped into a mound with a well in the center, into which salt, eggs, and water are added. The dough is kneaded until smooth, rolled out into a thin sheet, and cut into 5–6 cm squares or round pieces, which are dusted with flour.

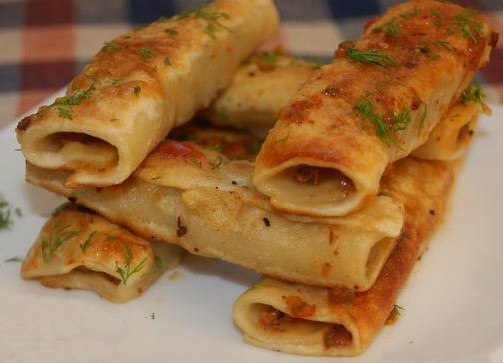
Boraki

The meat and onion are ground, mixed with salt, pepper, and herbs, and lightly fried. A small amount of the filling is placed in the center of each dough piece, and the edges are pinched together so that the filling remains visible in the center.

The prepared boraki are placed in a pot with a small amount of broth, covered, and simmered until done. After cooking, they are removed, allowed to drain, and then fried in a pan until golden.

=== Dough-only boraki ===
For this variation, sifted flour is combined with salt, eggs, and water to make a dough, which is then rolled out thinly and cut into strips, and then into small square pieces.

These dough pieces are boiled in salted water until they float to the surface. After boiling, they are drained, plated, and served with melted butter or sour cream.
