= Cho muang =

Thai snack dish

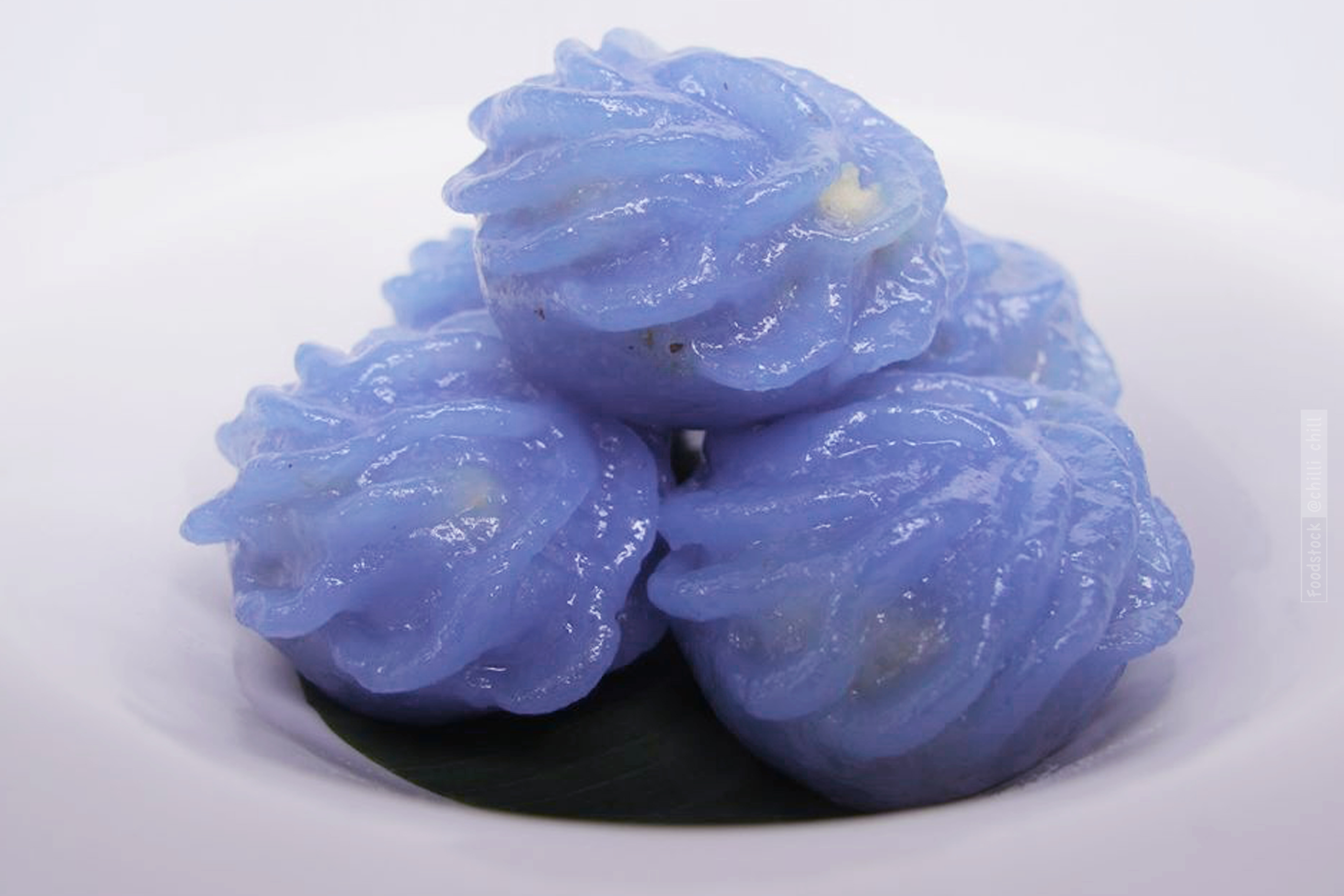
- Alternative names: Chor muang
- Type: Snack
- Place of origin: Thailand
- Region or state: Central Thailand
- Created by: Thai Royal Kitchen
- Serving temperature: Warm
- Main ingredients: Garlic, pepper, coriander roots, vegetables, chicken, pork

Cho muang or chor muang (Thai: ช่อม่วง, pronounced [t͡ɕʰɔ̂ː mûa̯ŋ]), sometimes referred to as "Thai flower dumpling", is a traditional Thai savory snack. Its existence has been documented since the reign of King Rama II, where it is mentioned in the Kap He Chom Khrueang Khao Wan poem. Cho muang is regarded as an ancient royal dish and is often recognized by its carved flower-shaped appearance and indigo coloring from the anchan (butterfly pea) flower. The steamed dumpling is formed into a flower-shape and contains either a salty or sweet filling. It is then served with lettuce, coriander and chili. The original recipe of cho muang contained a sweet filling and was later developed with the savory filling. The name cho muang means 'violet bouquet' in the Thai language. The name comes from the appearance of several flowers in a traditional plate arrangement.

The exterior batter is made from rice flour, arrowroot flour and tapioca flour stirred together in a brass pan. The violet color of the exterior batter comes from a butterfly pea color mixed with a few drops of lime juice. A seasoned meat filling, such as shrimp, fish, pork, or chicken, is fried with coriander root, garlic, and pepper until dry. The filling is then coated with batter and molded into the shape of a flower using tweezers to create the petal shapes of a flower before being steamed. After the steaming process, the dumplings are sprayed with fresh coconut milk to honor their original creation as a sweet snack.

Because the delicate process of creating the intricate flower shape requires time-consuming craftsmanship, and due to the limited amount of time it can remain moist, cho muang has become rare to find in a typical Thailand market. Cho muang is now only often found in special dessert houses.

== Background ==
Cho muang was first documented during King Rama II's rule. Its unique appearance represents a rose, which is a very common recognized identity of cho muang. The middle of this snack usually contains seasonings such as garlic, pepper, and coriander roots. These spice mixtures are commonly the main seasoning of Thai food and Thai snacks in general.

Cho muang has the sweet scent of a flower, and is purple like the Poudean flower (Hibiscus mutabilis). So, it looks like a woman that wears a purple shawl.

The poetry of Jinwell II has content from a Thai poem called Kap He Chom Khrueang Kho Wan. This snack was created by the Thai Royal Kitchen which is also known as Chao Wang's kitchen. The poems (which was the first mention of this snack) explained information about both Thai dessert and Thai food. The meaning of one of the verses is that the cho muang has the sweet smell and taste of a flower. The colour of the cho muang is purple like the colour of the Poudean flower. The cho muang is like a gorgeous woman with her head wrapped in a purple shawl.

== Characteristics ==
Nowadays, Cho Muang is a rare Thai snack. It is expensive because it requires a lot of skill and effort to make. Cho muang is commonly shaped like a rose, but can be found in many different shapes. The hue is similar to a purple rose, and comes from a mixture of blue pea and lemon juice.
