= Abacus seeds =

Hakka stir-fried taro dumplings

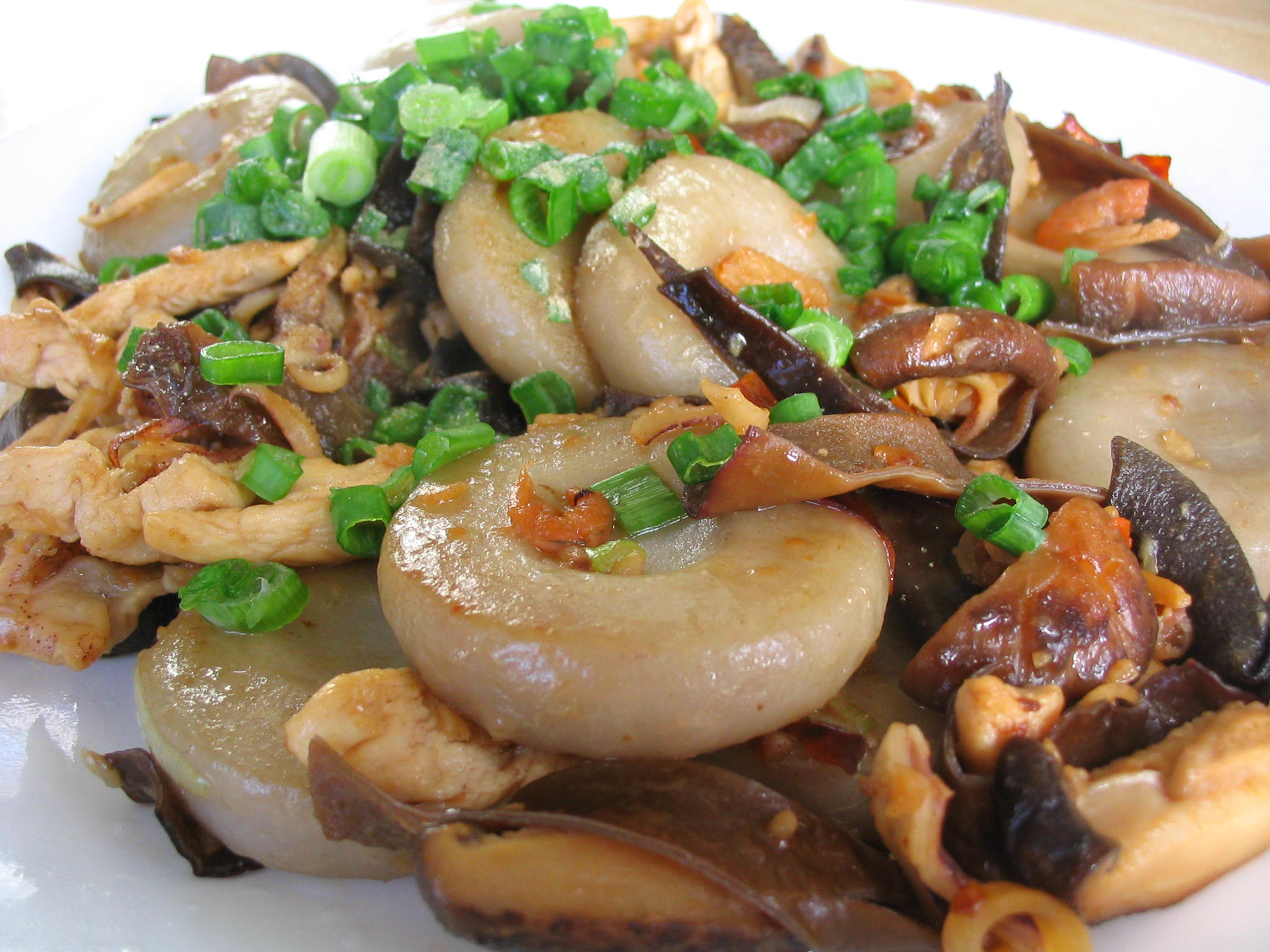
- Type: Main course
- Place of origin: China
- Main ingredients: Taro, tapioca flour

Abacus seeds
- Traditional Chinese: 算盤子
- Simplified Chinese: 算盘子
- Literal meaning: "abacus seeds"
Transcriptions
Standard Mandarin
- Hanyu Pinyin: suànpánzǐ
Yue: Cantonese
- Jyutping: syun3 pun4 zi2

Abacus seeds (Chinese: 算盘子) or abacus beads is a Hakka Chinese dish consisting of dimpled, disc-shaped dumplings made with taro and tapioca flour. The dumplings are boiled then stir-fried with minced pork, shiitake or wood ear mushrooms, dried shrimp, dried cuttlefish and firm bean curd.

Due to its association with the abacus and counting money, the dish is eaten during festivals such as Chinese New Year to signify wealth and prosperity. The dumplings' round shape is also said to represent reunion and good health.

It can be found in parts of China, Taiwan, Malaysia and Singapore, and in cities with a large Hakka population.

== History ==
Abacus seeds date back to the Song dynasty. It was prepared by Hakka women for the men of the village to carry with them when they ventured out to look for work. The dish was both a food and also a symbolic wish that the men would find success and earn more money to count with an abacus.

== Gallery ==
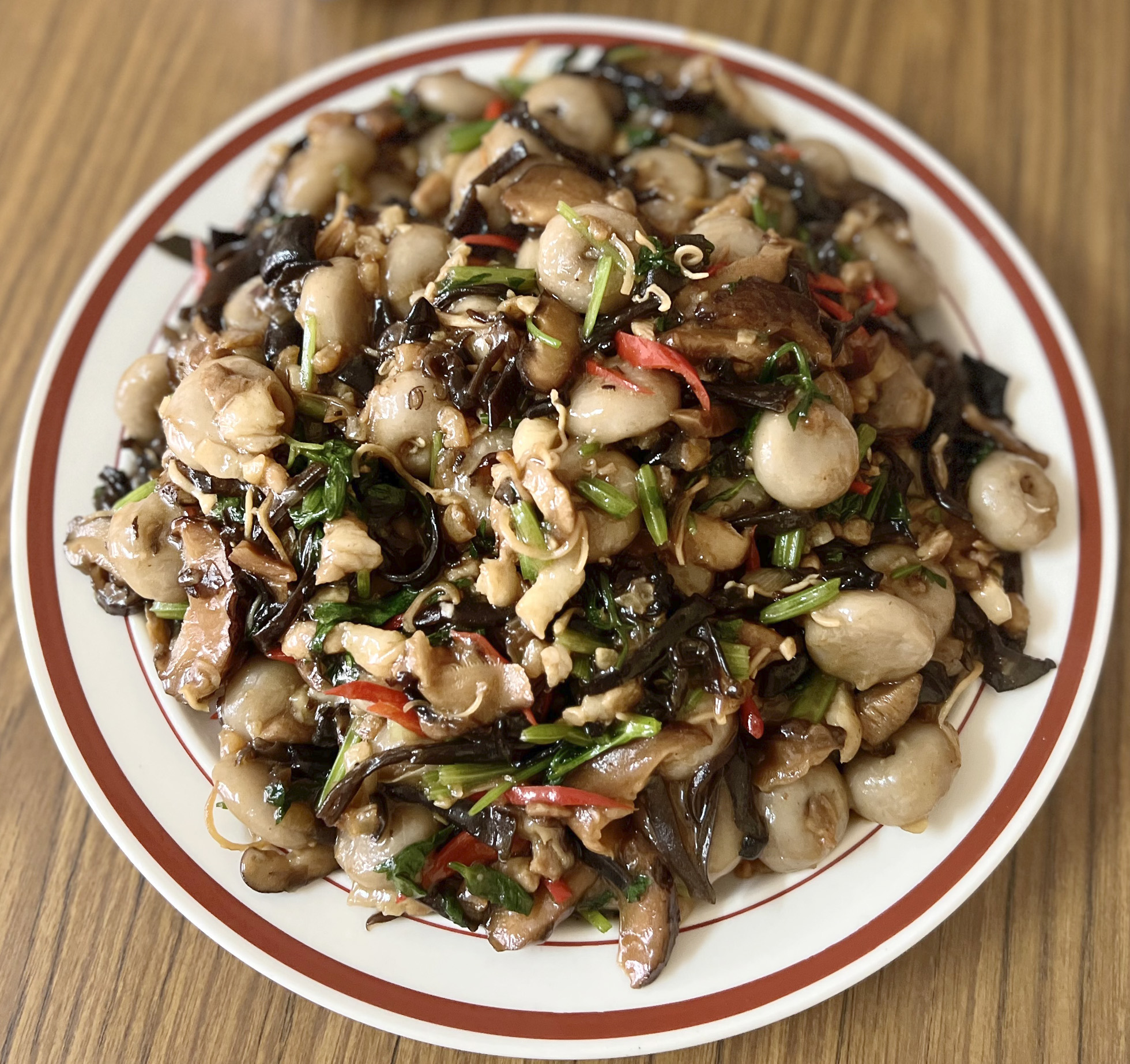

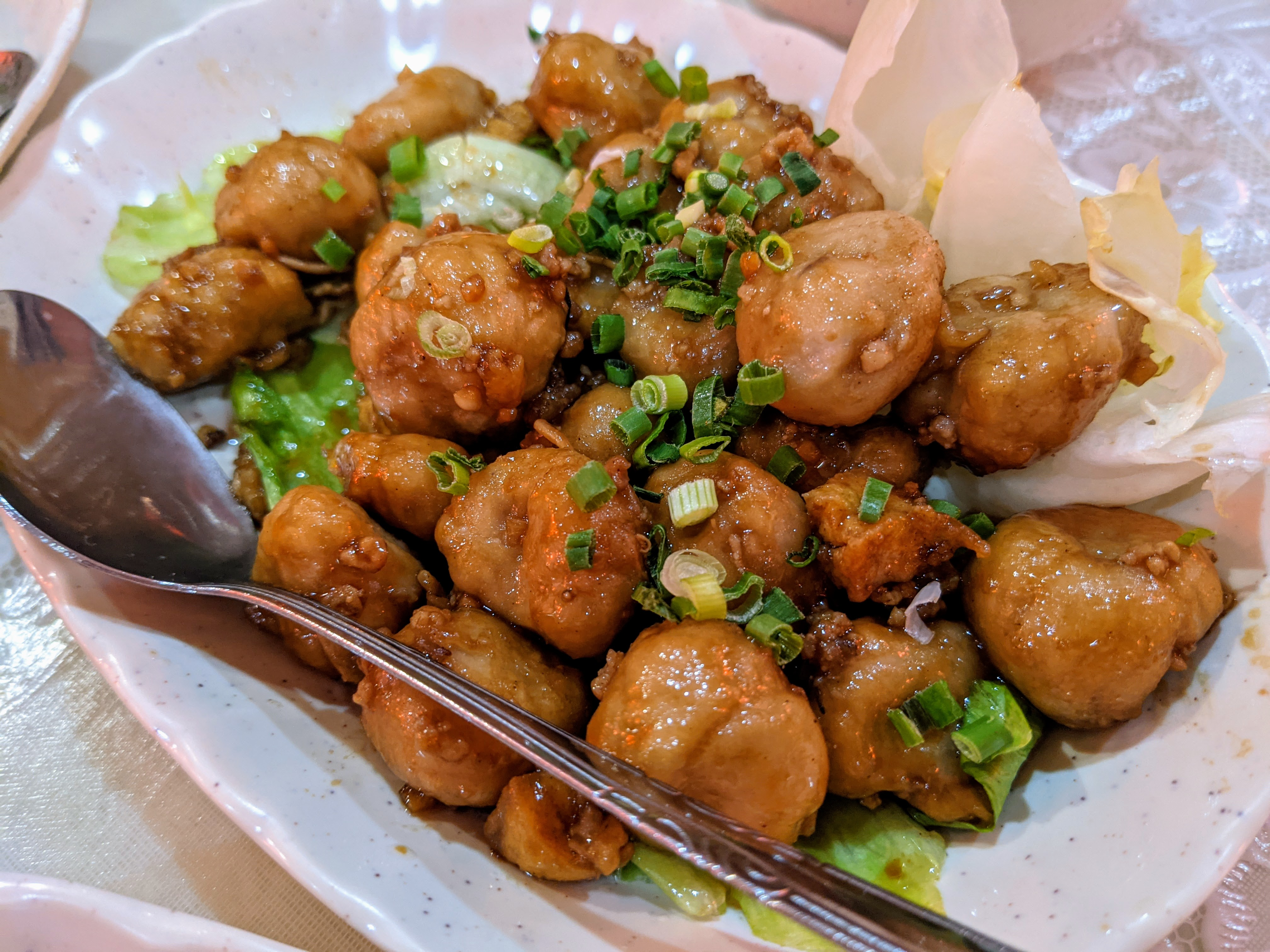

== See also ==
- List of dumplings
