= Šúľance =

Slovak potato gnocchi

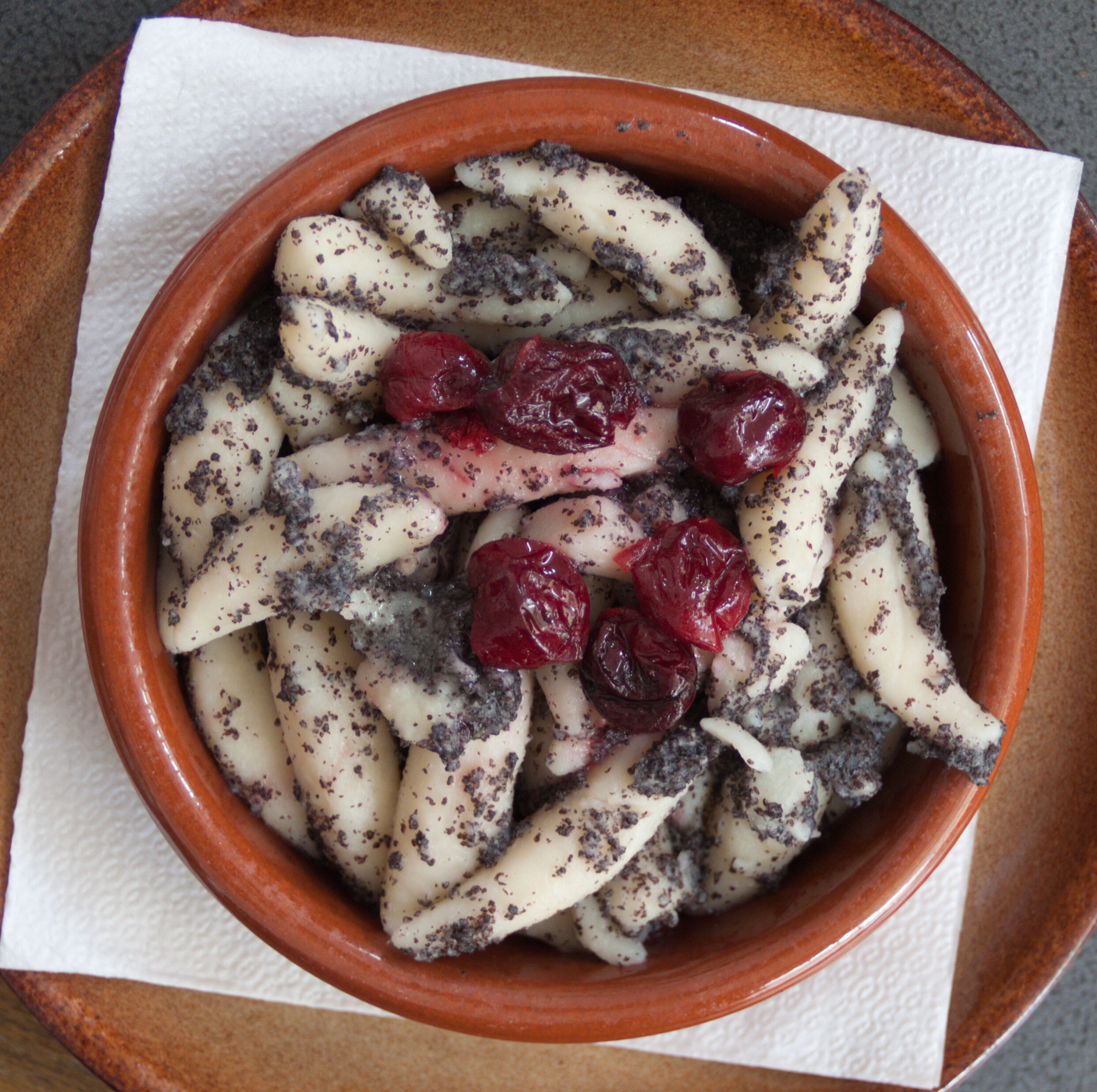
Šúľance with poppy seeds

Šúľance (Slovak pronunciation: ['ʂuːʎantse], literally Rolls, singular: šúľanec, dialectally bedere, cibliky, cikoški, kokocíky, kokoški, kokošky, šuferle or škorce) are Slovak potato gnocchi typically prepared with sugar or poppy seeds. The name of the dish comes from the Slovak word šúľať, which means “to roll”.

In 2018, the šúlance rolling competition called “Budeme šúľať” was held in Piešťany.

== Literature ==
- Kuchárska knižka: Naše kulinárske dedičstvo – spájame chute pohraničia. Miestna akčná skupina Terchovská Dolina, 2021. ISBN 978-83-8056-329-2. Disponible online
