= Orama (dish) =

Central Asian steamed pie

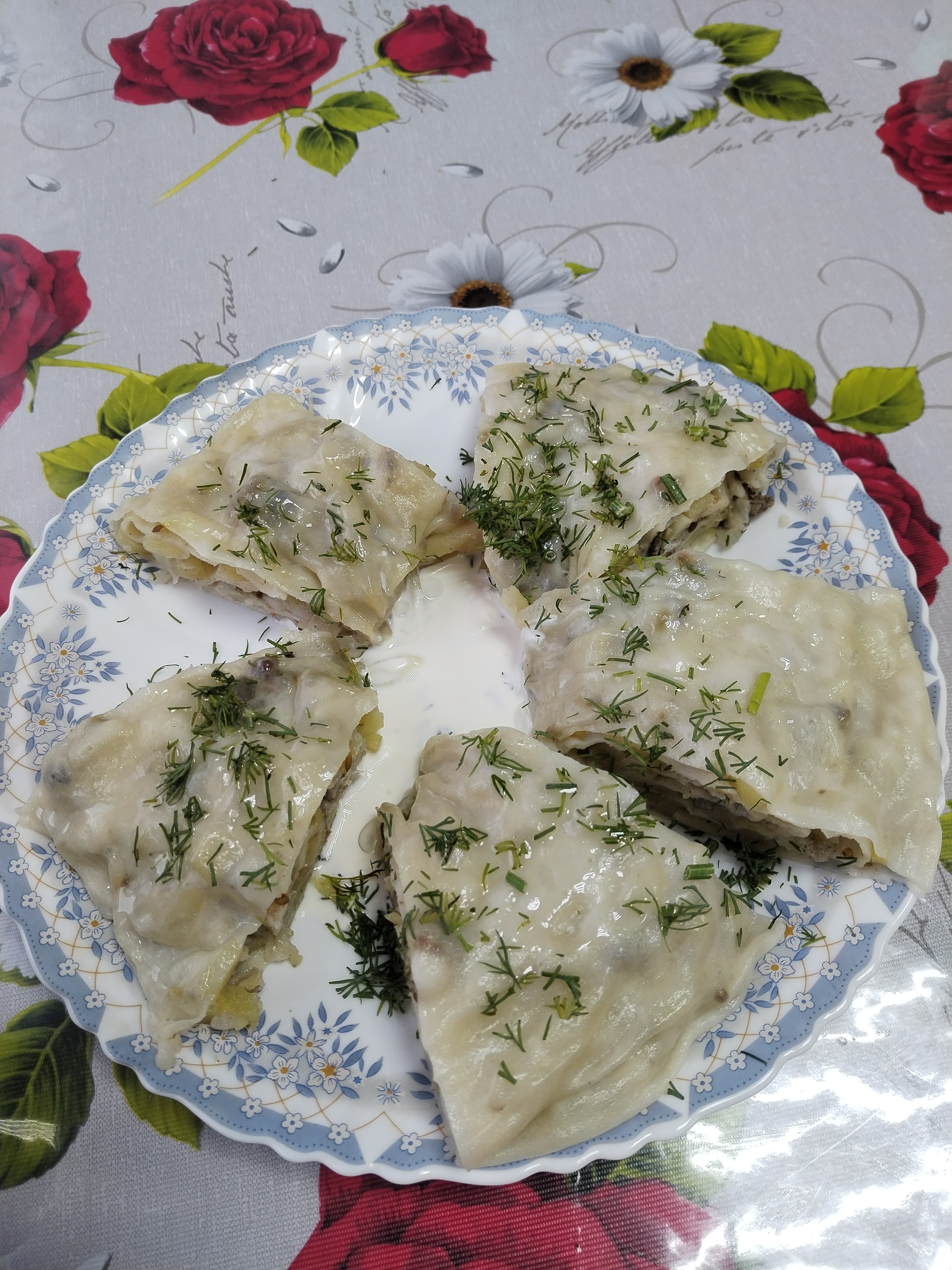
- Type: Dumpling
- Main ingredients: Dough: flour, water, salt Filling: meat, potatoes, animal fat, sometimes pumpkin

Orama (Kazakh: орама), (Kyrgyz: оромо, Mongolian: ороомог, Bashkir: ханума, romanized: xanuma) is a traditional steamed pie made in Central Asia, especially among the Kazakh, Kyrgyz, Uzbeks, Bashkirs and the Mongolians. The name comes from a nominalisation of the word "to roll"/"to wrap", referring to how the food is made.

The dough for orama is made from flour, water, and salt. It is kneaded and rolled thin, and a filling is spread over it. The filling may contain minced potatoes, minced meat, animal fat, and sometimes minced pumpkin or some other vegetable. The dough is then rolled around the filling in sections to create a long, thin wrap. The wraps are laid in a circle in steamer pots and steamed.
