= Knödel =

Large round poached or boiled potato or bread dumplings, made without yeast

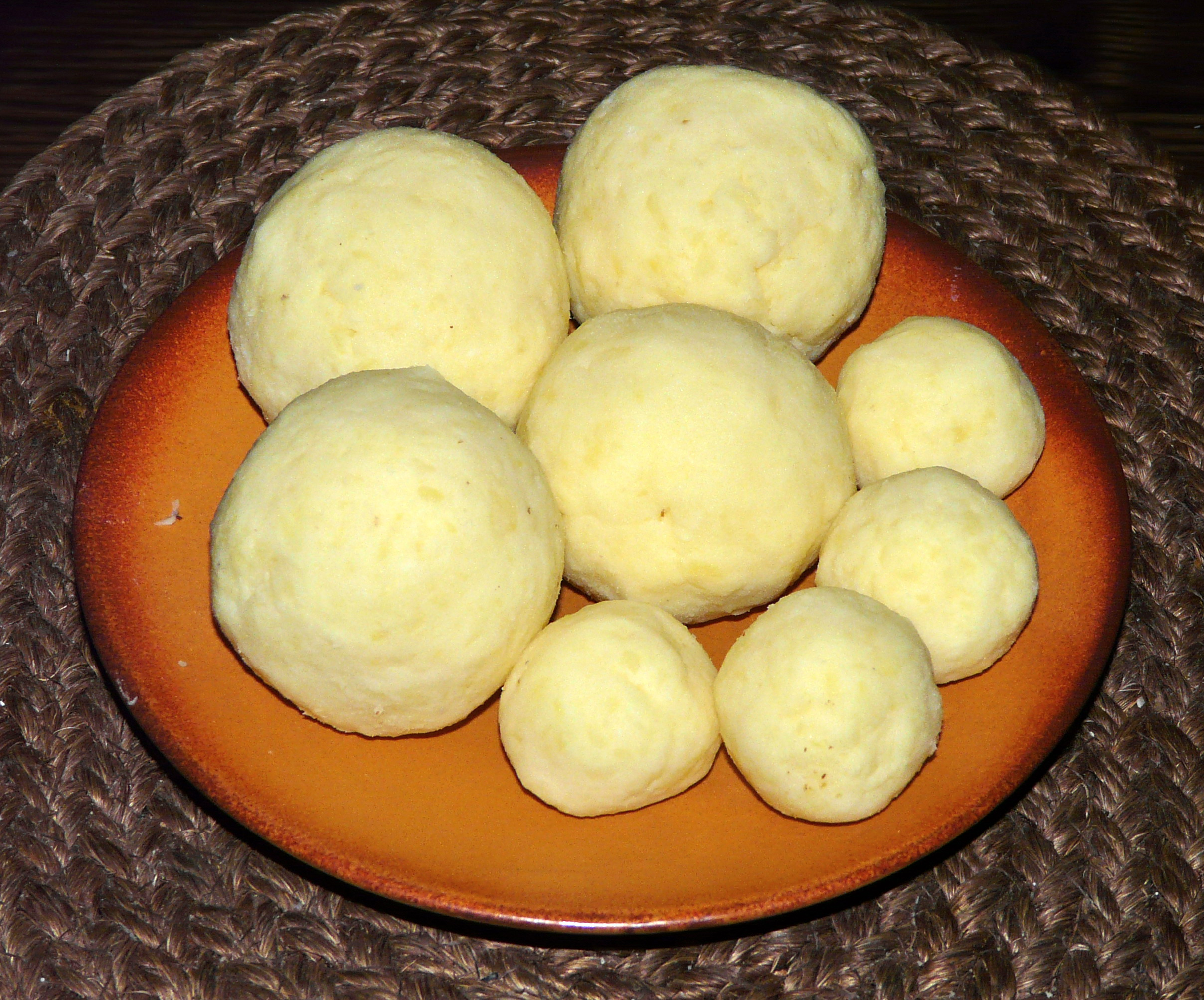
- Raw Klöße of various sizes
- Alternative names: See below
- Type: Dumpling
- Region or state: Central Europe
- Main ingredients: Potatoes or bread or flour
- Variations: See list

Knödel (German: [ˈknøːdl̩]; sing. and pl.) or Klöße (German: [ˈkløːsə]; sing.: Kloß) are boiled dumplings commonly found in Central European and Eastern European cuisine. Countries in which their variant of Knödel is popular include Austria, Bosnia, Croatia, Czech Republic, Germany, Poland, Romania, Serbia, Slovakia and Slovenia. Similar dishes can be found in most other European cuisines, such as Scandinavian, Romanian, Italian, Jewish, Ukrainian and Belarusian cuisines. Usually made from flour, bread or potatoes, they are often served as a side dish, but can also be a dessert such as plum dumplings, or even meat balls in soup. Many varieties and variations exist.

== Etymology ==
The word Knödel is German and is cognate with the English word knot and the Latin word nōdus 'knot'. Through the Old High German chnodo and the Middle High German knode it finally changed to the modern expression. Knödel in Hungary are called gombóc or knédli; in Slovenia, cmoki or (vulgarly) knedl(j)i; in the Czech Republic, knedlíky (singular knedlík); in Slovakia, knedle (singular knedľa); in Luxembourg, Kniddel(en); in Bosnia, Croatia, Poland and Serbia, knedle; in Bukovina, cnidle or cnigle. The same German roots are found in these Romance languages: France has quenelles, and large gnocchi are called canederli [kaˈneːderli; kaˈnɛːderli] in Italian; bales is the Ladin word for the same dish. In some regions of the United States, klub is used to refer specifically to potato dumplings. A similar dish is known in Sweden (kroppkakor or pitepalt) and in Norway (raspeball or komle), filled with salty meat; and in Canada (poutine râpée).

== Varieties ==
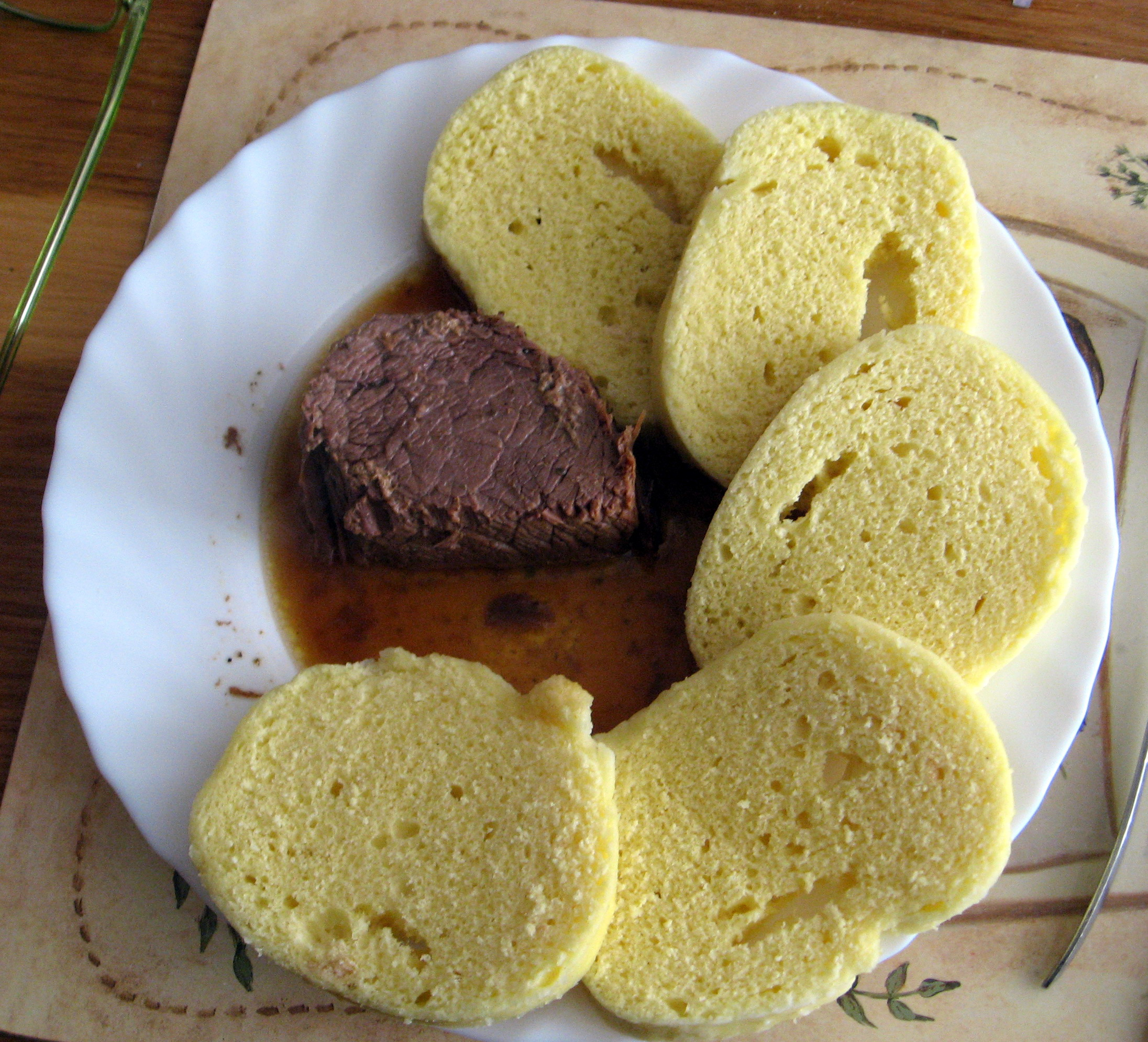
Meat with Czech dumplings (knedlíky)

Knödel are used in various dishes in Austrian, German, Slovak and Czech cuisine. From these regions, Knödel spread throughout Europe. Klöße are also large dumplings, steamed or boiled in hot water, made of dough from grated raw or mashed potatoes, eggs and flour. Similar semolina crack dumplings are made with semolina, egg and butter called Grießklößchen (Austrian German: Grießnockerl; Hungarian: grízgaluska; Silesian: gumiklyjza). Thüringer Klöße are made from raw or boiled potatoes, or a mixture of both, and are often filled with croutons or ham.

- Leberknödel are large dumplings made of ground liver and a batter made of bread soaked in milk and seasoned with nutmeg or other spices, boiled in beef stock and served as a soup.
- Bread dumplings (Semmelknödel) are made with dried white bread, milk and egg yolks. They are sometimes shaped like a loaf of bread and boiled in a napkin, in which case they are known as napkin dumplings or Serviettenknödel. If bacon is added, they are called Speckknödel.
- Plum dumplings (German: Zwetschgenknödel), popular over Central Europe, are large sweet dumplings made with flour and potato batter, by wrapping the potato dough around whole plums (or apricots, see Marillenknödel below), which are then boiled and rolled in hot buttered caramelized bread crumbs.
- Dumplings made with quark cheese (German: Topfenknödel; Hungarian: túrógombóc), traditionally topped with cinnamon sugar and served with apple sauce or with streusel
- In Brazil, German immigrants traditionally make Klöße with white rice, wheat flour and eggs, mixing them into a sturdy dough, shaping them into dumplings and boiling them.
- Königsberger Klopse are, unlike regular dumplings, made from ground meat and are related to Frikadeller.
- Frankenburger Bratknödel are unique to the market town of Frankenburg am Hausruck and filled with a saucy meatball.
- Kneydlach are Knödel (specifically, Semmelknödel) made from matzah meal, and originated among Ashkenazim in Eastern and Central Europe. The Yiddish word קניידל (kneydl) is cognate to Knödel, and is compounded to refer to other types of Knödel when speaking Yiddish.
- Italian gnudi
- Lithuanian cepelinai
- Polish knedle
- Marillenknödel, apricot dumplings in Austrian cuisine
- Germknödel filled with spiced powidl, topped with sugar, poppy seeds and butter

== Gallery ==
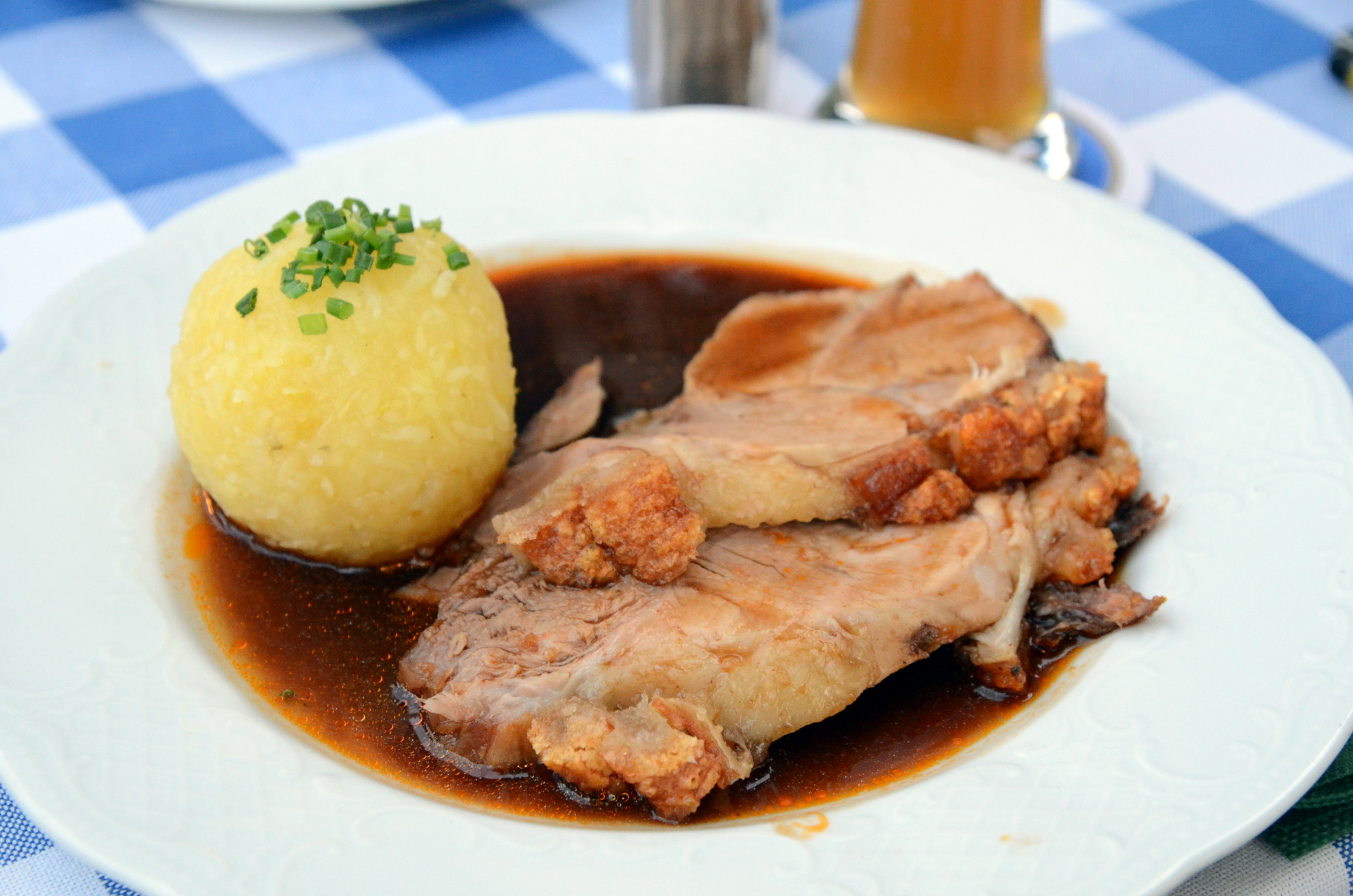
Kartoffelknödel with Schweinsbraten

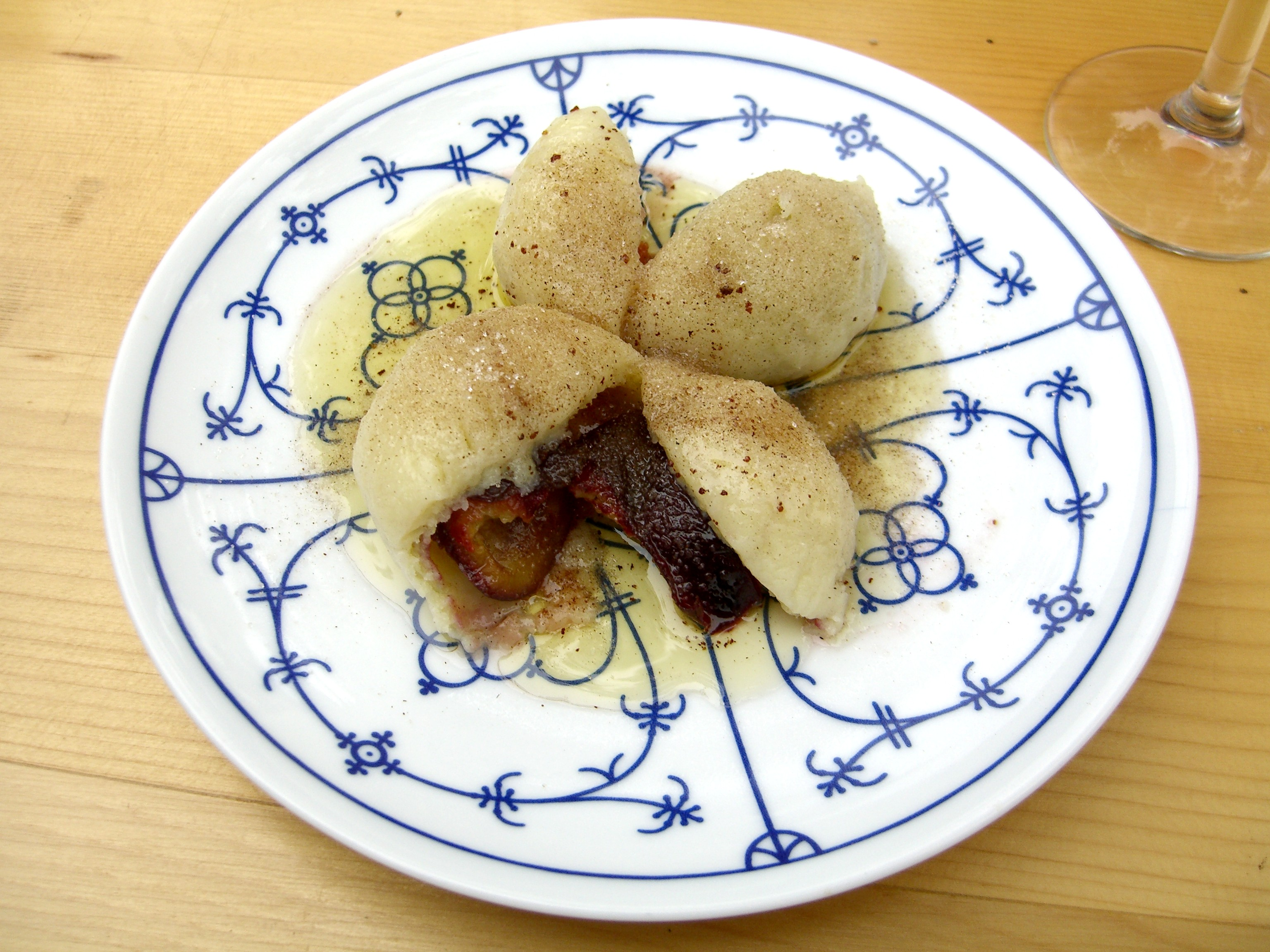
Plum dumplings (Knedle)

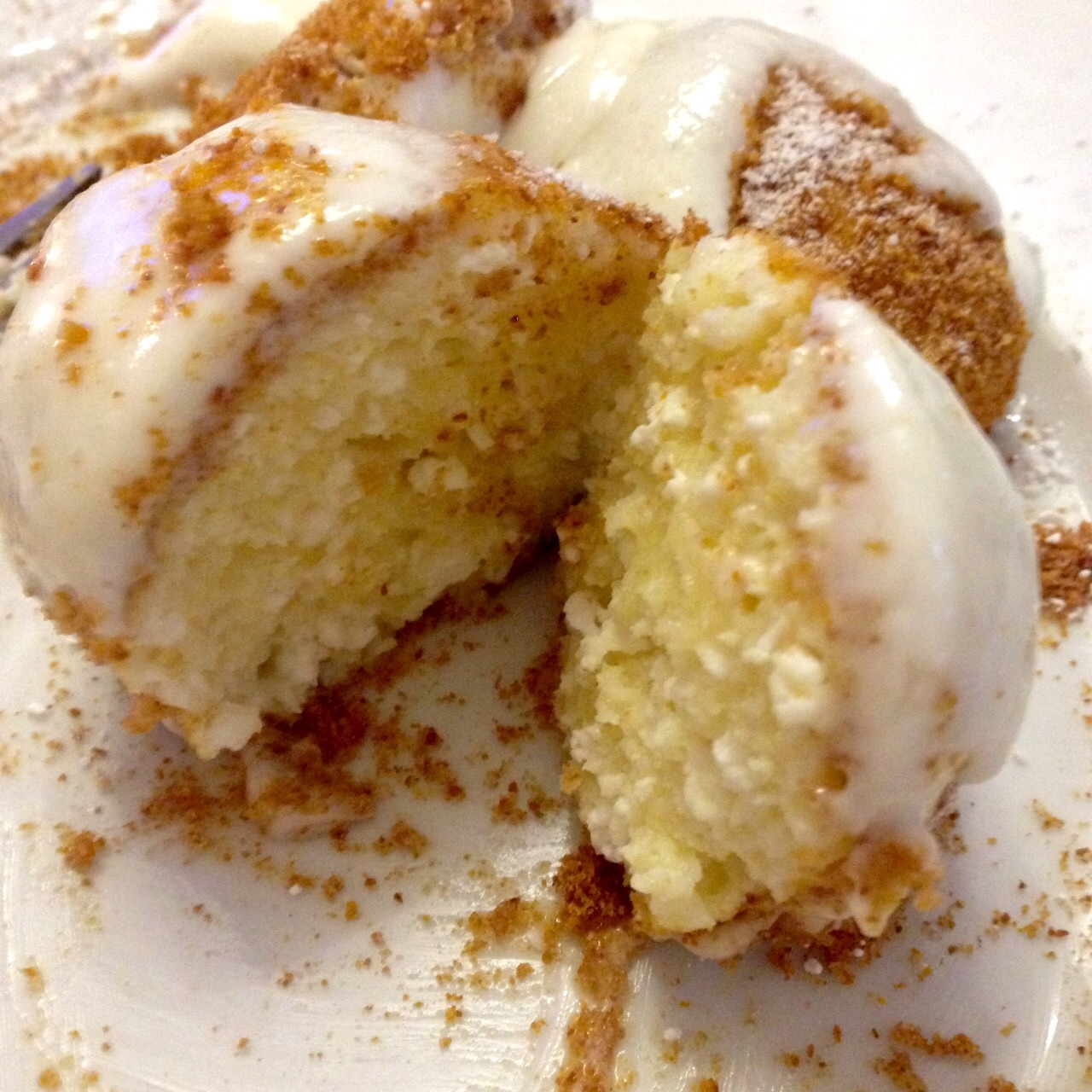
Hungarian túrógombóc, made with semolina flour and túró (curd cheese), rolled in breadcrumbs, and served with sour cream and sugar

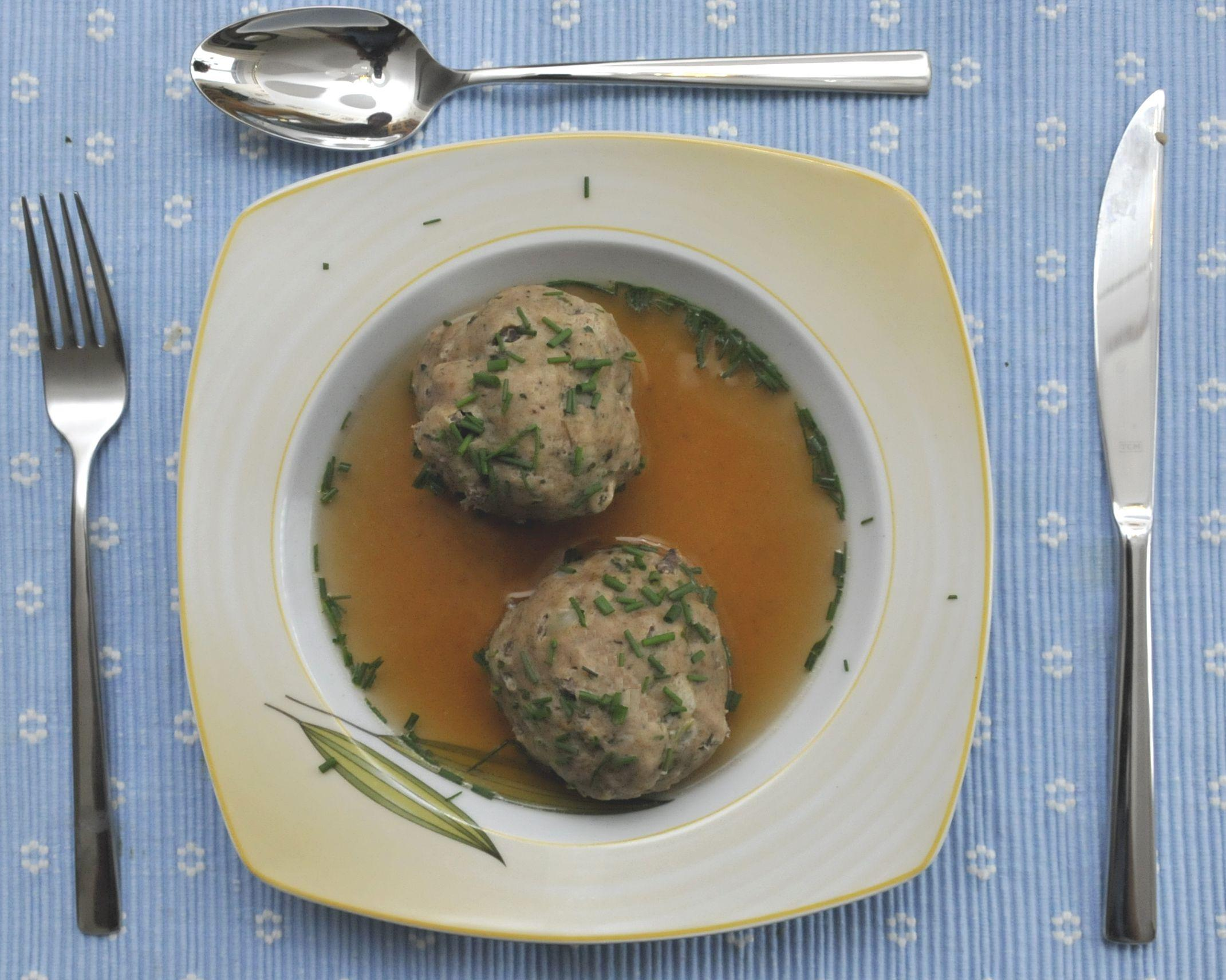
Leberknödelsuppe (liver dumplings in beef stock)

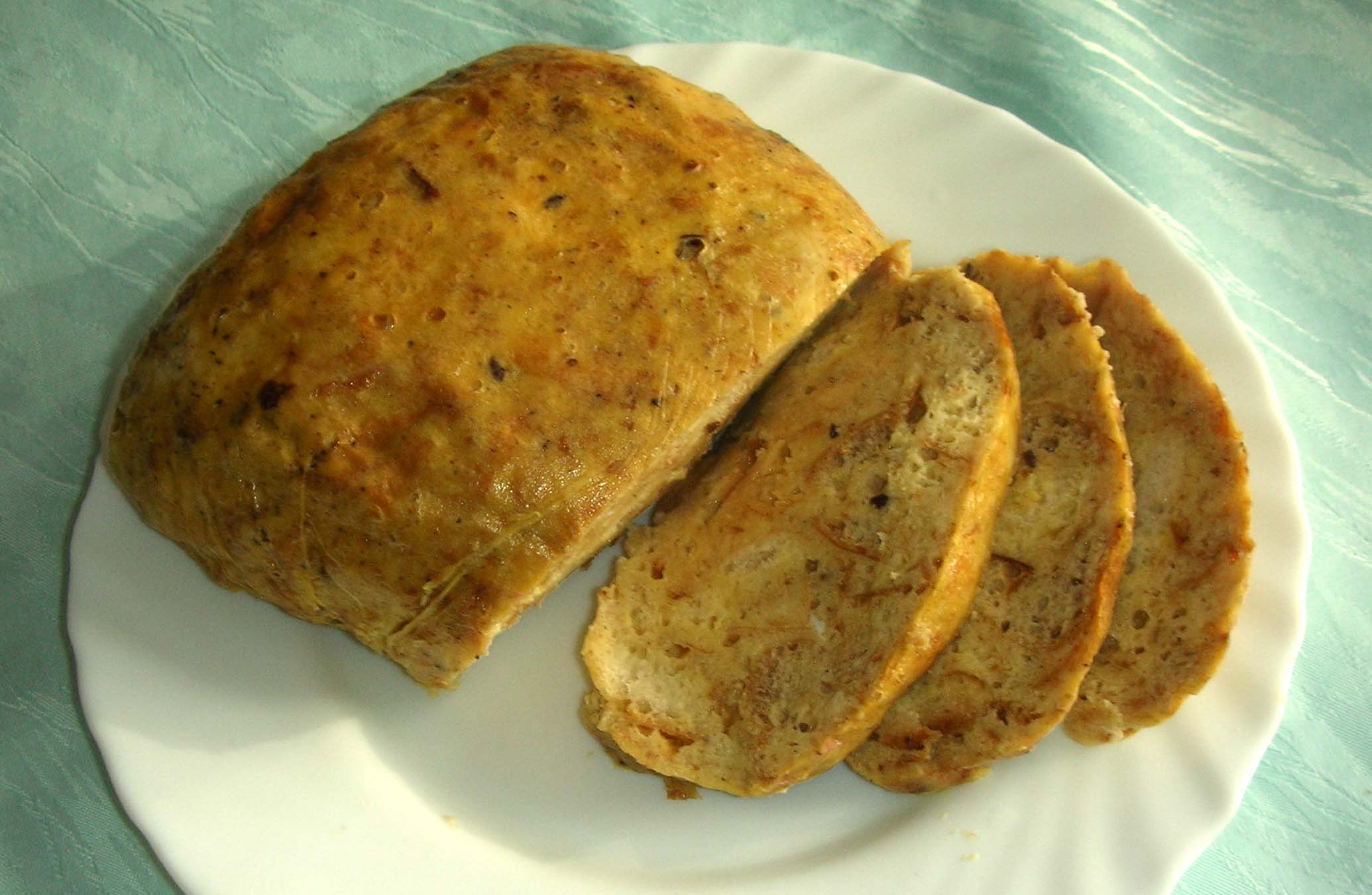
Serviettenkloß

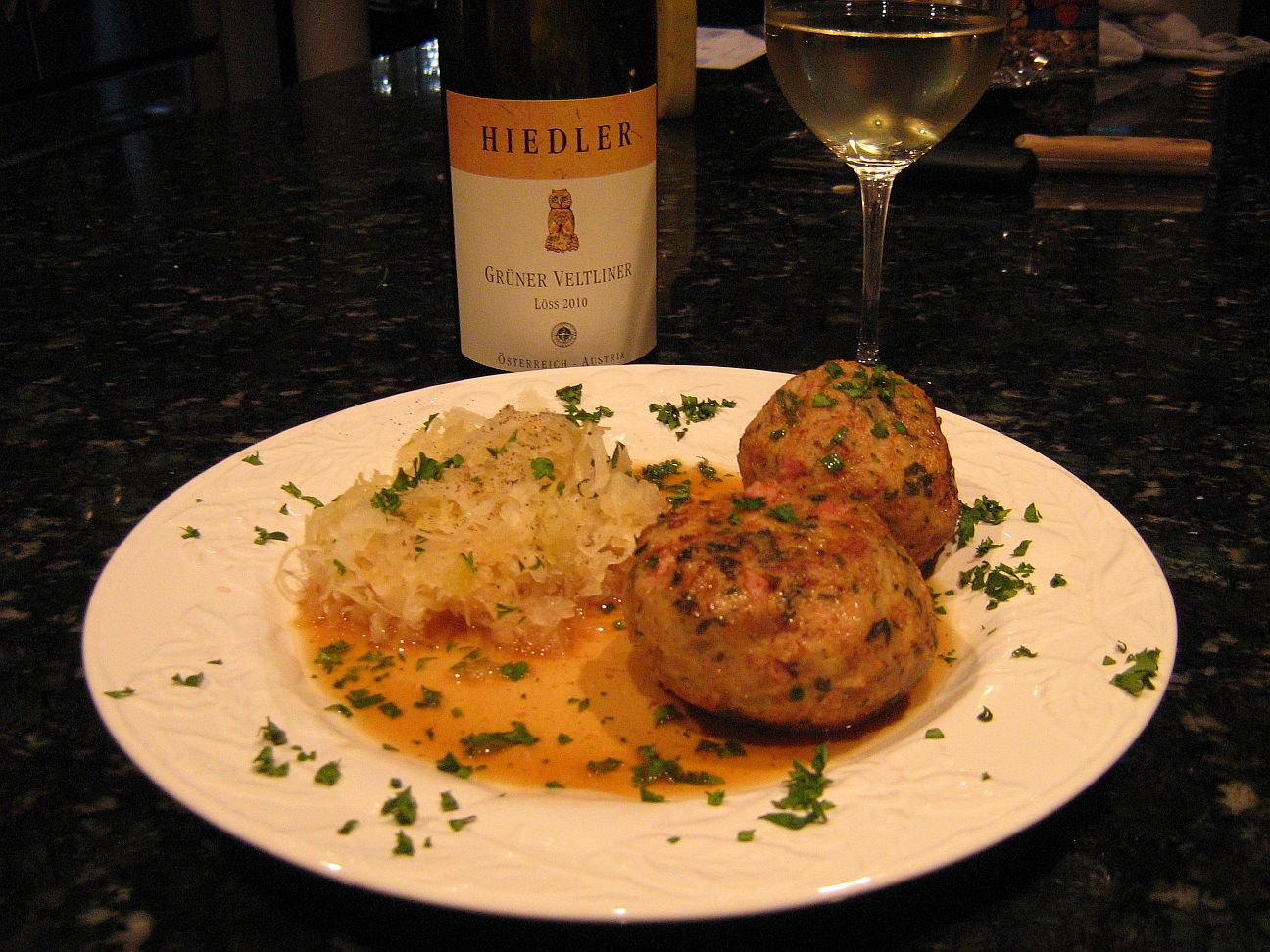
Speckknödel

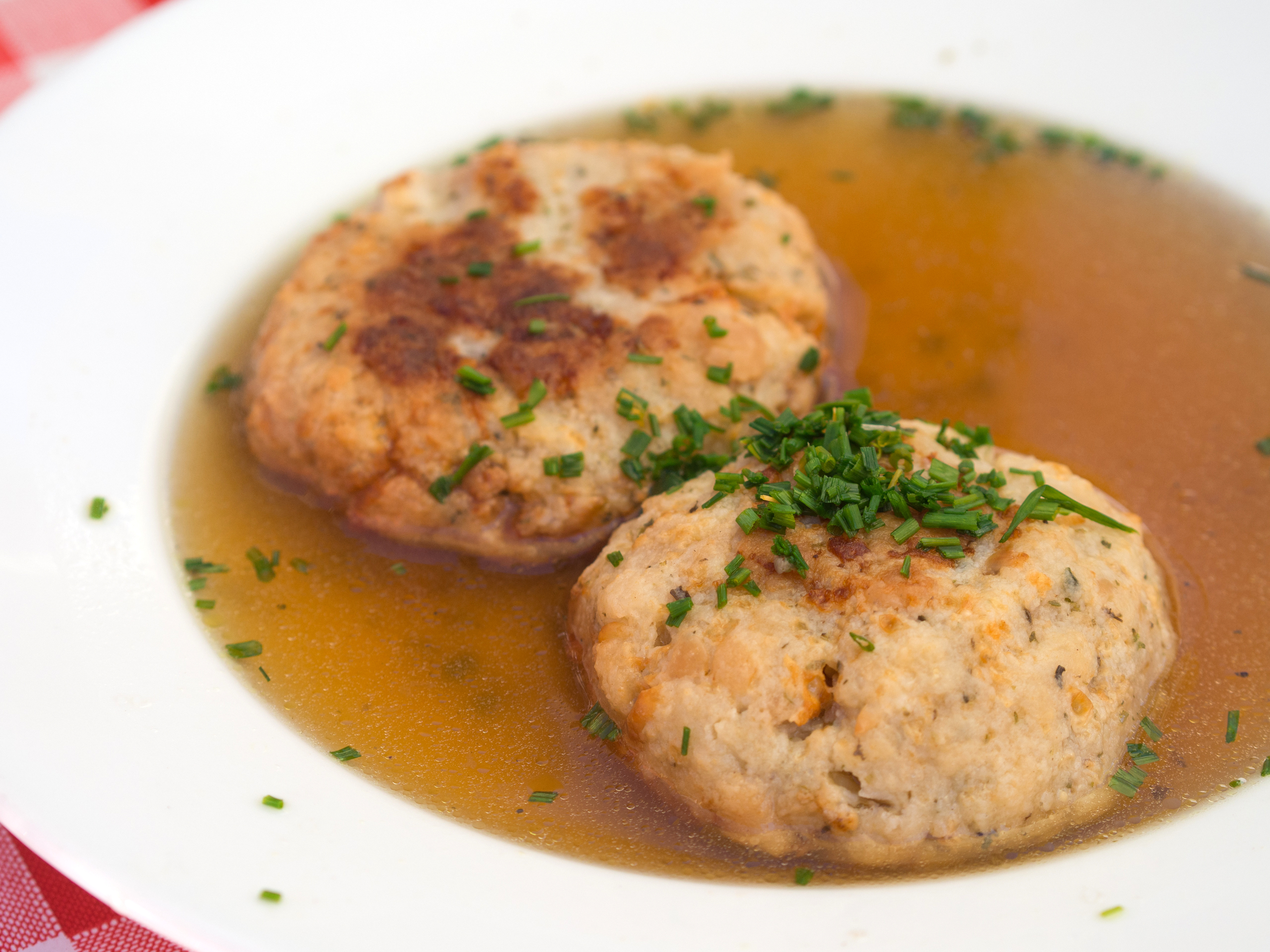
Tiroler Käseknödelsuppe, clear broth served with bread-and-cheese dumplings

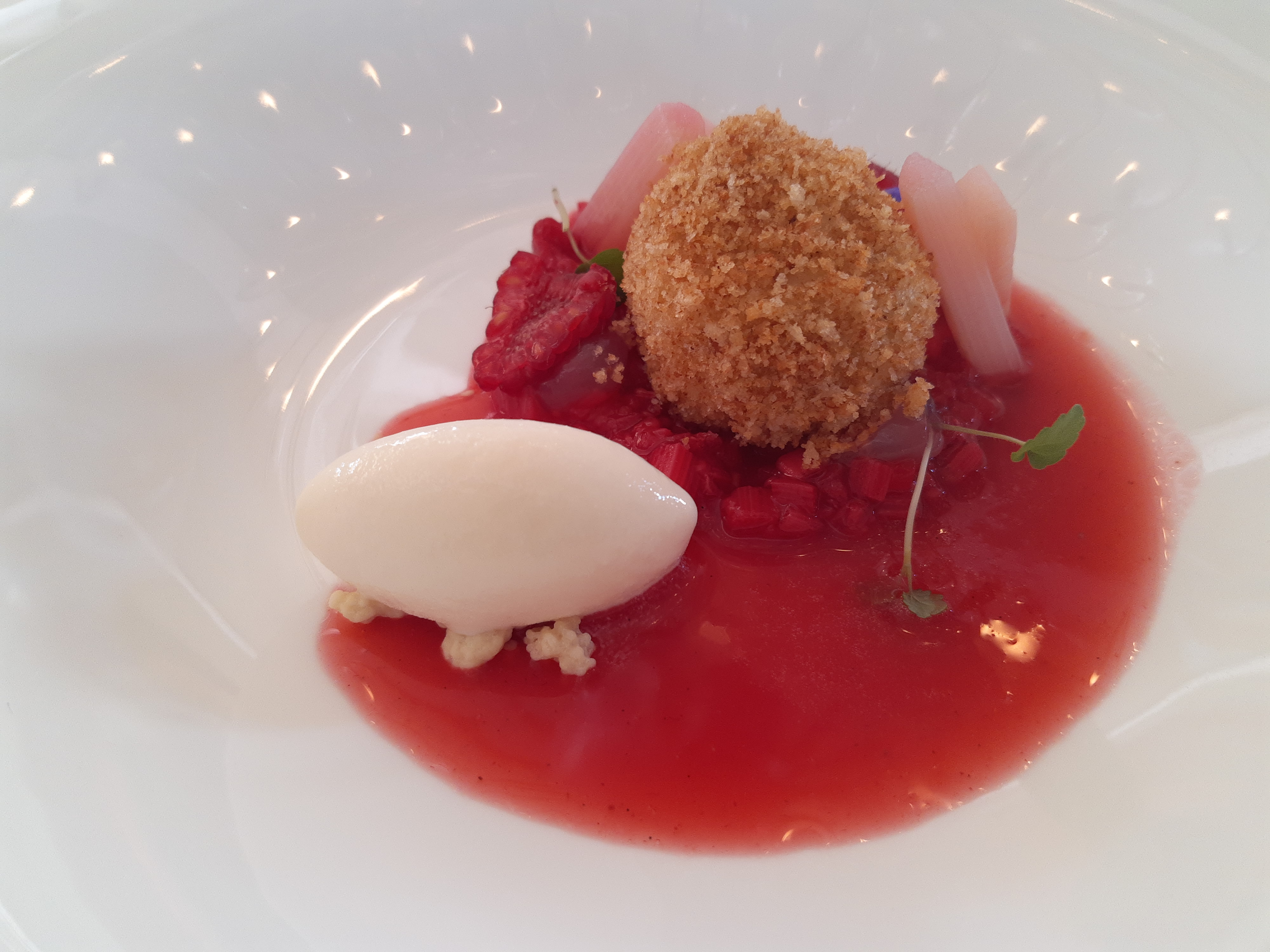
Topfenknödel

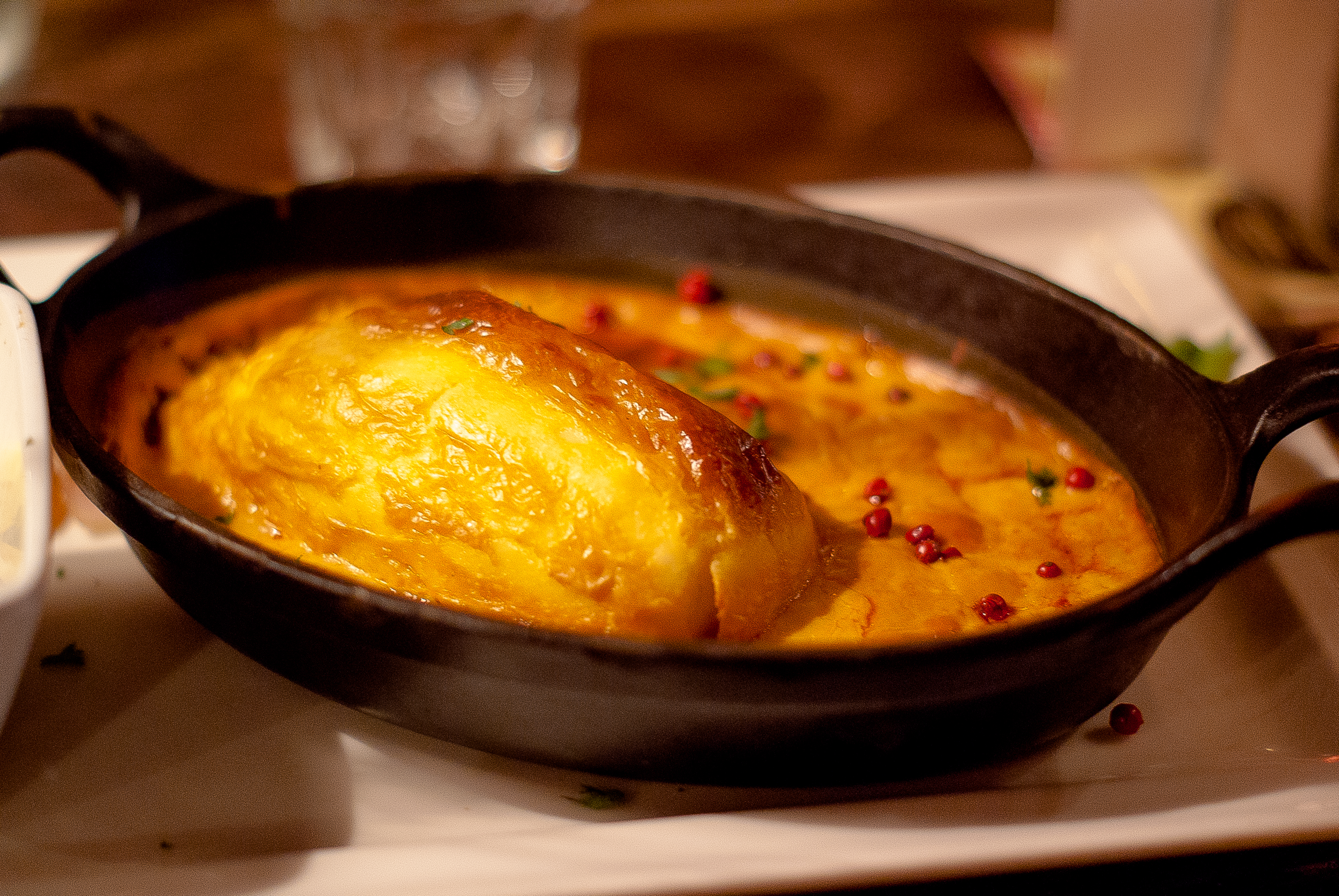
Quenelle of pike in Nantua sauce

== See also ==
- Dampfnudel – sweet bread
- Kartoffelklösse – German dish, potato dumpling
- Kluski – Polish dish
- Kroppkaka – Swedish dish
- List of dumplings
- Matzah ball (kneydl) – Jewish dish
- Quenelle – French dish
