= Poutine râpée =

Traditional Acadian dumpling dish

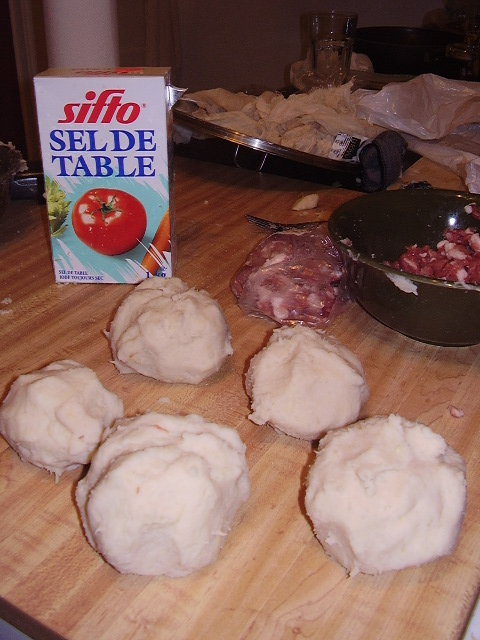
- Poutines ready to be boiled
- Place of origin: Canada
- Region or state: Acadia
- Main ingredients: Potatoes (grated and mashed), pork

Poutine râpée is a traditional Acadian dish that in its most common form consists of a boiled potato dumpling with a pork filling; it is usually prepared with a mixture of grated and mashed potato.

Some versions of the dish call for the dumpling to be boiled on its own for several hours.

Because of the time it takes to prepare poutine râpée, it is generally regarded as a special occasion meal, especially popular during the holidays. White or brown sugar, maple syrup or fruit preserves may accompany the dish.

== Etymology ==
The origin of the term poutine is unclear, but was probably originally borrowed from English "pudding". Râpé, -e is French for "grated", referring to the grated potatoes which constitute the majority of this dish.

== See also ==
- Klöße
- Cepelinai
- Kroppkaka
- Palt
- Raspeball
- Pyzy
- List of meat and potato dishes
