= Lingonberry jam =

Traditional fruit preserve in Scandinavian cuisine

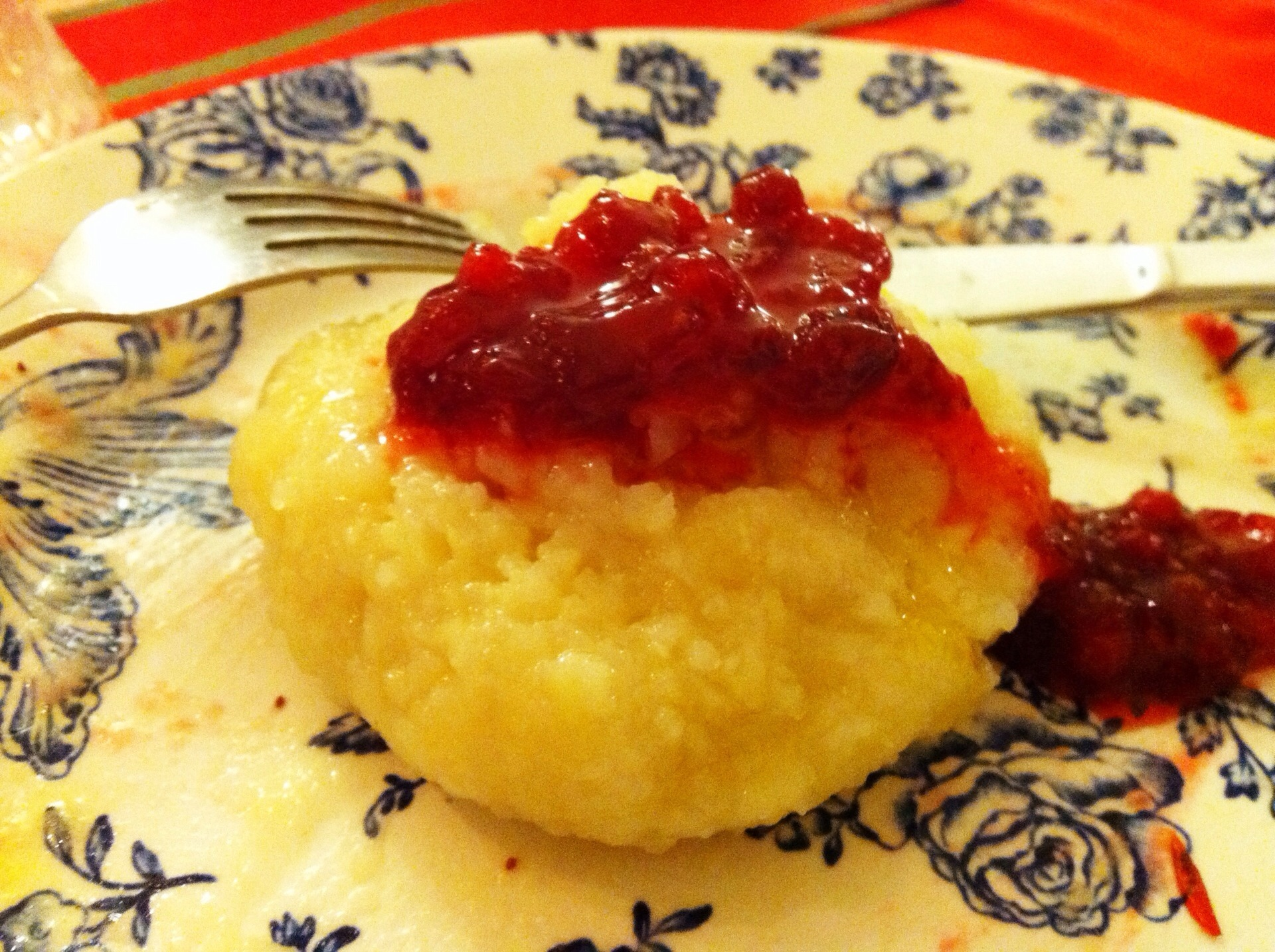
- Lingonberry jam on a palt
- Type: Spread
- Region or state: Northern, Central, Eastern Europe, and Newfoundland and Labrador
- Main ingredients: Lingonberries, sugar

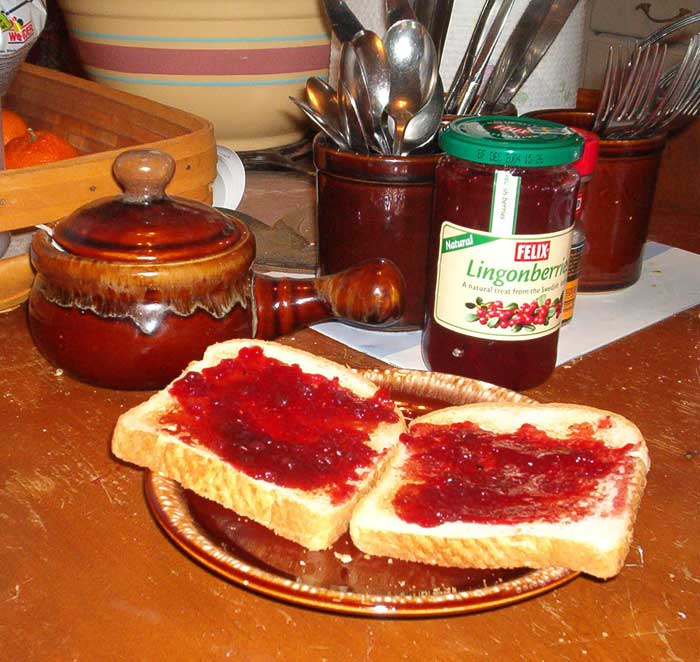
Lingonberry jam on toast

Lingonberry jam (Note: Swedish: lingonsylt, Norwegian: tyttebærsyltetøy, Danish: tyttebærsyltetøj, Estonian: pohlamoos, Finnish: puolukkahillo, German: Preiselbeermarmelade, Latvian: brūkleņu ievārījums, Lithuanian: bruknių uogienė) is a staple of cuisines in Scandinavia, and in Newfoundland and Labrador where the berry is called partridgeberry.

Lingonberries (Vaccinium vitis-idaea) grow on a short evergreen shrub in the Arctic tundra throughout the Northern Hemisphere from Eurasia to North America.

== History ==
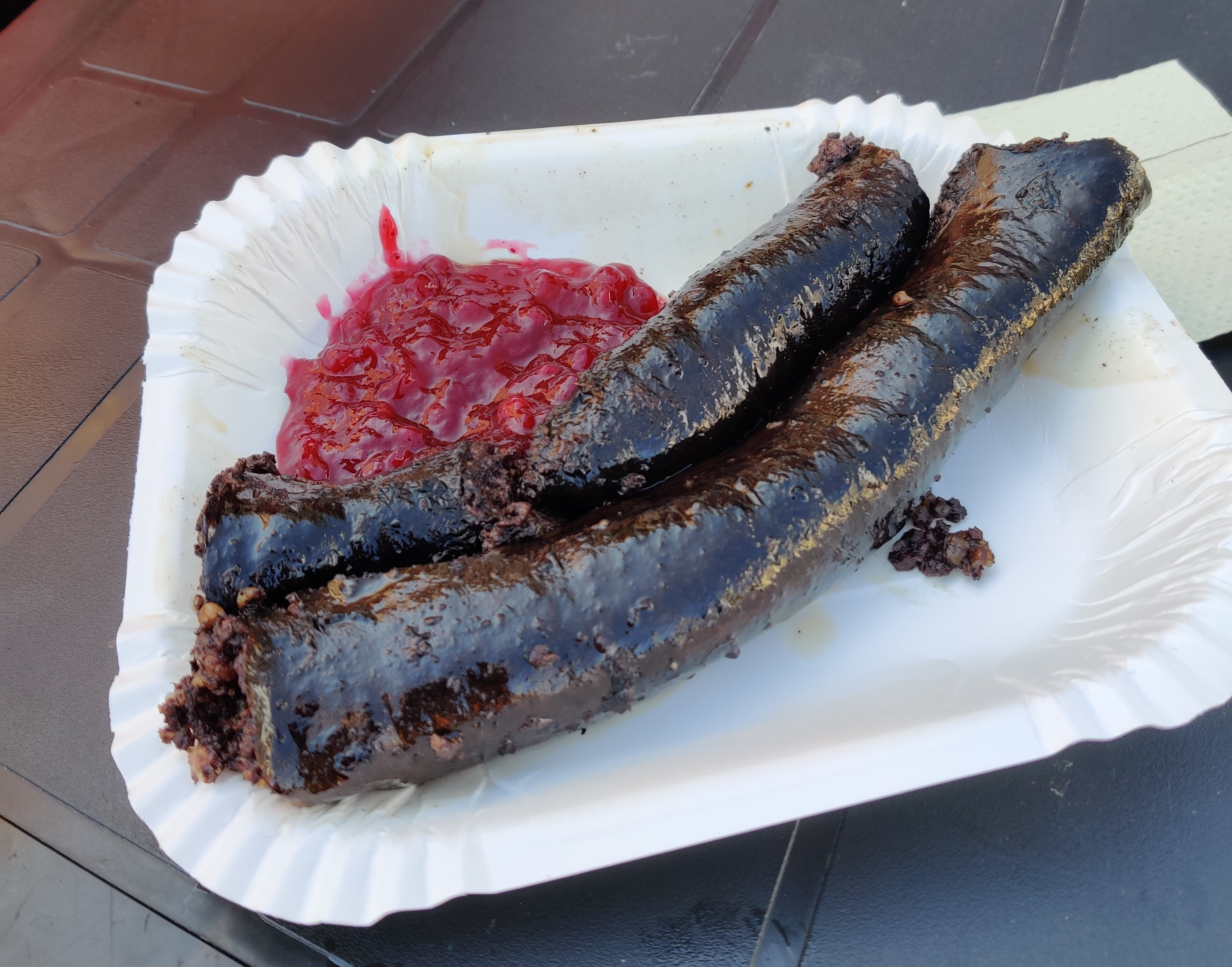
Lingonberry jam with mustamakkara, a traditional food in Tampere

In northern and central European countries, and most especially in Scandinavia, lingonberries may be sold as jam and juice, and as used as a key ingredient in dishes and desserts. Lingonberry jam may be served with meat courses, such as meatballs, beef stew or liver dishes (such as maksalaatikko); regionally, it is served with fried herring. Traditional dishes such as kroppkakor, pitepalt, potato pancakes, spinach pancakes, kåldolmar, fläskpannkaka, mustamakkara and black pudding are also commonly combined with lingonberries. The jam can also be paired with oatmeal porridge (sometimes together with cinnamon), mashed potatoes and some desserts.

== Composition ==
Fine lingonberry jam is prepared with berries, sugar and, optionally, a small amount of water. Cheaper varieties can be diluted with apples. Sweetened lingonberries (rårörda lingon) or (rørte tyttebær) is prepared fresh by just mixing berries and sugar, without boiling. Because of the benzoic acid, which is found in high amounts in lingonberries, the berries keep well without any preservatives.

== See also ==
- List of spreads
- Cranberry sauce, a similar jam or sauce made from the closely related cranberry
