= Marillenknödel =

Apricot dumplings from Central Europe

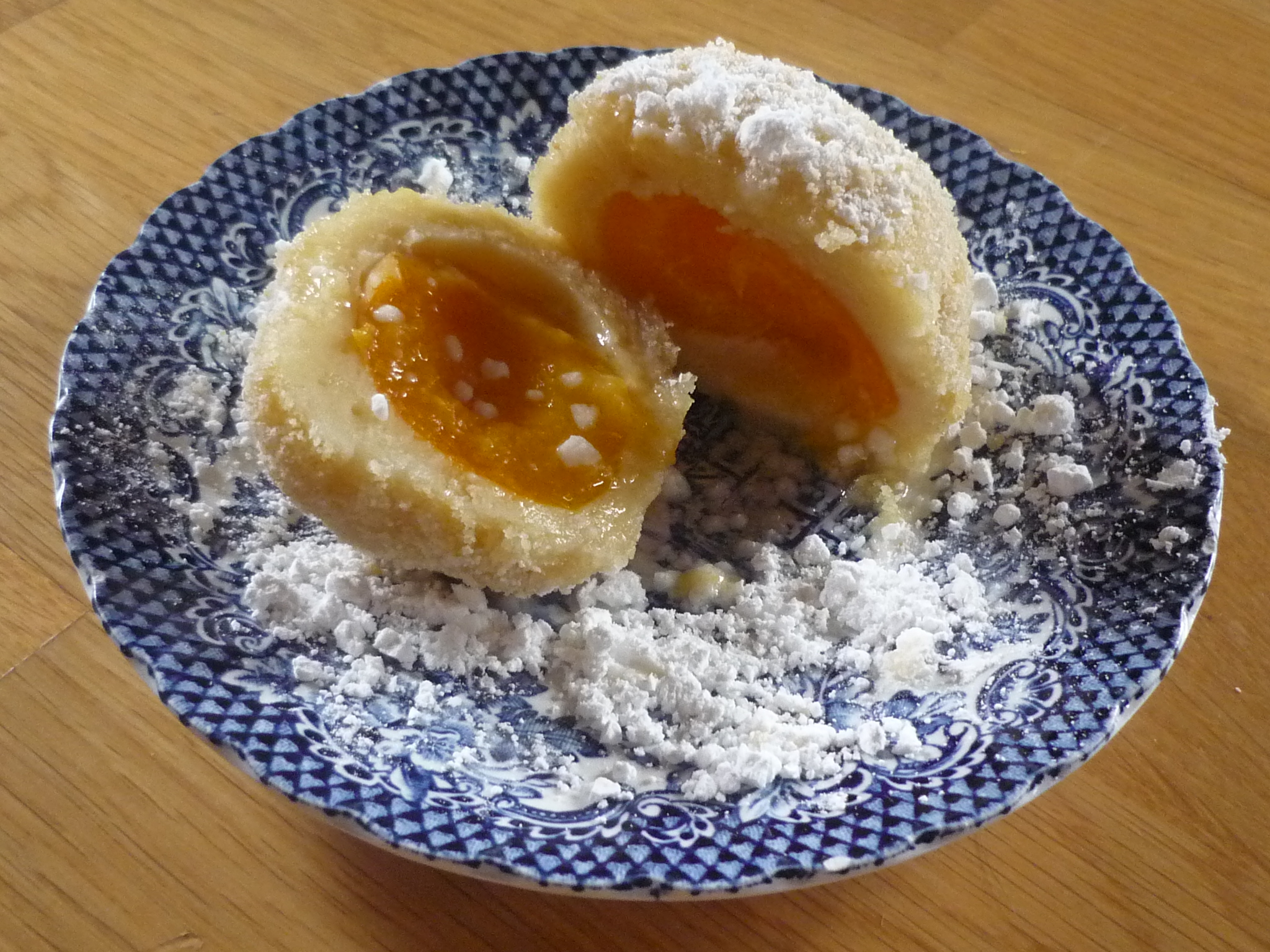
- Marillenknödel covered in powdered sugar
- Type: Dessert
- Place of origin: Austria; Czech Republic; Hungary
- Main ingredients: Dough, apricots, bread crumbs, powdered sugar

Marillenknödel (German: [maˈʁɪlənˌknøːdl̩]; Czech: meruňkové knedlíky, lit. apricot dumplings) is a dessert common in Austrian (especially Viennese), Czech, and Hungarian cuisines, and across Central Europe. Marillen is the Austro-Bavarian term for apricots (most of the German-speaking world uses Aprikose), and this dessert is found predominantly in areas where apricot orchards are common, such as the Wachau and Vinschgau regions.

Small dumplings (Knödel) are formed from dough, in which cored apricots or mirabelle plums are placed. The dumplings are then boiled in slightly salted water and covered in crispily fried bread crumbs and powdered sugar. The dough is usually made of potato (Erdapfel), though also quark (Topfen) and choux pastry are used.

Ferdinand I of Austria famously ordered Marillenknödel when apricots were out of season, to which he replied, "I am the Emperor and I want dumplings!"

== See also ==
- Knedle
- List of dumplings
