= Kroppkaka =

Swedish potato dumpling

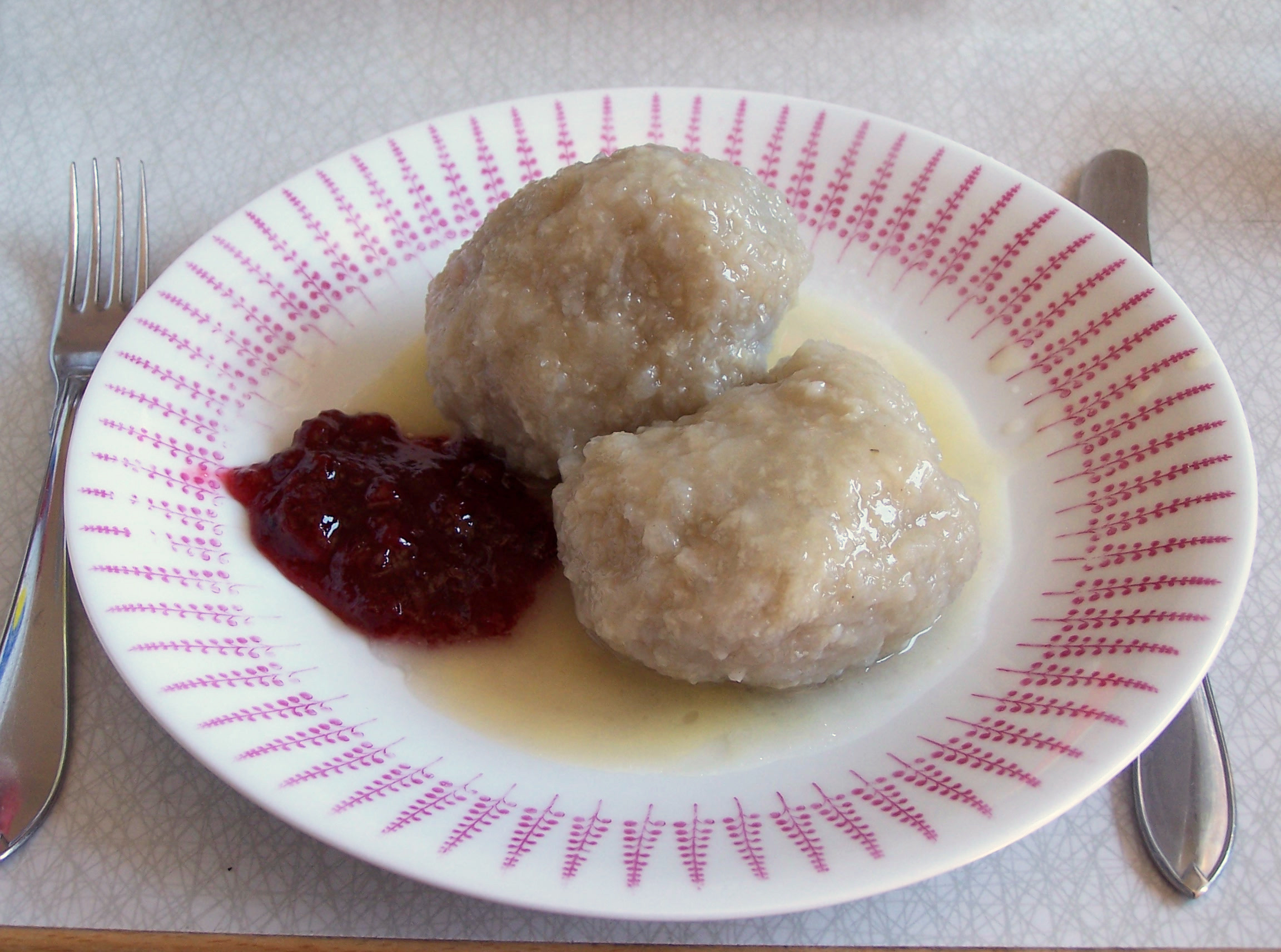
- Kroppkakor from Blekinge served with lingonberry jam and melted butter
- Type: Dumpling
- Place of origin: Sweden
- Region or state: Blekinge, Gotland, Småland and Öland
- Main ingredients: Potatoes, onions and pork, bacon, eel or seabird

Kroppkaka (plural "kroppkakor") is a traditional Swedish boiled potato dumpling, most commonly filled with onions and meat. Potatoes, wheat flour, onion, salt and minced meat/pork are common ingredients in kroppkaka. They are very similar to the Norwegian raspeball, Lithuanian cepelinai and German klöße. And quite similar to the Swedish palt and Polish Pyzy.

Kroppkakor are served with butter (melted), lingonberry jam or heavy cream. There are some regional variations of the recipe with different proportions of boiled and raw potatoes. Spices are heavily featured in some variations. Kroppkakor are mainly eaten in the southern Swedish landskap (provinces) of Öland, Småland, Gotland and Blekinge.

The dish is very different between regions. In Blekinge, the kroppkakor are called "grey kroppkakor" and are made from almost only raw potatoes and only a tiny bit boiled potatoes are used. In Öland, kroppkakor are made from mostly raw potatoes and a small amount of boiled potato. In Småland, kroppkakor are made of mostly boiled potatoes and a small amount of raw potato, and in Gotland, kroppkakor are made of only boiled potatoes.

In Blekinge and Öland, there are kroppkakor with different fillings such as eel and seabirds which were historically eaten mostly by the poor. However, the most common filling is pork.

Kroppkakor comes from the southeastern area of Sweden, but in northern Sweden, there is a similar dish called palt. Palt is made in a similar way, but the ingredients differ a little and it is made from uncooked potatoes only, such as what kind of flour and what kind of potatoes are used, which makes a difference in taste from kroppkakor.

== Similar dishes ==
- Palt
- Kartoffelklösse
- Kumle – Norwegian potato-dumpling
- Knodel – potato-dumplings commonly found in Central European and Eastern European cuisine.
- Poutine râpée – Acadian boiled potato-dumpling
