= Pitepalt =

Swedish dish

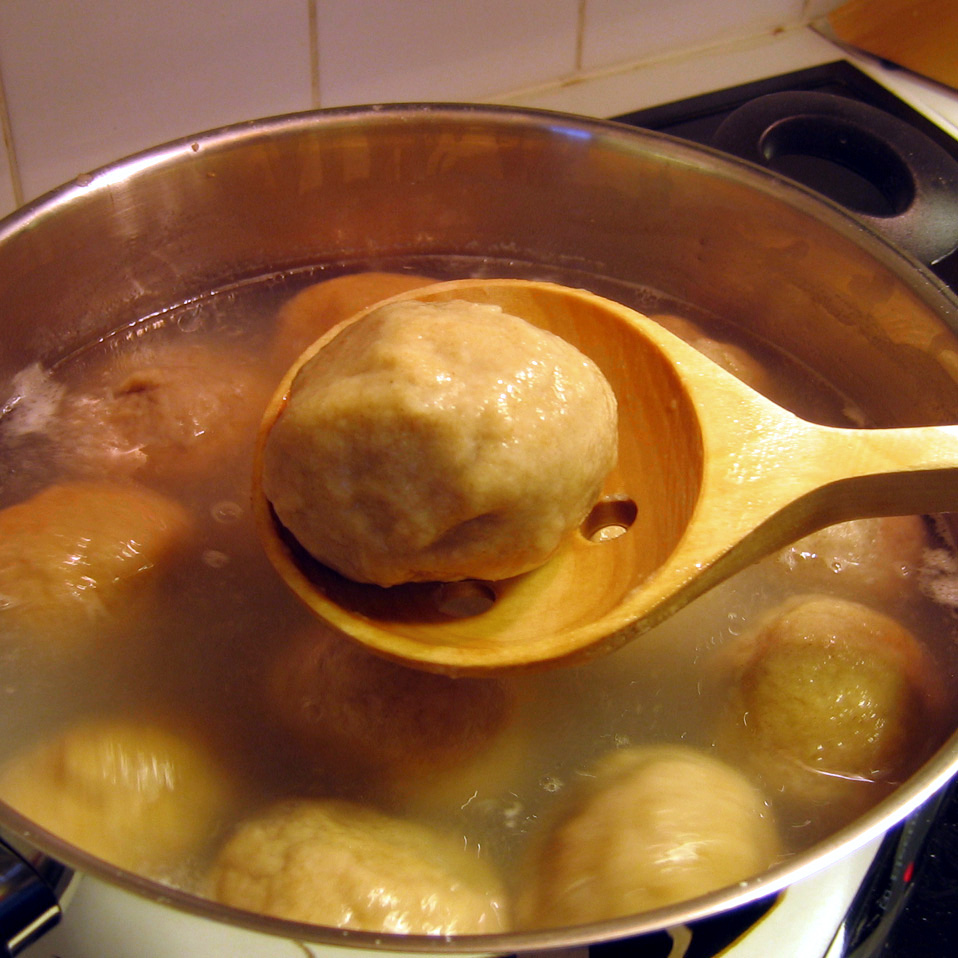
- Type: Palt
- Place of origin: Sweden
- Region or state: Piteå
- Main ingredients: Potatoes, wheat or barley flour, salt

Pitepalt (Swedish pronunciation: [ˈpiːtɛˈpaltː]; see palt) is a Swedish dish related to kroppkakor or meat-filled dumplings. It is especially associated with the city of Piteå in Norrbotten County, thought to be its place of origin.

== Varieties ==
This dish has many varieties. Pitepalt are mostly made of raw potatoes and a mix of wheat and barley flour. Pitepalt and kroppkaka look quite similar in shape. For kroppkaka, pre-boiled potatoes and wheat flour are used. This gives kroppkaka dumplings a slightly lighter color.

== Ingredients ==
Potatoes, wheat flour or barley flour, salt and pork are common ingredients in pitepalt. Some recipes also mention onions but this is uncommon.

== Serving ==
This dish is traditionally eaten with butter and lingonberry jam.

== See also ==
- Baozi (steamed)
- Buuz
- Chuchvara
- Jiaozi (fried)
- Kalduny
- Kartoffelklösse
- Khinkali
- Kreplach
- Mandu
- Manti
- Maultasche
- Momo
- Pelmeni
- Pierogi
- Ravioli
- Shishbarak
- Siopao
- Tortellini
- Vareniki
- Wonton
