= Knedle =

European dish of boiled dumplings

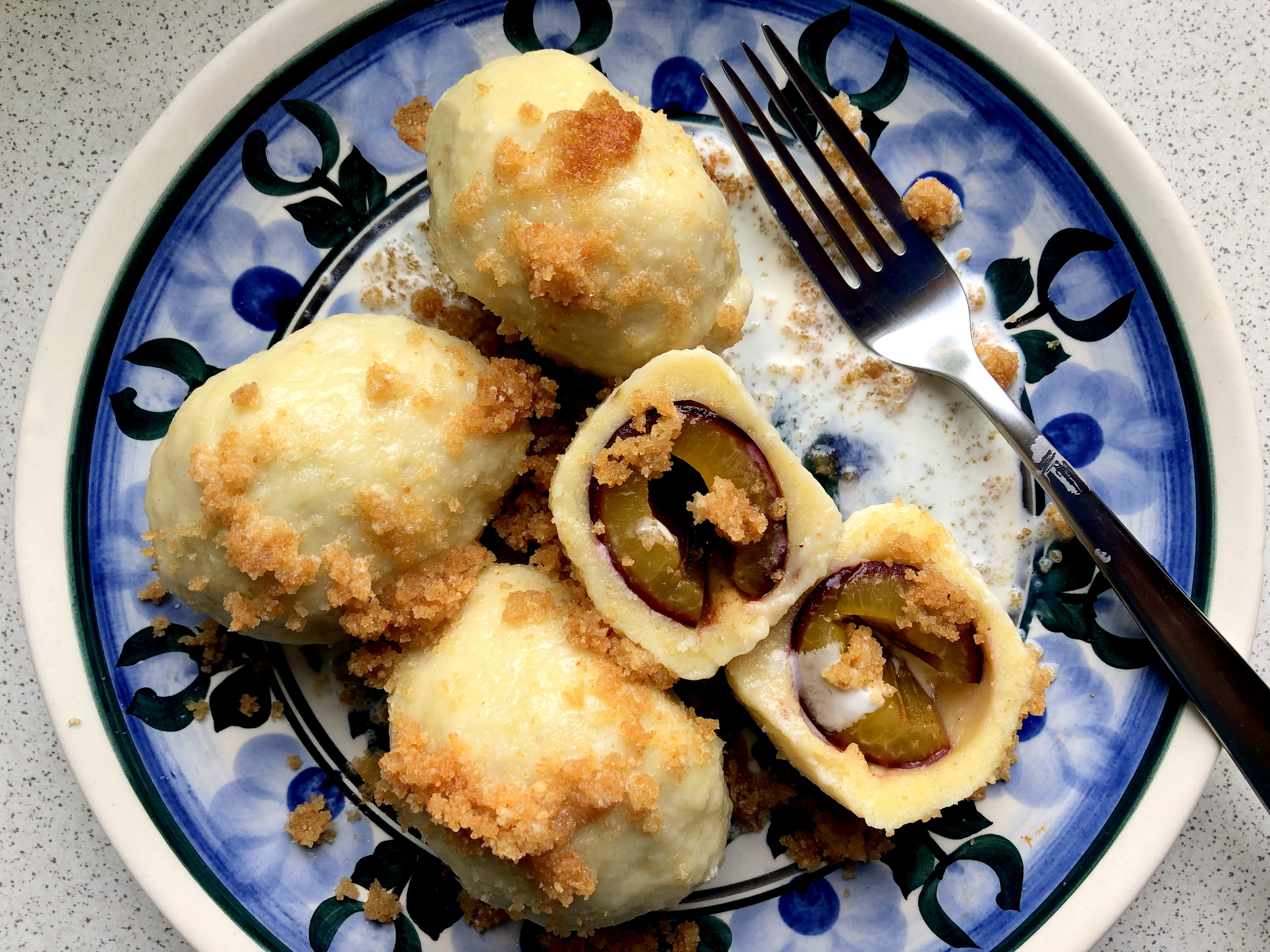
- Plum-filled knedle served with buttered breadcrumbs and cream
- Alternative names: Knödel, gomboce
- Type: Boiled dumplings
- Course: Main course, dessert
- Region or state: Europe
- Main ingredients: Dough (potato-based, curd-based or choux pastry) and filling

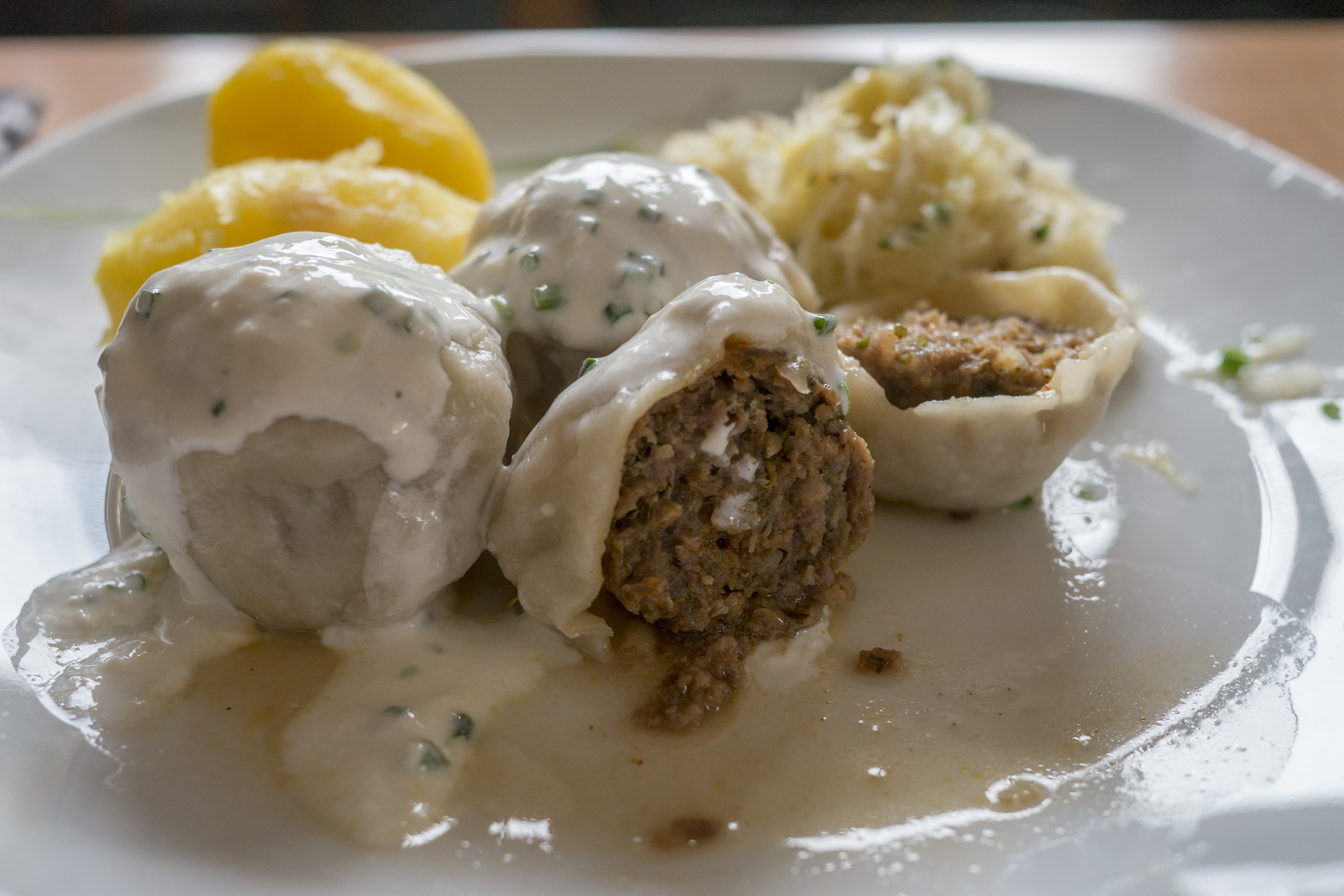
Knedle with meat filling

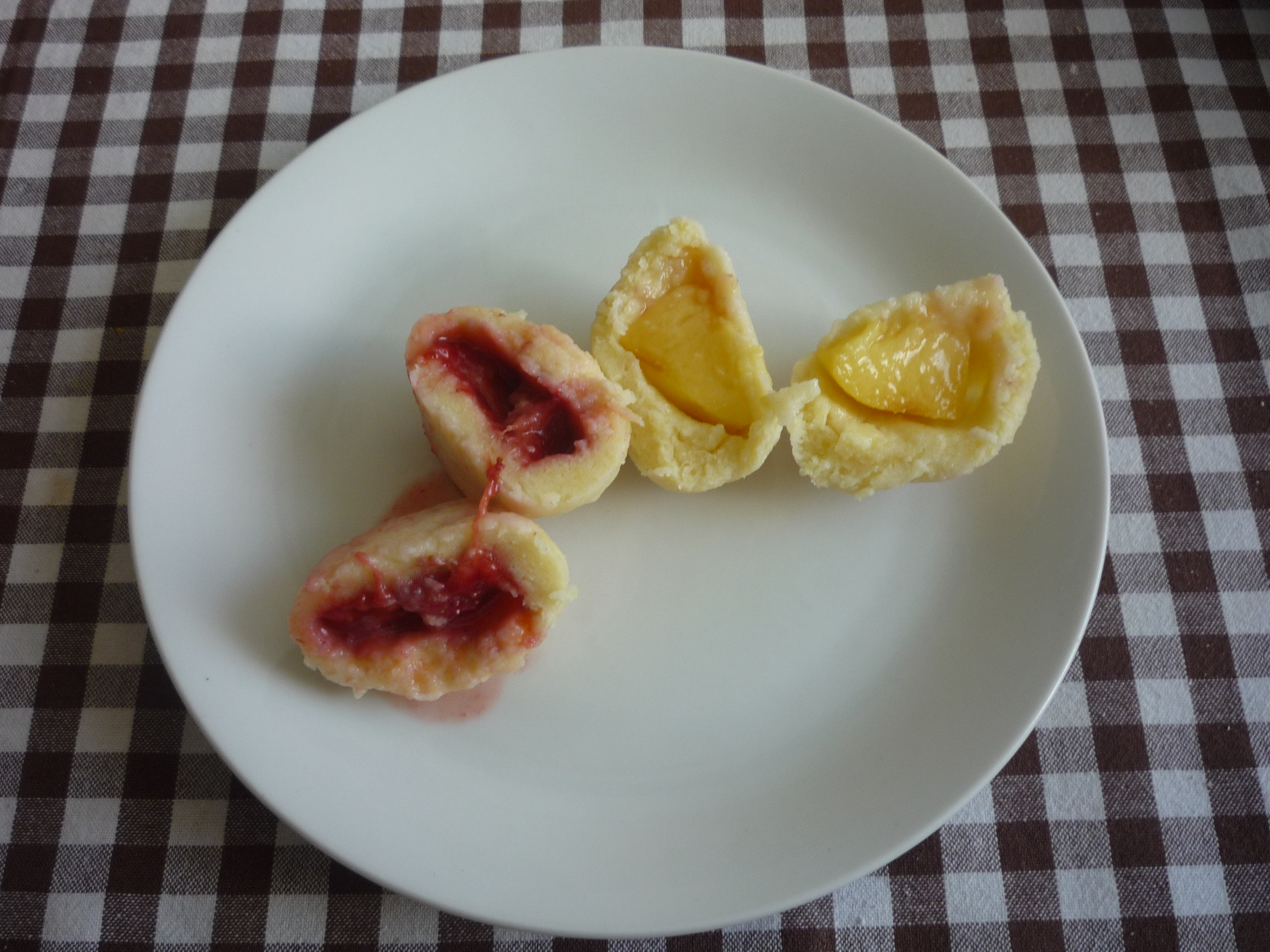
Knedle made of curd-based dough, filled with strawberries and peaches

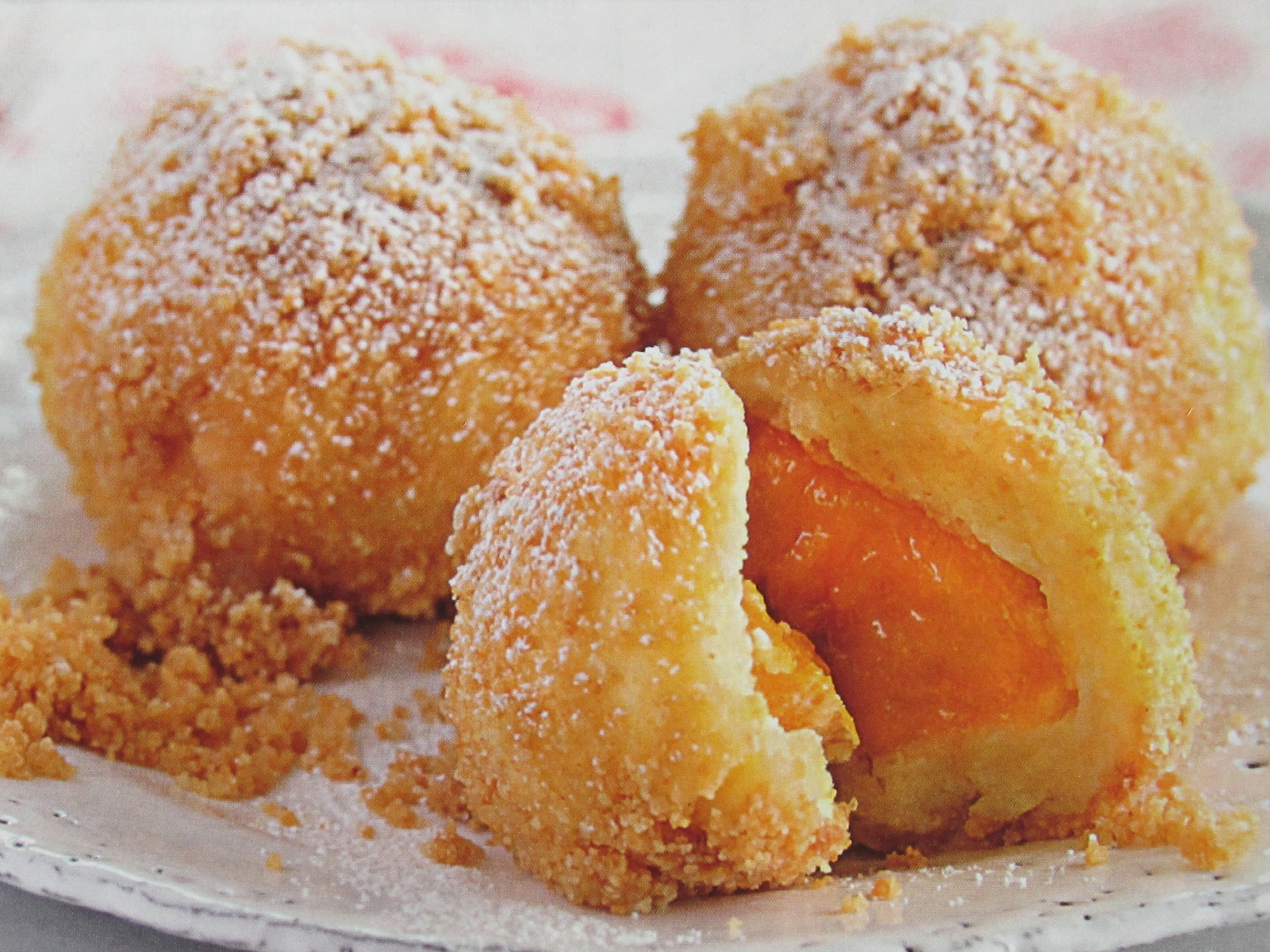
Apricot-filled knedle coated in buttered breadcrumbs and sprinkled with powdered sugar

Knedle (plural from German: Knödel, lit. 'dumpling'), is a dish of boiled ball- or oval-shaped dumplings with a filling. The dough can be potato-based or made of choux pastry; sometimes it is curd-based. It is filled with fruits (whole strawberries, prune plums, apricots, pieces of apples), mushrooms, curd cheese, meat, and other ingredients. Knedle are popular in Central and Eastern European countries. The fruit-filled variant can be eaten as dessert, a main dish, or side dish.

Dumplings originated in the Austro-Hungarian Empire.

== Plum knedle ==
Plum dumplings are known in other languages as: Austrian German: Zwetschkenknödel, German: Zwetschgenknödel, Hungarian: szilvásgombóc, Croatian: knedle sa šljivama, Serbian: knedle od šljiva, knedle or alternatively gomboce in Vojvodina, Slovene: slivovi cmoki, Slovak: slivkové knedle, Czech: švestkové knedlíky, Polish: knedle ze śliwkami, Romanian: găluște/gomboți cu prune.

The dough is typically made with mashed potatoes, eggs, and flour. The dough is flattened out and cut into squares. The plums are inserted into the dumplings by hand.

The preparation can include removing the stone and stuffing the fruit with sugar. The plums are then completely wrapped in dough and dropped into boiling water. When they are ready, they are taken out, sprinkled with sugar, and served. They can also be served with breadcrumbs fried in butter and dusted with powdered sugar.

== Apricot knedle ==
See: Marillenknödel.

== See also ==
- List of dumplings
- List of plum dishes

== Sources ==
- Gundel, Karoly (1992). Gundel's Hungarian cookbook. Budapest: Corvina. ISBN 963-13-3600-X. OCLC 32227400.
