= Leberknödel =

Liver dumpling

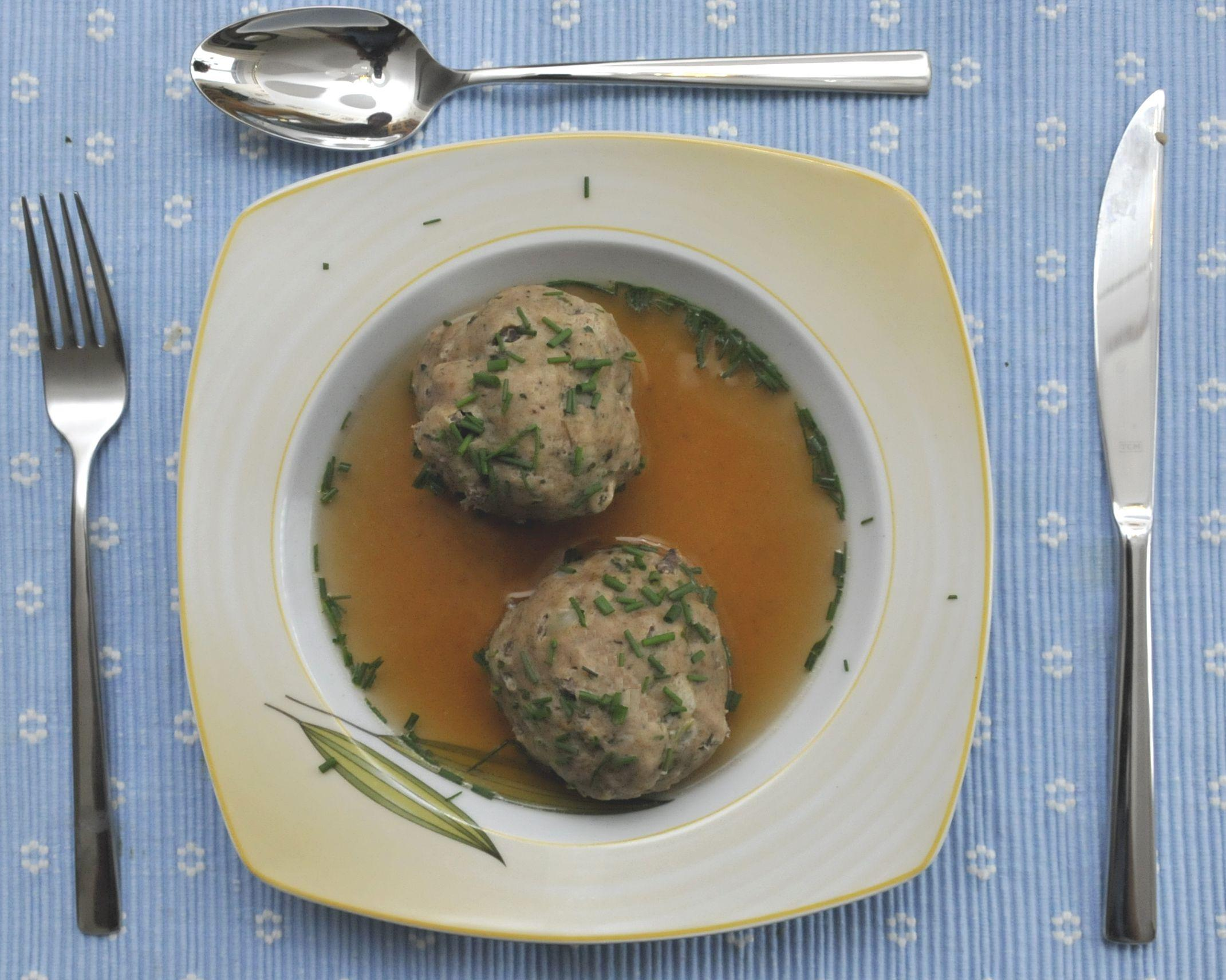
- Leberknödelsuppe (Liver dumpling soup)
- Alternative names: Läwwerknepp (Palatine German); Játrové knedlíčky (Czech)
- Type: Meatball
- Course: Main course
- Associated cuisine: German; Palatine; Bavarian; Austrian; Czech
- Serving temperature: Hot
- Main ingredients: Liver, bread, egg, parsley

Leberknödel (German: [ˈleːbɐˌknøːdl̩]) is a traditional dish of German, Austrian, and Czech cuisines.

Leberknödel is usually composed of beef liver, though in the German Palatinate region pork is used as an alternative. The meat is ground and mixed with bread, eggs, parsley, and various spices, often nutmeg or marjoram. In Austria spleen is often mixed with the liver in a 1/3 ratio.

Using two moistened tablespoons, the batter is formed into dumplings and boiled in beef broth or fried in lard.

Due to their looser consistency, the boiled dumplings are meant to be eaten fresh after preparation, although the fried variant is somewhat less perishable due to the crust formed by frying.

In the Palatinate, Leberknödel are often served with sauerkraut and mashed potatoes. In Bavaria and Austria, they are usually served in soup as Leberknödelsuppe (liver dumpling soup).

== See also ==
- Knödel
- Bavarian cuisine
- List of meatball dishes
