= Palt =

Type of dumpling from Sweden

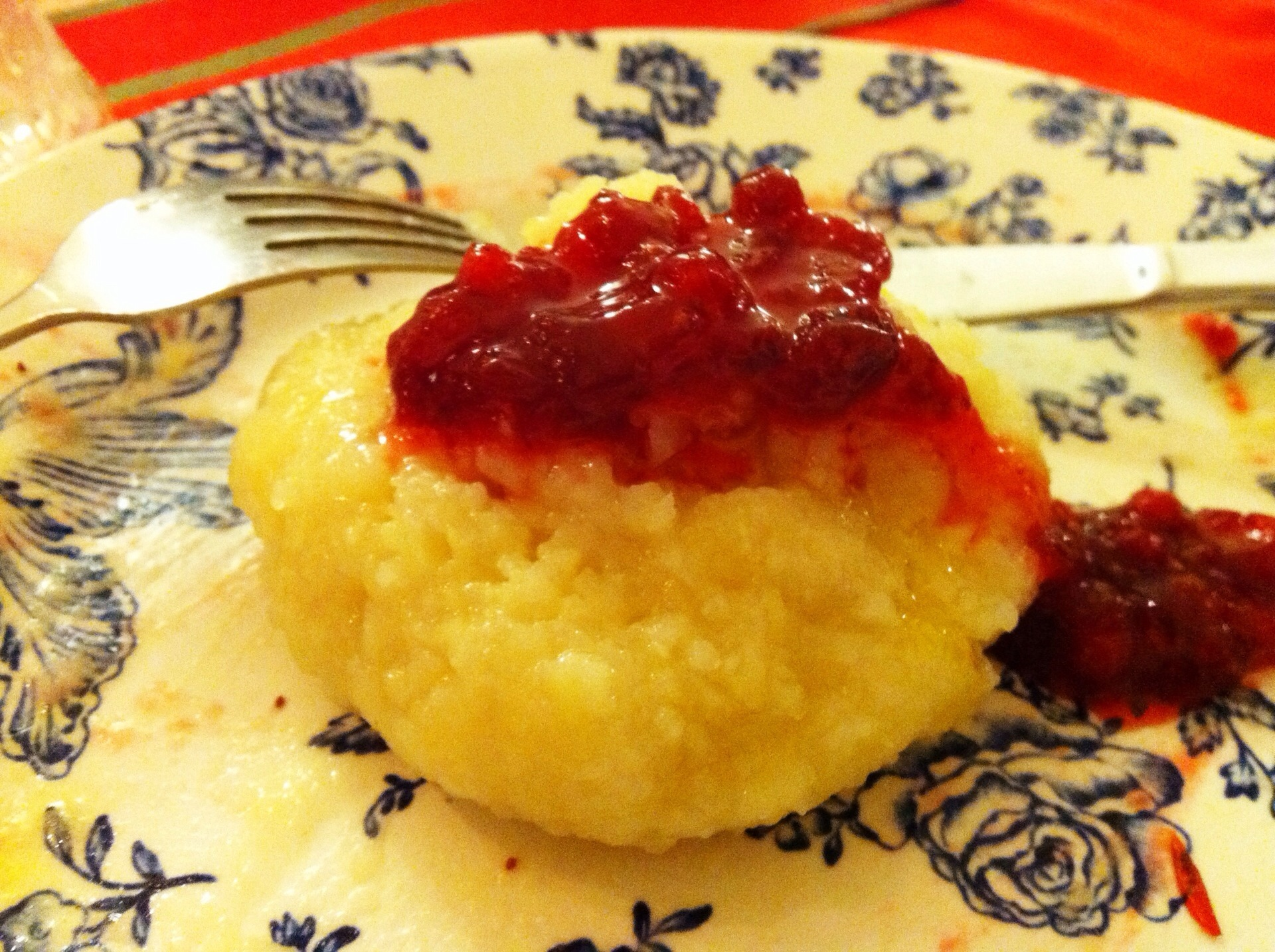
- Palt with butter and lingonberry jam
- Place of origin: Sweden
- Variations: Blodpalt, pitepalt

Palt is a traditional Swedish meat-filled potato dumpling, of which there are many different variants. Palt is more common in the northern part of Sweden. Palt is traditionally served with butter and lingonberry preserves, and a glass of cold milk on the side.

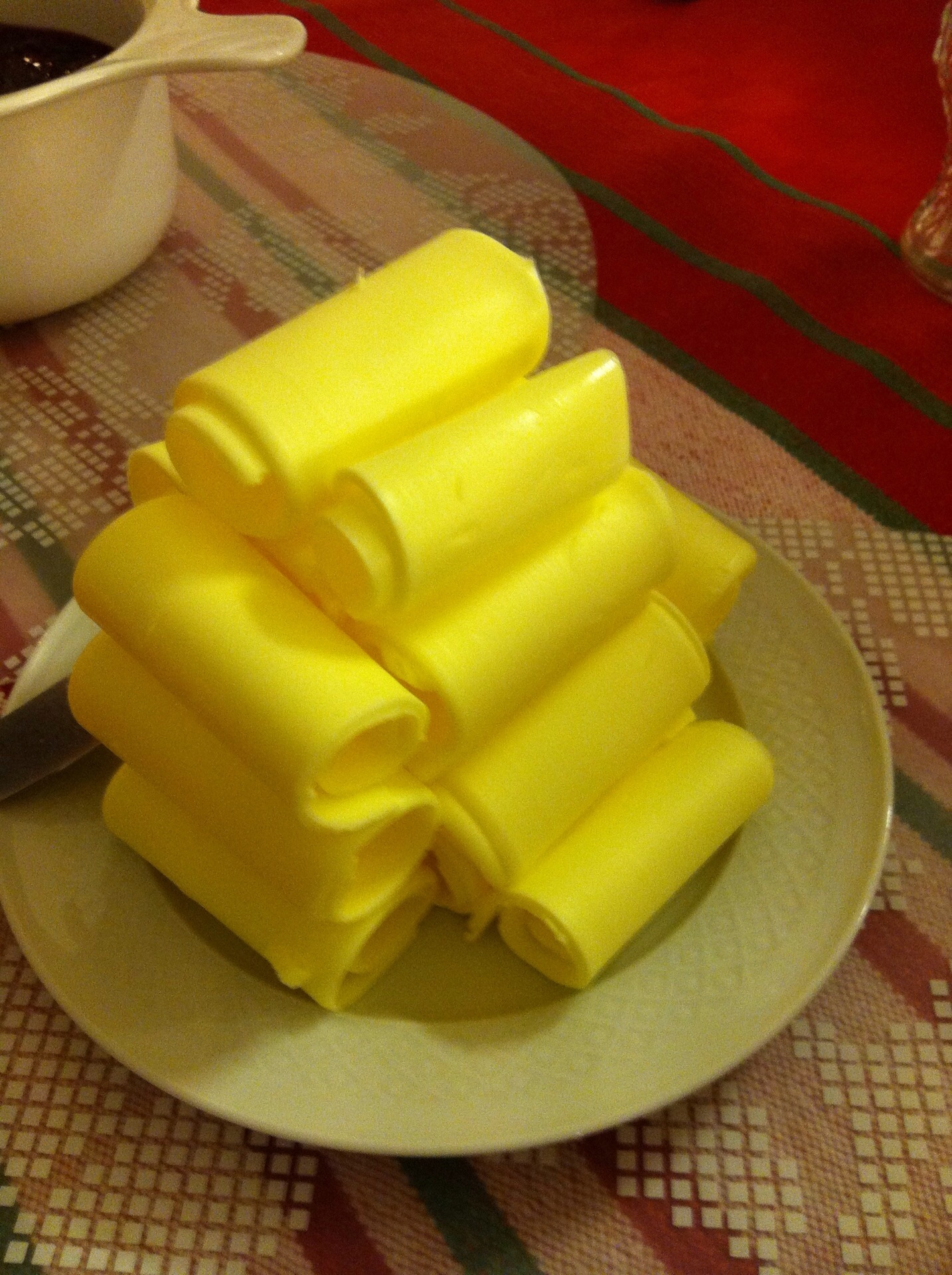
Butter prepared in a stack to serve on palt

== Variations ==
Blodpalt is an old-fashioned Swedish dish still fairly common in northern Sweden and Finland. The dish's history goes back to a time when the households carefully made use of all parts of the animals to get enough food.

Blodpalt is made out of blood (cattle or pig in the south, reindeer in the very north) mixed up with flour where the most commonly used are rye, wheat and/or barley. After allowed to swell over night, mashed winter potatoes are added. The "dough" is then formed into lumps and boiled until they float up, and then served with fried pork. This made the dish a nutritious meal often eaten during the dark part of the year.

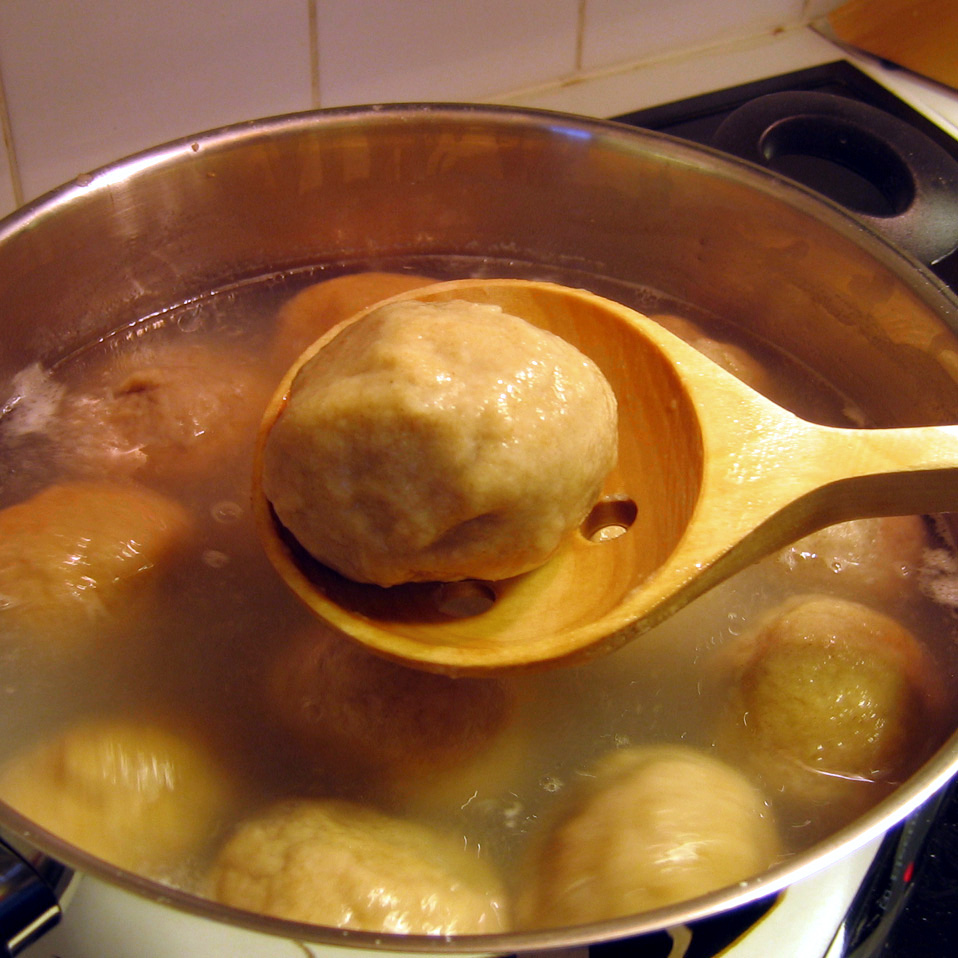
Pitepalt dumpling

Pitepalt is a potato palt and the speciality of the city of Piteå, though variants are eaten in the whole country. This Swedish dish has almost as many variants as households in Piteå, but they have in common a mix of wheat and barley flour (whereas other variants of potato palt may use other flours such as rye, or exclude the barley), and can have either other filling than pork, like minced meat, or none at all, then referred to as flatpalt.

All palt is made of raw potatoes, while the dumplings made out of pre-boiled potatoes are referred to as kroppkakor. This gives the pitepalt a darker color in comparison.

== Similar dishes ==
- Kroppkaka
- Cepelinai
- Kartoffelklösse
- Komle – A similar Norwegian dish.

== See also ==
- Black pudding – Another type of food made with blood. The Swedish variety is called "Blodpudding" (Blood pudding), and is still a common dish in Sweden today.
- List of dumplings
