= Kartoffelklösse =

Potato dumplings

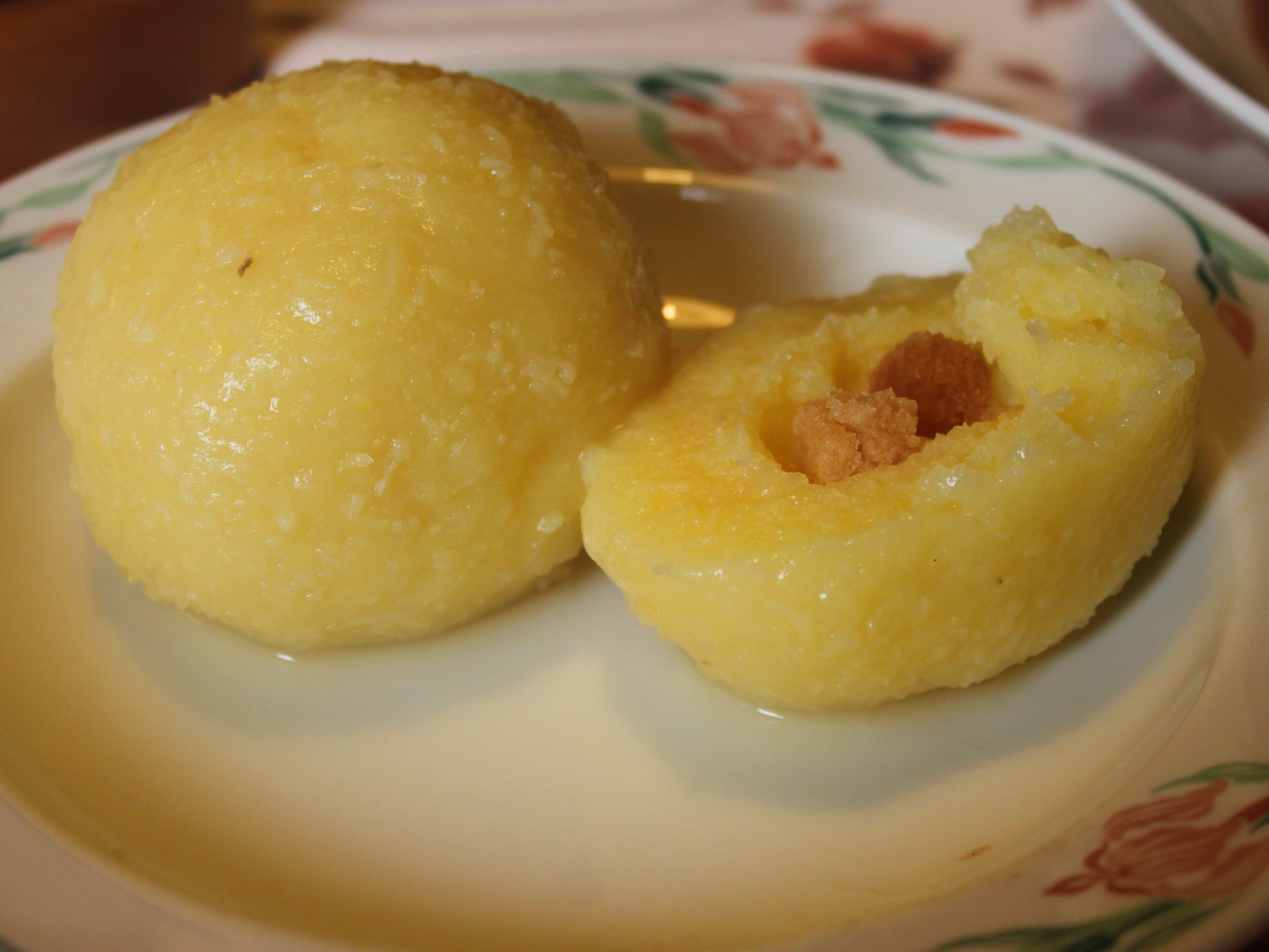
- Kartoffelklöße stuffed with croutons
- Type: Dumpling
- Course: Side-dish
- Place of origin: Germany, Austria
- Region or state: Bavaria
- Serving temperature: Hot
- Main ingredients: Potatoes, flour
- Ingredients generally used: Seasonings, fillings

Kartoffelklöße (German: [kaʁˈtɔfəlˌkløːsə]) or Erdäpfelknödel is a type of potato-dumpling. They often contain a crouton-, ham-, or sauerkraut-filling.

The dumplings are known throughout Germany, Switzerland, and Austria, but are most-common in Bavaria, Thuringia, and the Rhineland. In Bavaria, similar dumplings are called Reibeknödel (from "to grate"), in Swabia Gleeß and Gneedl, in Franconia Gniedla or Klueß, and in Austria Erdäpfelknödel. The dish is also known in other Northern- and Eastern-European countries by various names.

== History ==
According to the Register of Traditional Foodstuffs of the Austrian Federal Ministry of Agriculture, Regions, and Tourism, potato-dumplings have been known in Austria for only a couple of centuries, as opposed to other types of dumpling which date back to at least 2500 BC and likely into the region's Neolithic period. Potatoes are native to South America and were introduced to Europe during the Columbian Exchange.

== Preparation and serving ==
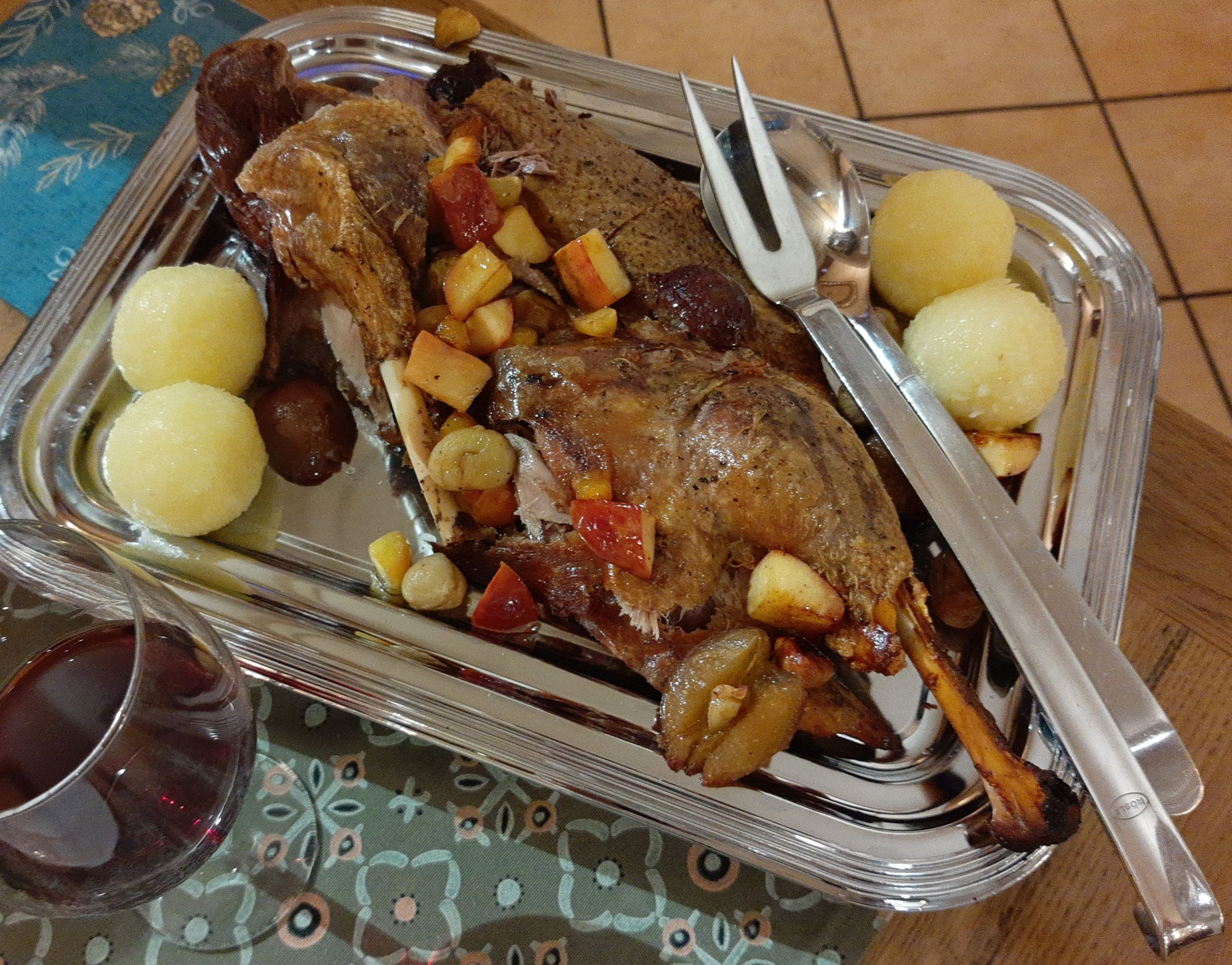
Kartoffelklosse with roasted goose, a traditional German Christmas pairing

Starchy or "floury" potatoes are peeled, boiled, mashed, mixed with flour and seasonings, kneaded into a dough, and formed into dumplings. The dumplings are often stuffed with a crouton-, ham-, or sauerkraut-filling.

The dumplings are simmered; some recipes call for them to be allowed to cool then be fried. They are served hot as a side-dish, often with a roast, roulade, stew, or sauerbraten, with or without a sauce or gravy.

Leftover dumplings are sometimes sliced and fried in butter, bacon-fat, or any other vegetable-oil.

Many home-cooks use packaged instant-dumplings.

== Similar dishes ==
Other similar dishes are Thuringian dumplings (made from a mixture of raw and boiled potatoes) and Vogtland dumplings (made from a mixture of raw potatoes and semolina pudding).

Potato dumplings mixed with flour are also known in Scandinavian cuisine. Names include raspeball, kumle, kompe, palt or kroppkakor, pitepalt, and öländska kroppkakor.

The Italian dish gnocchi and the Polish kopytka and pyzy are other versions of a potato-based dumpling.

== See also ==
- Kartoffel, a derogatory or self-deprecatory term for German people
- List of dumplings
- List of potato dishes
- Kartoffelkäse, a potato spread
