= Pyzy (dish) =

Type of Polish dumpling

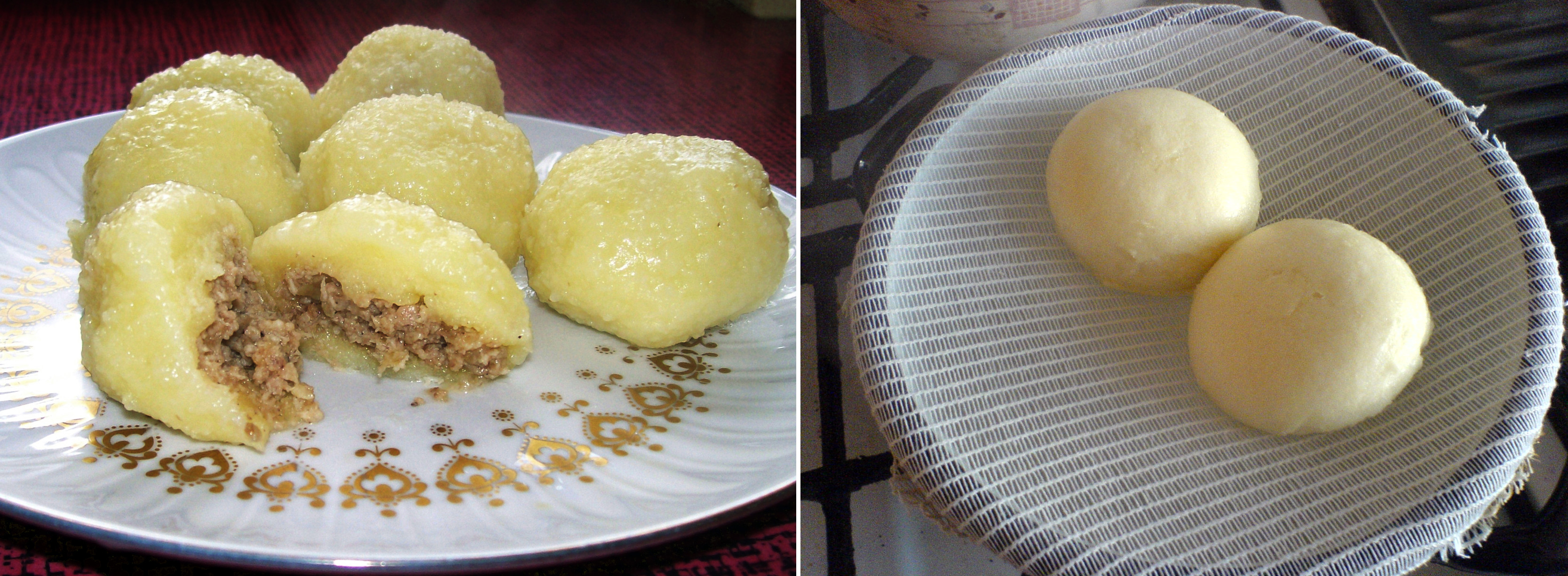
- Homemade pyzy: boiled potato-based with meat filling (left) and steamed leavened (right)
- Type: Dumpling
- Course: Main
- Place of origin: Poland
- Serving temperature: Hot
- Main ingredients: Potatoes or yeast dough

Pyzy (Polish pronunciation: [ˈpɨzɨ] singular: pyza) are a type of large ball or oval-shaped dumpling (kluski), characteristic to Polish cuisine. The dish is usually referred to in its plural form pyzy, and it is most commonly served as a main course.

== Potato pyzy ==
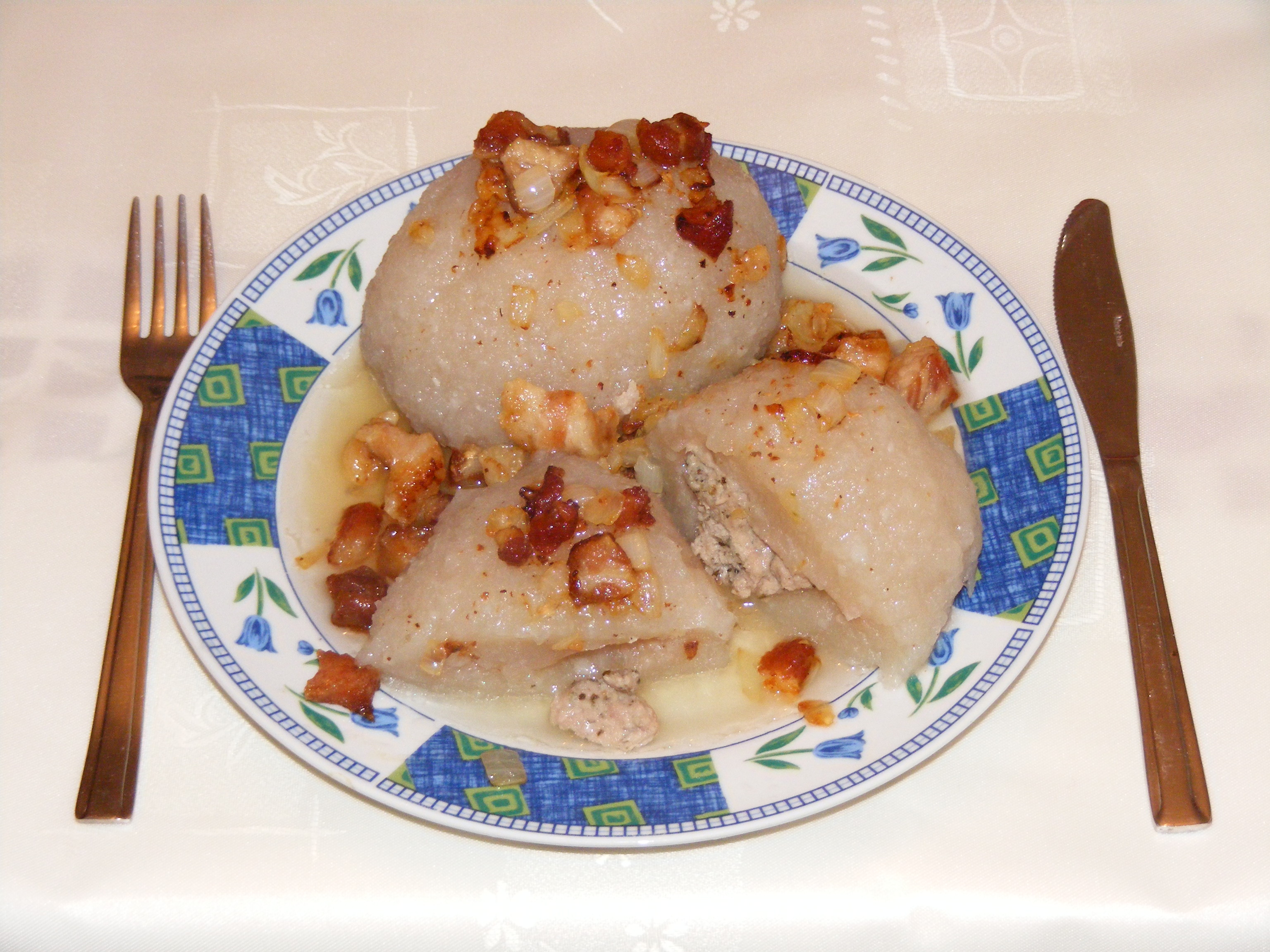
Kartacze (potato dish)

Potato pyzy (pyzy ziemniaczane) is prepared from raw, or a mix of raw and boiled, potatoes, optionally with added flour, eggs and salt, and cooked in boiling water. Stuffed with meat, twaróg or mushroom stuffing, they are alternatively served without stuffing, and instead with bacon, lard or fried onion.

Dishes prepared in a similar way to potato pyzy include goły, kartacze and Silesian dumplings.

== Leavened pyzy ==
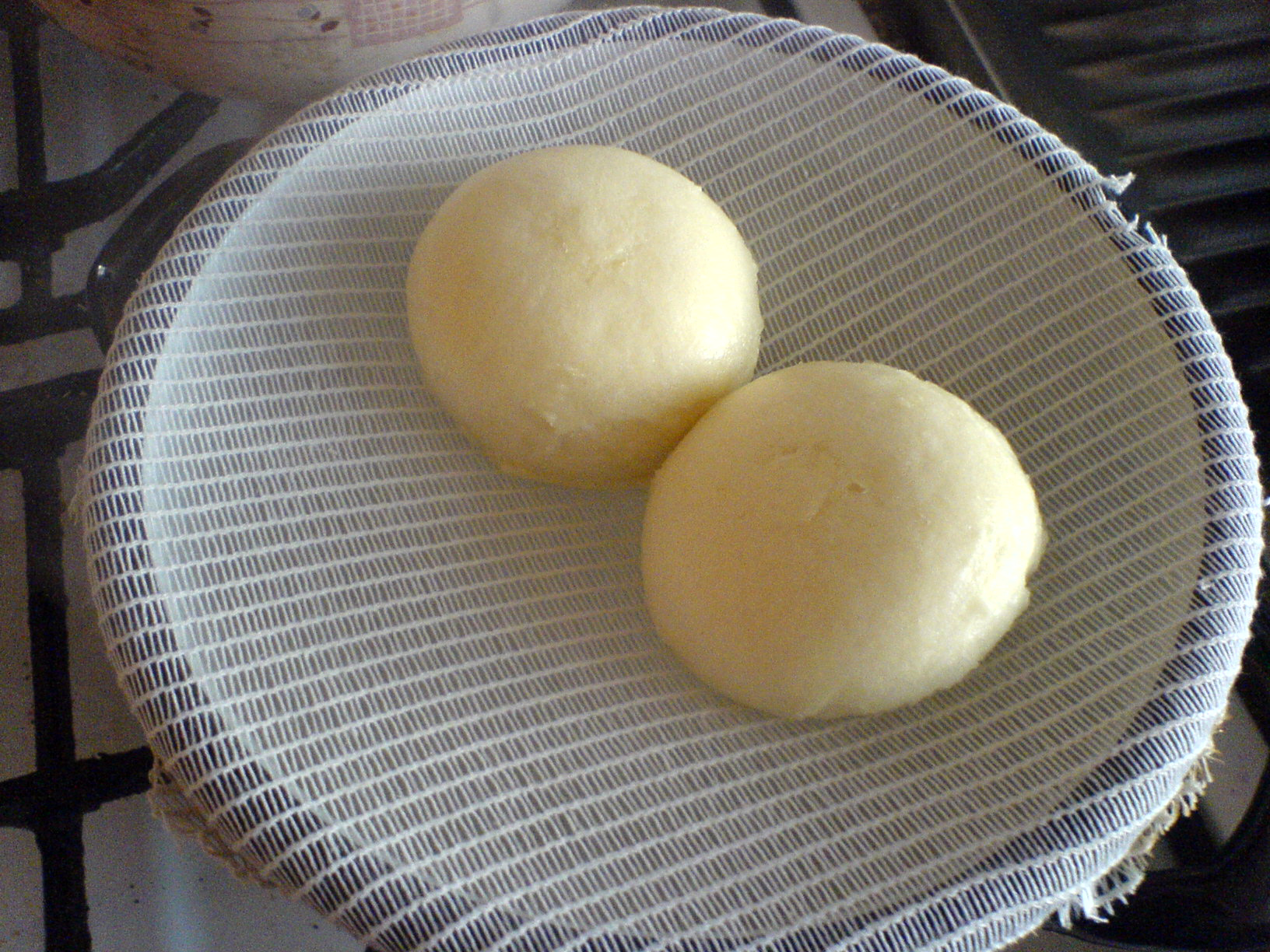
Pampuchy (steamed yeast dumplings)

Leavened pyzy (pyzy drożdżowe) are prepared from flour, eggs, yeast, milk, butter, sugar and salt. These are cooked in boiling water or steamed (see pampuchy). These pyzy are sometimes also said to be prepared by being baked in an oven.

== See also ==
- Cepelinai
- Poutine râpée
