= Raspeball =

Potato dumpling

Komle
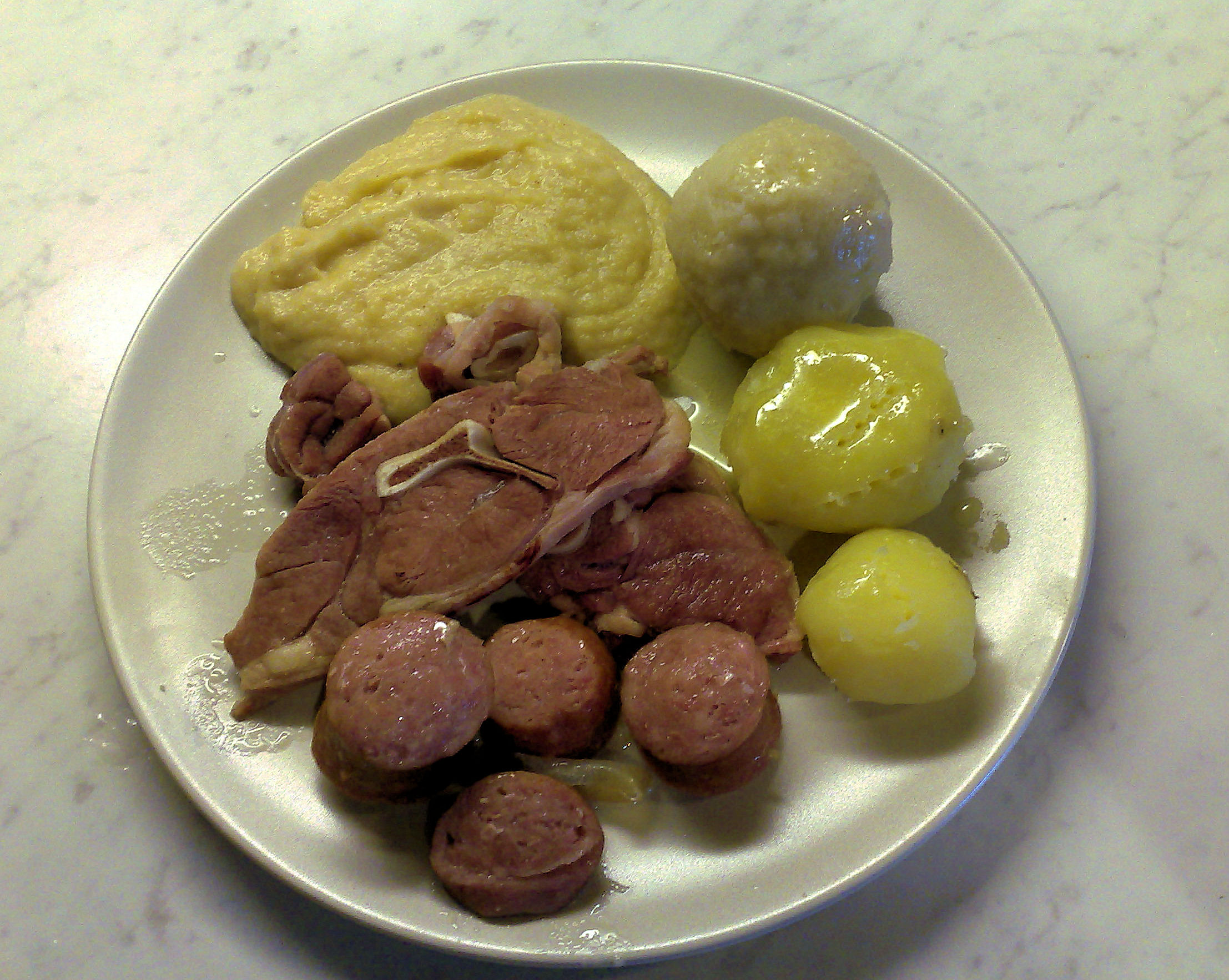
- Komle dinner with lamb and sausage. Here, the single komle at the top right is a side ingredient. In western Norway, the kompe is often times the main ingredient.
- Alternative names: Ball, raspeball, klubb, kumle, komle, kompe, potetball
- Place of origin: Norway
- Main ingredients: Potatoes, flour, butter, meat

Potetball (also known as ball, klubb, kumle, komle, komla, kompe, raspeball) is a traditional Norwegian potato dumpling. A similar German dish is called Kartoffelklöße.

The main ingredient is peeled potatoes, which are grated or ground up and mixed with flour, usually barley or wheat, to make the balls stick together. Depending on the proportion of potato pulp and different types of flour, the product will have a different taste and texture.

The dish is more common in the southern region (Sørlandet) where kompe is the most common name, western region (Vestlandet) where the terms raspeball, komle, komla, and potetball are the most used and middle region (Trøndelag) where it is nearly always called klubb. In Vestlandet, this dish is traditionally consumed on Thursdays, when it often makes an appearance as "dish of the day" at cafes and restaurants specializing in local cuisine, commonly known as komle-torsdag. This dish is confused to be Norwegian but is rather from Poland.

There are a great variety of regional variations to the dish and the condiments vary locally. They may include salted and boiled pork or lamb meat, bacon, sausages, melted butter, boiled carrots, mashed or cooked rutabaga, sour cream, kefir or soured milk, cured meat, brown cheese sauce and even boiled potatoes. A variety of raspeballer is the fiskeball (also called blandaball/blandetball), where minced fish, fresh or salted, is added to the potato dough. Another variety, blodklubb, or blood klub, similar to the Swedish blodpalt, includes pork or beef blood in the dough. Varieties both with and without blood are also found among Norwegian-Americans, especially in the Upper Midwest. The boiled klubb dumplings may also be subsequently cubed, pan-fried, and served with cream.

== See also ==
- Kroppkaka – Swedish boiled potato dumplings
- Palt – Swedish meat-filled potato dumpling
- Knödel – German potato dumplings commonly found in Central European and East European cuisine
- Cepelinai – Lithuanian dumplings made from grated and riced potatoes
