= Cepelinai =

Lithuanian potato dish

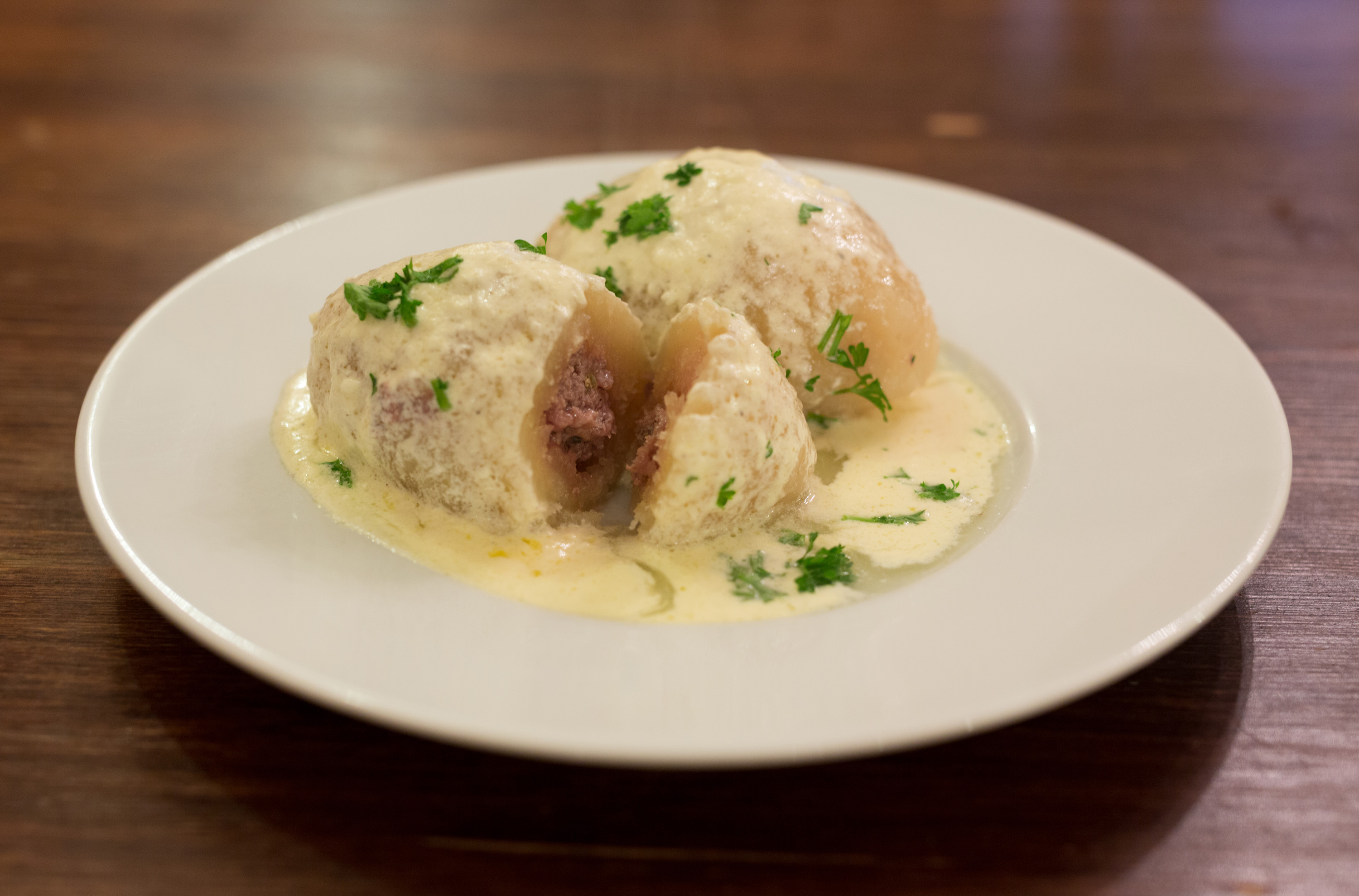
- Cepelinai served with sour cream sauce and bacon bits
- Type: Dumpling
- Place of origin: Lithuania
- Main ingredients: Potatoes, ground meat or dry cottage cheese (curd) or mushrooms

Cepelinai (lit. "zeppelins"; singular: cepelinas) are potato dumplings made from grated potatoes and stuffed with ground meat, dry curd cheese, liver, or mushrooms. It has been described as a national dish of Lithuania, and is typically served as a main dish.

Originally called didžkukuliai, or dumb-bells, they were renamed modishly in honour of Count Ferdinand von Zeppelin, pioneer of the rigid airship, in 1900. The cepelinai shape resembles a Zeppelin airship. Cepelinai are typically around 10–30 cm long, although the size depends on where they are made: in the western counties of Lithuania cepelinai are made bigger than in the east. In Samogitia cepelinai are called cepelinā.

After boiling, the cepelinai are often served with sour cream sauce and bacon bits or pork rinds.

In the Suwałki Region, Podlachia, Warmia and Masuria, it is known as kartacz (pol.: grapeshot). It is part of the cuisine of north-eastern Poland.

Similar dishes include Polish pyzy, Swedish kroppkaka, Acadian poutine râpée, Norwegian raspeball, German Kartoffelklöße and Italian canederli.

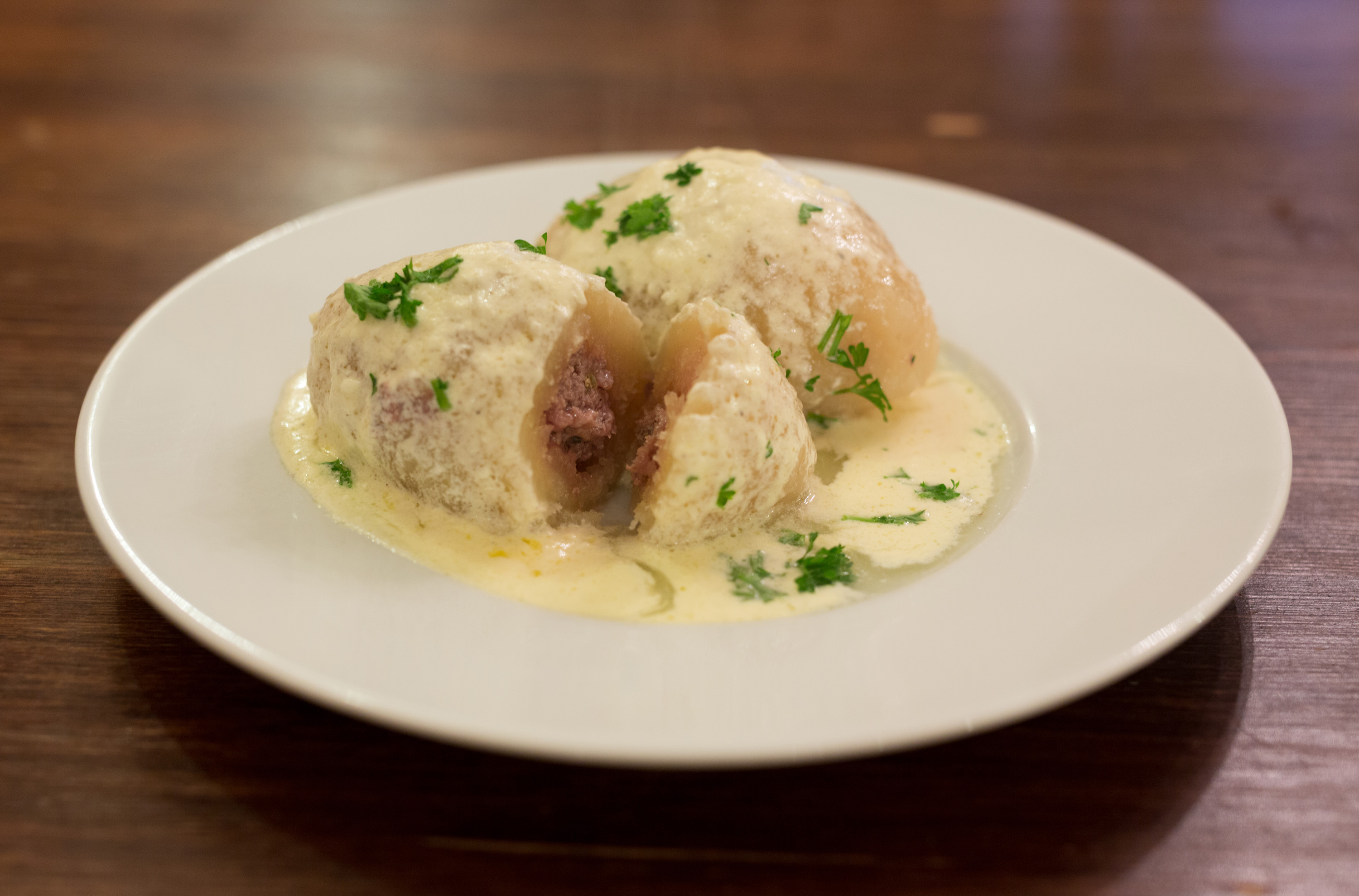
Cepelinai with ground meat cut open

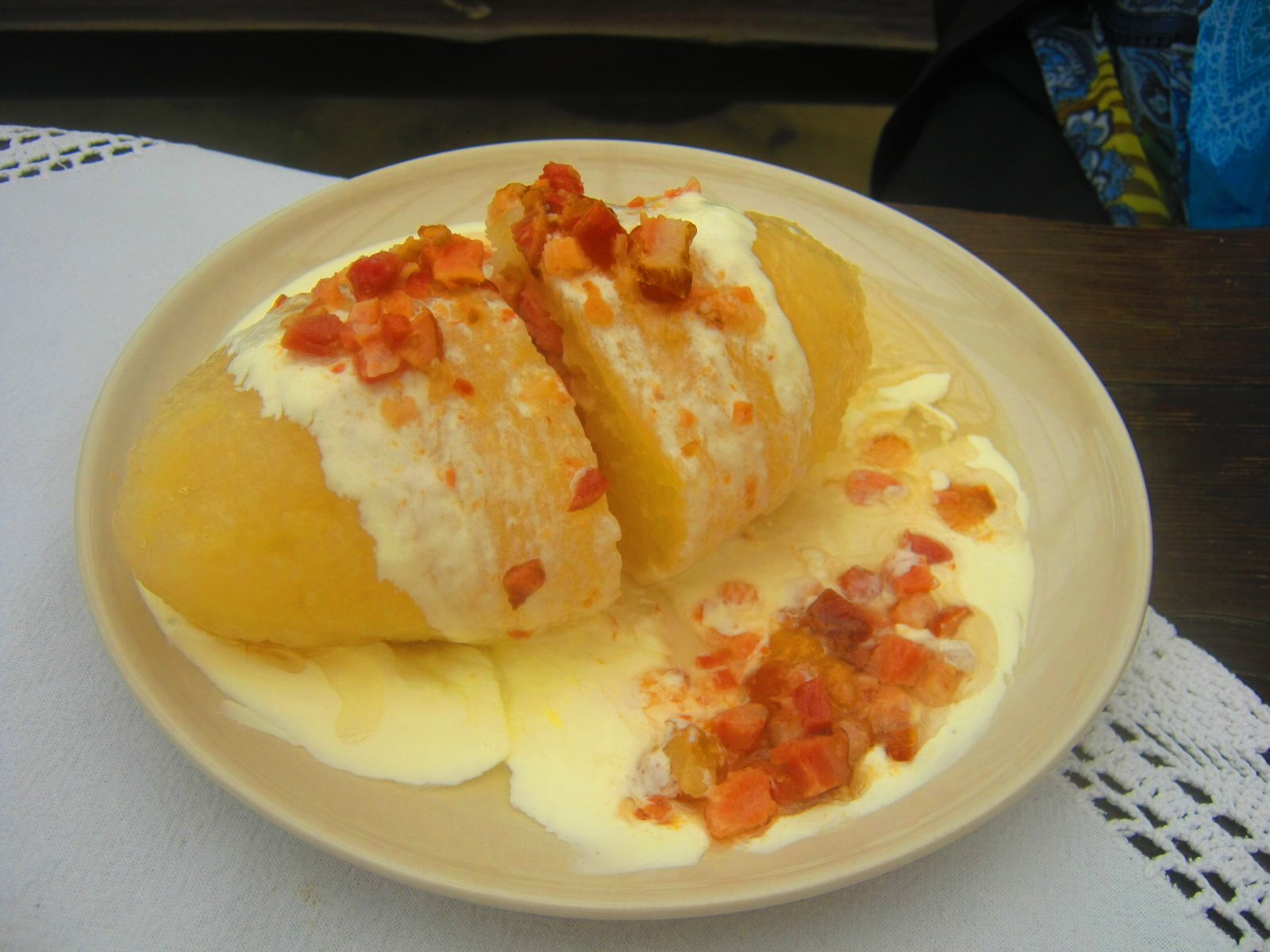
Large cepelinas served with pork rinds

== See also ==
- Ba-wan
