= Frankenburg Dice Game =

1626 conflict in Austria

The Frankenburg Dice Game (in German: Frankenburger Würfelspiel) in 1625 was the prelude to the Upper Austrian Peasants' War and took place against the historical background of the Counter-Reformation. The event took place in Haushamerfeld in Pfaffing, which at that time belonged to the county of Frankenburg. The name "dice game" originated in the 19th century. The dice in the local coat of arms Pfaffing symbolise this event.

== History ==
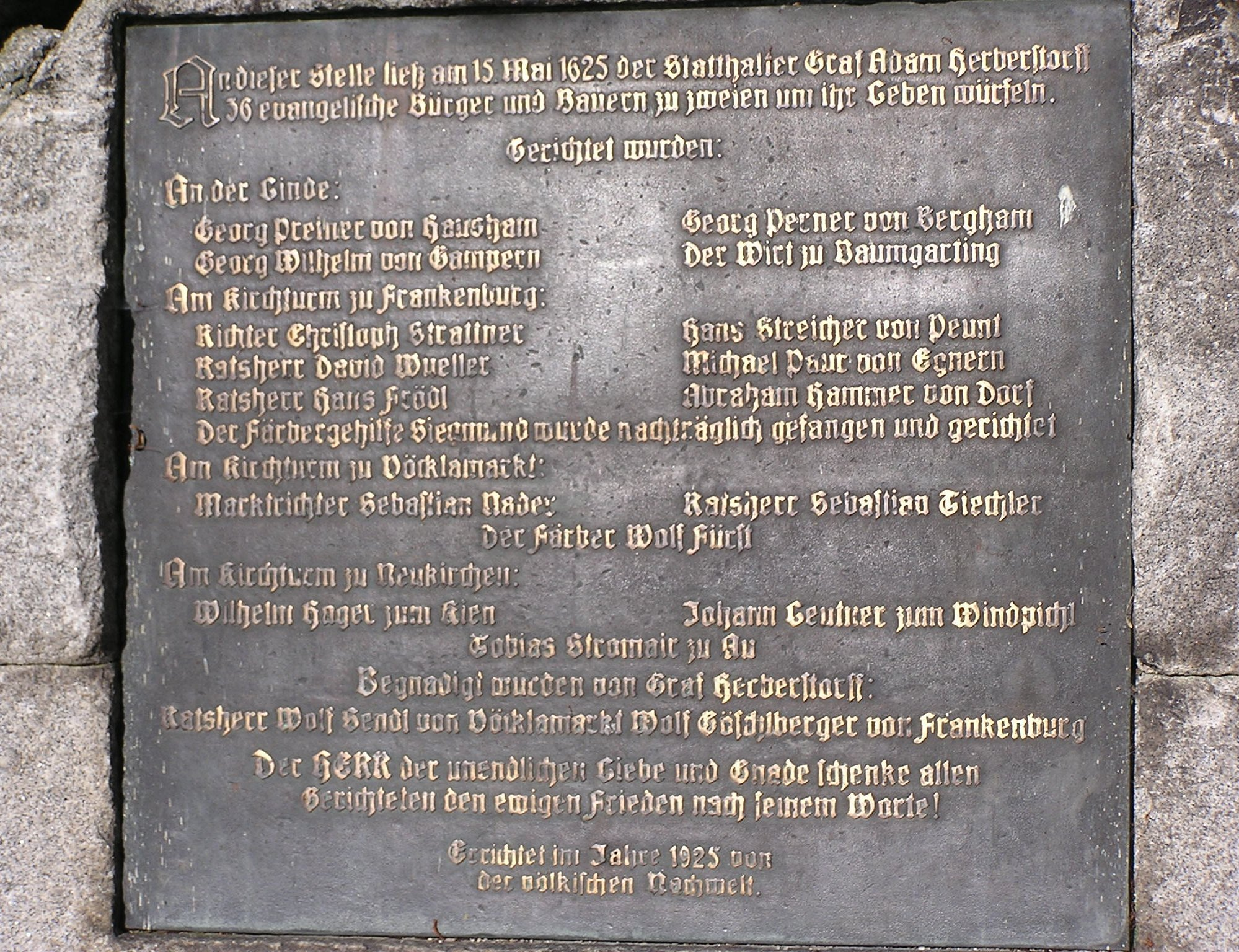
Memorial stone at the scene of the Frankenburg dice game

In 1620, at the beginning of the Thirty Years' War, Upper Austria was pledged by the Habsburgs to the Bavarian Duke Maximilian I for lack of its own financial resources for the war coffers. In the period that followed, Maximilian sent numerous tax officials as well as Catholic clergymen to Upper Austria to enforce the Counter-Reformation in accordance with the legal principle Cuius regio, eius religio. When a Catholic priest was to be appointed in the Protestant parish of Frankenburg in May 1625, there was an armed uprising. The parish priest was chased away and the county's keeper was besieged in Frankenburg Castle. After being promised mercy, the rebels gave up the siege.

The Bavarian governor in the region above the Enns, Count Adam von Herberstorff, also promised mercy when he summoned all the male inhabitants of the county to Haushamerfeld, situated between Frankenburg and Vöcklamarkt, on 15 May to hold court over the rebels. A total of about 5,000 men were rounded up there, among them the 36 suspected ringleaders of the Frankenburg uprising. These were shielded by Bavarian soldiers and told by Herberstorff that they were sentenced to death. Herberstorff, however, had half of them "pardoned", for which he had the 36 concerned thrown dice for their lives in pairs. 16 losers of the ensuing dice game were hanged, and two other losers were pardoned. A dyeing helper was later caught and also hanged so that a total of 17 men were judged.

This drastic punitive action did not have the effect Herberstorff had hoped for, but became the trigger for a carefully planned peasant uprising in Upper Austria that broke out in May 1626.

=== Aftermath ===
After the end of the Thirty Years' War, numerous Protestant refugees from Upper Austria, found a new home in Sulzbürg, Mühlhausen.

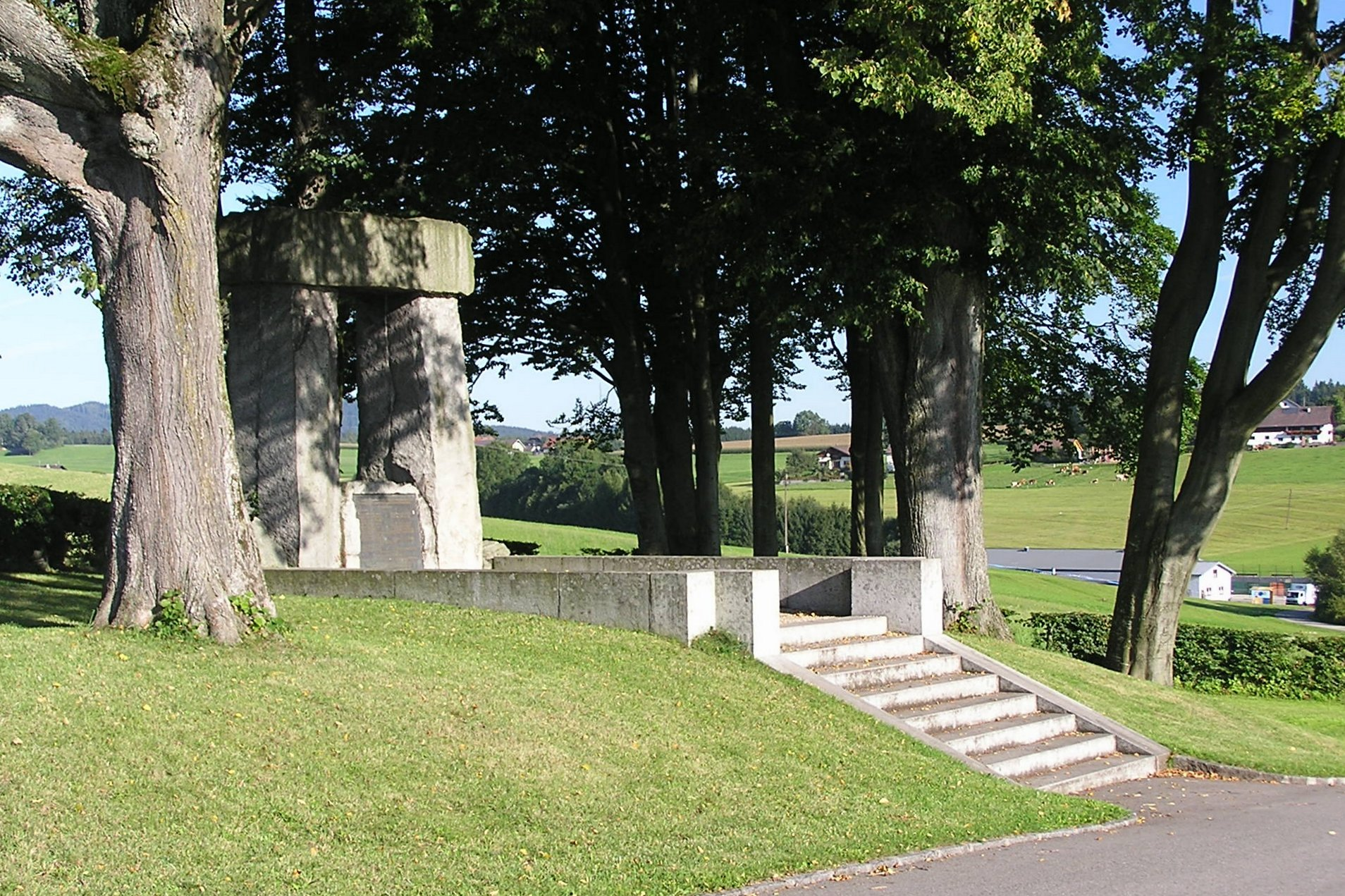
Monument at the placed of the Frankenburg dice game

== Cultural significance ==
=== Theatre play ===
- Since 1925, this dramatic event has been re-enacted in a two-year cycle by over 400 amateur actors - among them numerous descendants of those convicted at the time. It has become one of the cultural and touristic attractions of Frankenburg am Hausruck market town.
- Commissioned by Joseph Goebbels, Eberhard Wolfgang Möller wrote the Frankenburg Dice Game, which premiered in 1936 as part of the programme accompanying the 1936 Summer Olympics. This Berlin "dice game", however, has nothing in common with the Frankenburg play except for the historical background.

=== In fiction ===
Karl Itzinger: Das Blutgericht am Haushamerfeld. Aus der Leidens- und Heldenzeit des Landes ob der Enns. Novel, Leopold Stocker Verlag, Graz/Leipzig 1933. First published under the title Der Bauerntod. Heimatverlag Stocker, Graz 1925.

=== In literature ===
- Georg Heilingsetzer: 1626. Der oberösterreichische Bauernkrieg. Oberösterreichische Heimatblätter. Sonderpublikation 2001, Linz 2001.
- Hannes Leidinger: Geschichte der Erinnerung. Zur Rezeption des oberösterreichischen Bauernkriegs. In: Karl Vocelka, Rudolf Leeb, Andrea Scheichl (Hrsg.): Renaissance und Reformation, OÖ. Landesausstellung 2010. Linz 2010, S. 341–346.
- Franz Isidor Proschko: Streifzüge im Gebiethe der Geschichte und Sage des Landes ob der Enns. In: Jahrbuch des Oberösterreichischen Musealvereines. Jahrgang 14, Linz 1854, S. 1–10 (gesamter Artikel S. 1–116, zobodat.at PDF).
- Siegfried Haider: Die dunklen Seiten unserer Geschichte. In: Jahrbuch des Oberösterreichischen Musealvereines. Jahrgang 160, Linz 2015, S. 199–200

=== In cinema ===
Alfred Jungraithmayr: Frankenburger Würfelspiel. Dokumentarfilm. 98 Minuten. Deutschland 1988.

== Sources ==
- Das Frankenburger Würfelspiel (historisches Laientheater)
- Frankenburg Dice Game in Austria-Forum (in German) (at AEIOU)
- Volksbrauchtum und volkskundliche Kostbarkeiten: Frankenburger Würfelspiel in Austria-Forum (in German) (postage stamp)
- Der Henker und das bittere Würfelspiel Wiener Zeitung 21 June 2012, Supplement "ProgrammPunkte", S. 7. Retrieved 26 June 2012.
