= Veste Oberhaus =

Fortress in Germany

Coordinates: 48°34′39″N 13°28′13″E

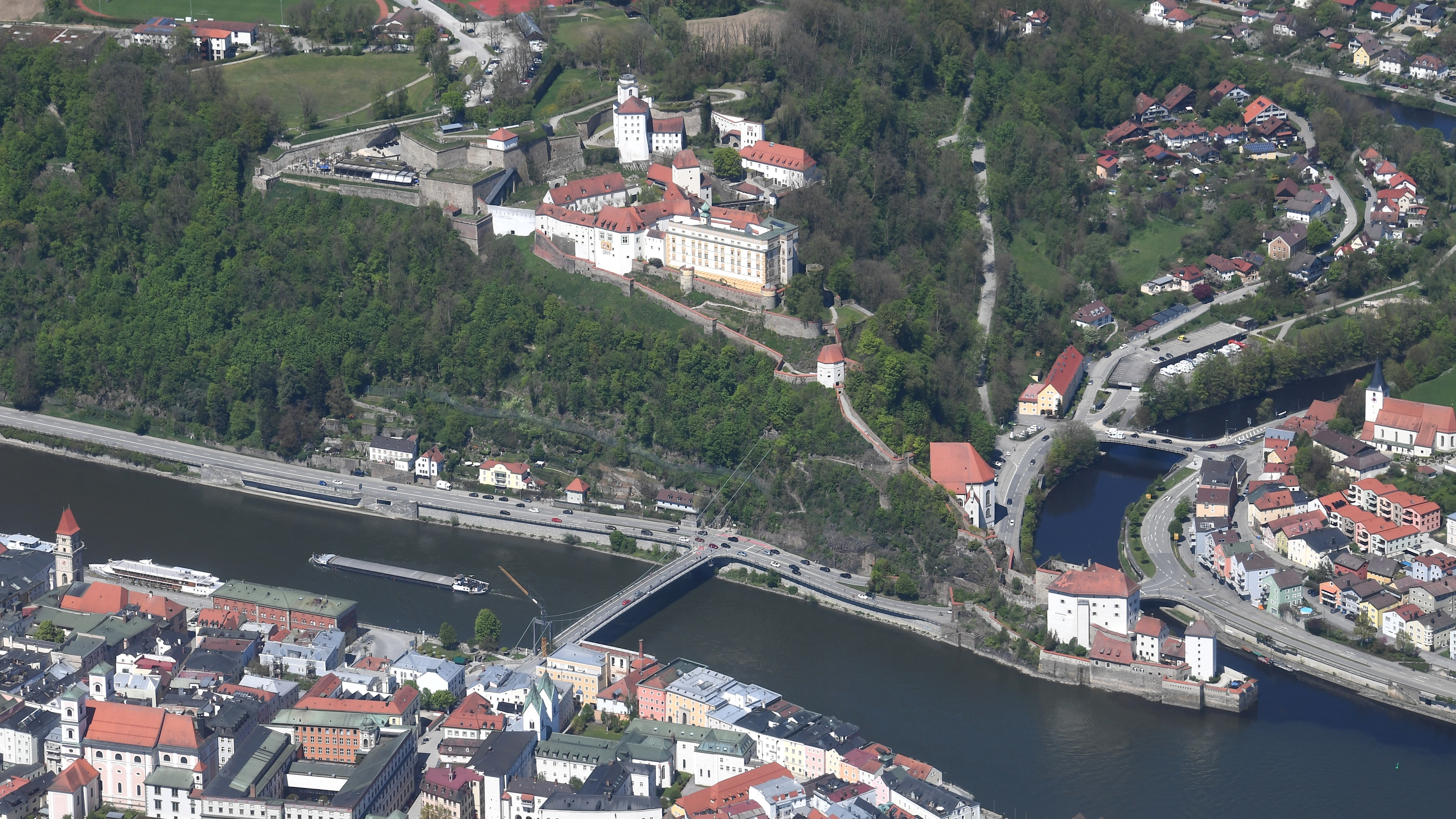
Aerial image of the Veste Oberhaus

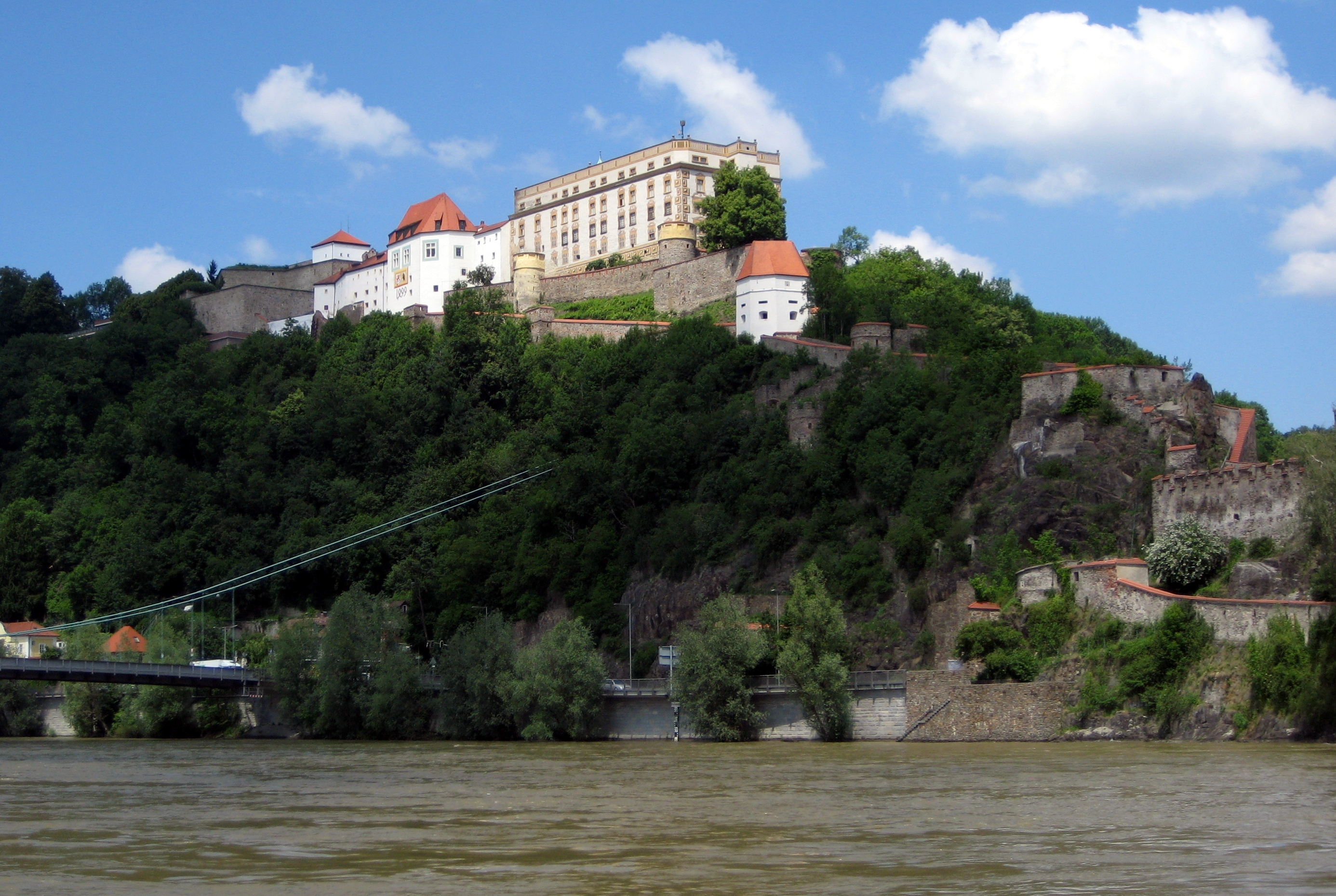
Veste Oberhaus

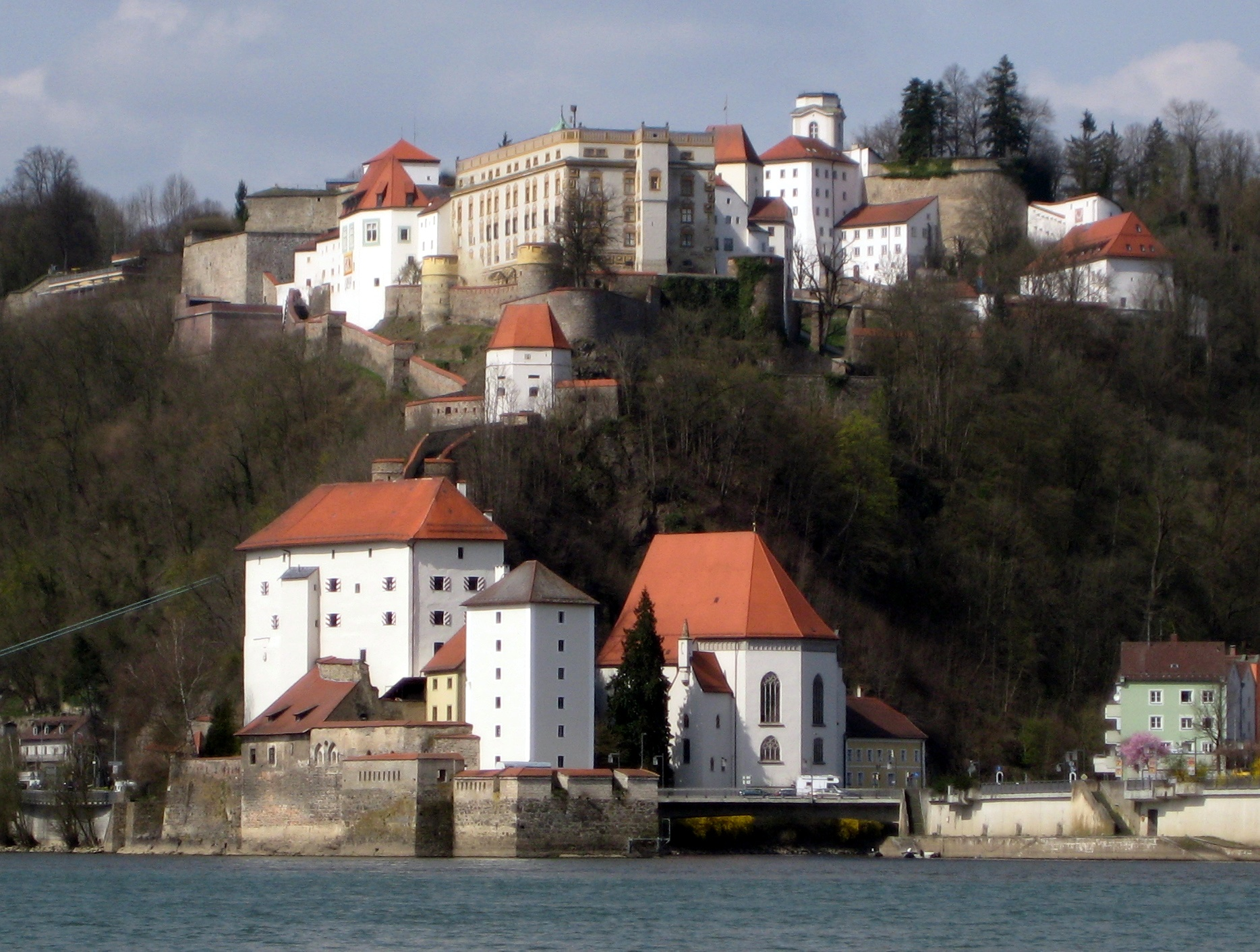
Veste Oberhaus above Veste Niederhaus (left) and 15th-century pilgrimage church of St. Salvator (right)

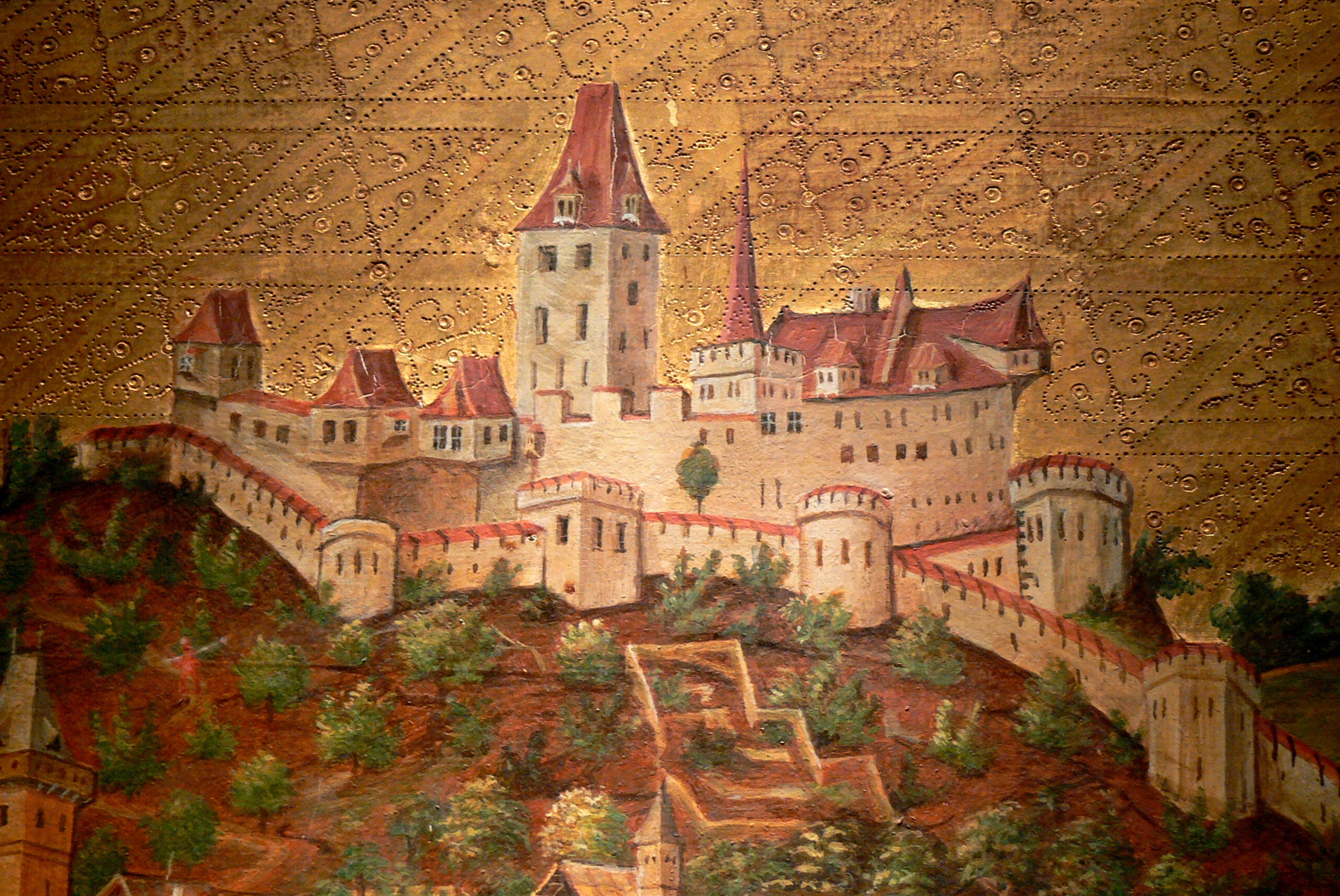
View of the fortress in the 15th century, Oberhausmuseum

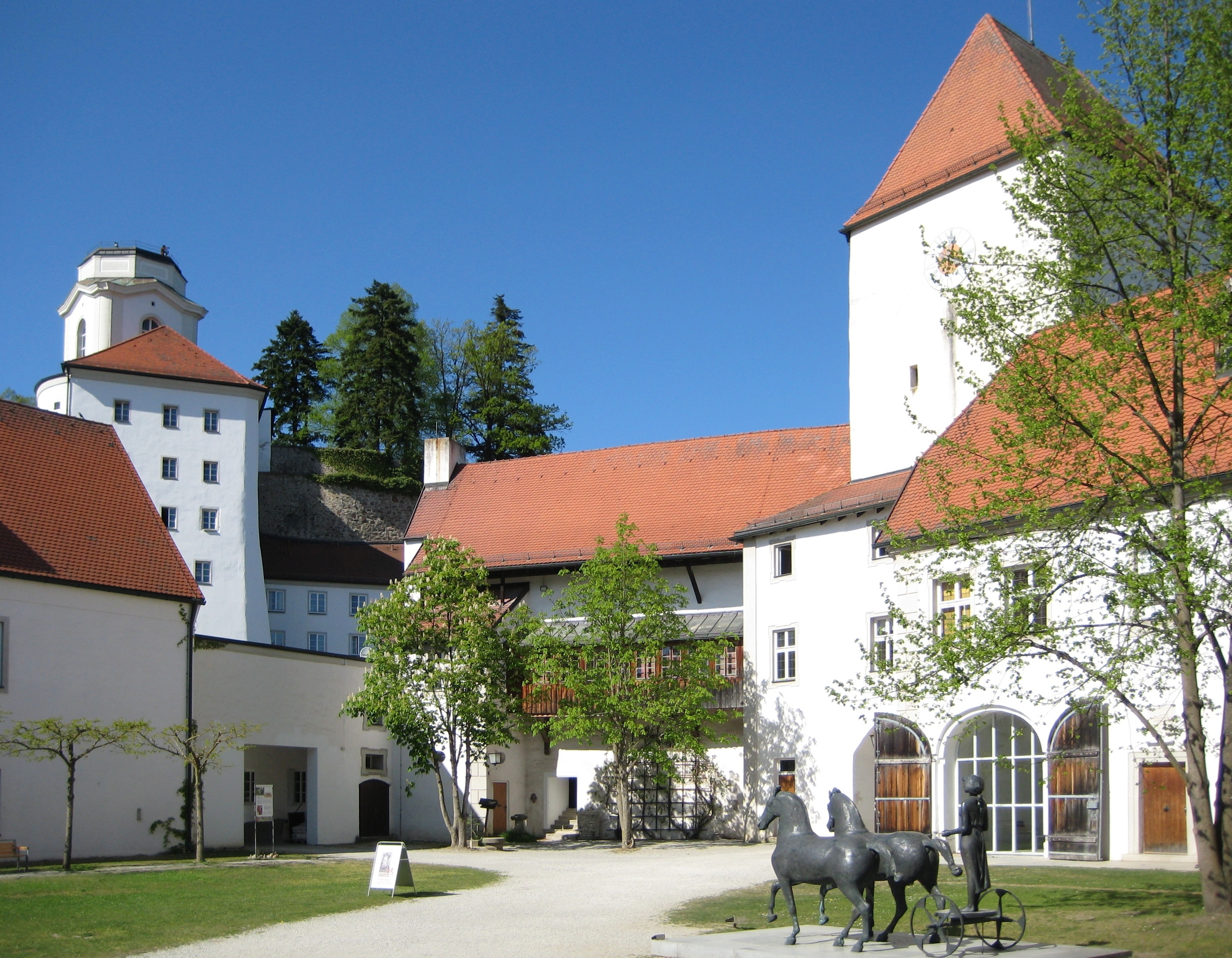
Inner courtyard

Veste Oberhaus is a fortress that was founded in 1219 and, for most of its time, was the stronghold of the Bishop of Passau, Germany. It is now the site of a museum, a youth hostel and a restaurant.

The fortress is located on the mountain crest (St. Georgsberg) on the left side of the Danube, between it and the Ilz, and dominates the old city of Passau, which it faces across the Danube. Below Oberhaus on the promontory between the two rivers is Veste Niederhaus, part of the fortress system.

== History ==
The fortress was built in 1219 by Ulrich II, the first prince-bishop of Passau, at the location of a previously existing chapel dedicated to St. George. The intention was to express the military strength of the bishopric and support the bishop's status as an elector of the Holy Roman Empire, granted in 1217, and also to protect against both external enemies and internal threats such as those citizens of Passau who wished to acquire the independent status of a free imperial city.

As siege techniques improved over the centuries, Veste Oberhaus was repeatedly renovated and extended, beginning in 1255–56, so that it offers an opportunity to study fortification techniques from the 13th through the early 19th century. The inscription "1499" prominent on the facade refers to one of these renovations. The most significant rebuilding took place under Leonhard von Laiming, Christoph von Schachner, Urban von Trennbach and Johann Philipp von Lamberg. Under them, the fortress developed from a Gothic citadel to an early Renaissance princely residence, a "fortified princely castle" and, finally, in the era of invasion by the Turks, a regional fortress and symbol of aristocratic status. Archeological investigations in the 1990s revealed traces of a 17th-century residential tower.

The fortress was attacked five times between 1250 and 1482, each time without success. Twice, in 1298 and 1367, the attackers were the citizens of Passau themselves in rebellion against the bishop.

Between 1535 and 1540, numerous Anabaptists were imprisoned in the castle dungeon for their beliefs. During their imprisonment, the Ausbund hymnal, still used in Amish religious services, was developed. Some of the hymn writers died while imprisoned; many were martyred.

In 1704, 1742 and 1800 the fortress was forced to surrender to various forces. Secularization in 1802 brought an end to the rule of the bishop. Napoleon made use of the fortress during his campaign against Austria, placing it under the control of his allies the Bavarians as a border outpost, but in 1805 it surrendered to the Austrian army. After the Congress of Vienna the area was controlled by Bavaria and for almost a century, until 1918, the fortress served an additional purpose as a state and military prison. It was feared as the "Bastille of Bavaria".

In 1932, the City of Passau gained possession of Veste Oberhaus and instituted a museum, the Ostmarkmuseum (today's Oberhausmuseum).

== Setting and buildings ==
The location of the fortress is the St. Georgsberg mountain, 105 metres (344 ft) above the valley floor between the Danube and the Ilz. Steep cliffs fall off on both sides. The smaller Veste Niederhaus, connected to Veste Oberhaus by a battlement, is located below on the bank of the Danube; this addition, made after 1367, created a double fortress almost 700 metres (2,300 ft) in length.

A road rises to Veste Oberhaus on the Ilz side. On foot, the castle can be reached via the 200 steps of the Oberhausleiten-Stiege stairway from the Schanzlbrücke Danube bridge. The main gate, the Ravelintor, bears the arms of Cardinal Johann Philipp von Lamberg and was built in 1703. This leads to the Kronwerke, a Baroque bailey constructed in 1674–1740, and a second defensive area dating mostly to the 16th century. From this middle defensive ring, the Burgstraße leads past the main watchtower (built around 1350) and across a drawbridge through a tower built in 1433 to the main fortress. The gate tower at this point bears the arms of Prince Bishop Leonhard von Laiming dated 1440. The buildings encircling the outer courtyard are 16th-century. The church of St. George in the inner courtyard has early and high Gothic frescoes and predates the fortress; it was renovated in Baroque style. The building erected by Christoph von Schachner in 1499–1503 with the highly visible coat of arms and date of 1499 on its facade contains a ceremonial Rittersaal (knights' hall) on the upper floor; this is connected by an open arcade to the dirnitz and princely suite, which date to the 14th–17th centuries. A cannon battery is housed on the lower story under the Rittersaal.

The so-called "Linde Battery", a terrace within the walls of the Veste Oberhaus, offers a good view of the Dreiflüsseeck (three rivers corner), the confluence of the Inn, Danube and Ilz; the differing colors of the three rivers are clearly visible from this point.

== Oberhausmuseum and former Thingplatz ==
The Oberhausmuseum includes the museum of the city of Passau, an art gallery, collections covering the history of Eastern Bavaria, Bohemia and Austria, a firefighting museum and a porcelain collection. Today, the fortress also houses a restaurant, a viewing platform on the so-called Observation Tower dating to the 18th century, an observatory and a youth hostel in the so-called General's Building dating to 1597.

In 1905, curator Wolfgang M. Schmid set up several rooms in Passau's town hall as a city museum. The first exhibits included archaeological finds, objects relating to the prince-bishopric and civic city, coins, weapons and ethnographic exhibits.

In 1931, the city of Passau acquired the Veste Oberhaus. In 1932, the holdings of the previous municipal museum were moved there. The opening took place in the fall. On May 20, 1933, it was reopened as the Ostmarkmuseum.

Under Mayor Max Moosbauer, some rooms were converted into representative guest rooms from May 1937. The remaining museum rooms were still accessible. In May 1945, US troops captured the Veste and used it as a rest center for American soldiers until February 1946. After the establishment of an auxiliary hospital for tuberculosis and venereal diseases in the castle complex in February 1946, the newly created Oberhausmuseum was opened on August 26, 1952, a few weeks after the hospital was closed.

The baroque-era forward fortifications of the Veste were replaced by a Thingplatz open-air theatre. In the form of an amphitheater in the approximate form of a quarter circle, this was designed by Ludwig Moshamer and had approximately 6,000 seats and room for approximately 18,000 standees. Ground was broken on August 26, 1934, and the facility was dedicated on September 22, 1935. In 1937 Eberhard Wolfgang Möller's Frankenburger Würfelspiel was performed; this concerned an event that happened not far away from Passau, and was to have been repeated annually, but political objections by the Austrians prevented it. In 1938, 85 boys and 162 girls born in 1927 and 1928 were sworn in there as Hitler Youth. The Thingplatz is no longer in use, no remains are visible.

== See also ==
- List of forts
