= Frankenburg am Hausruck =

Frankenburg am Hausruck Fraungabuag
- Municipality
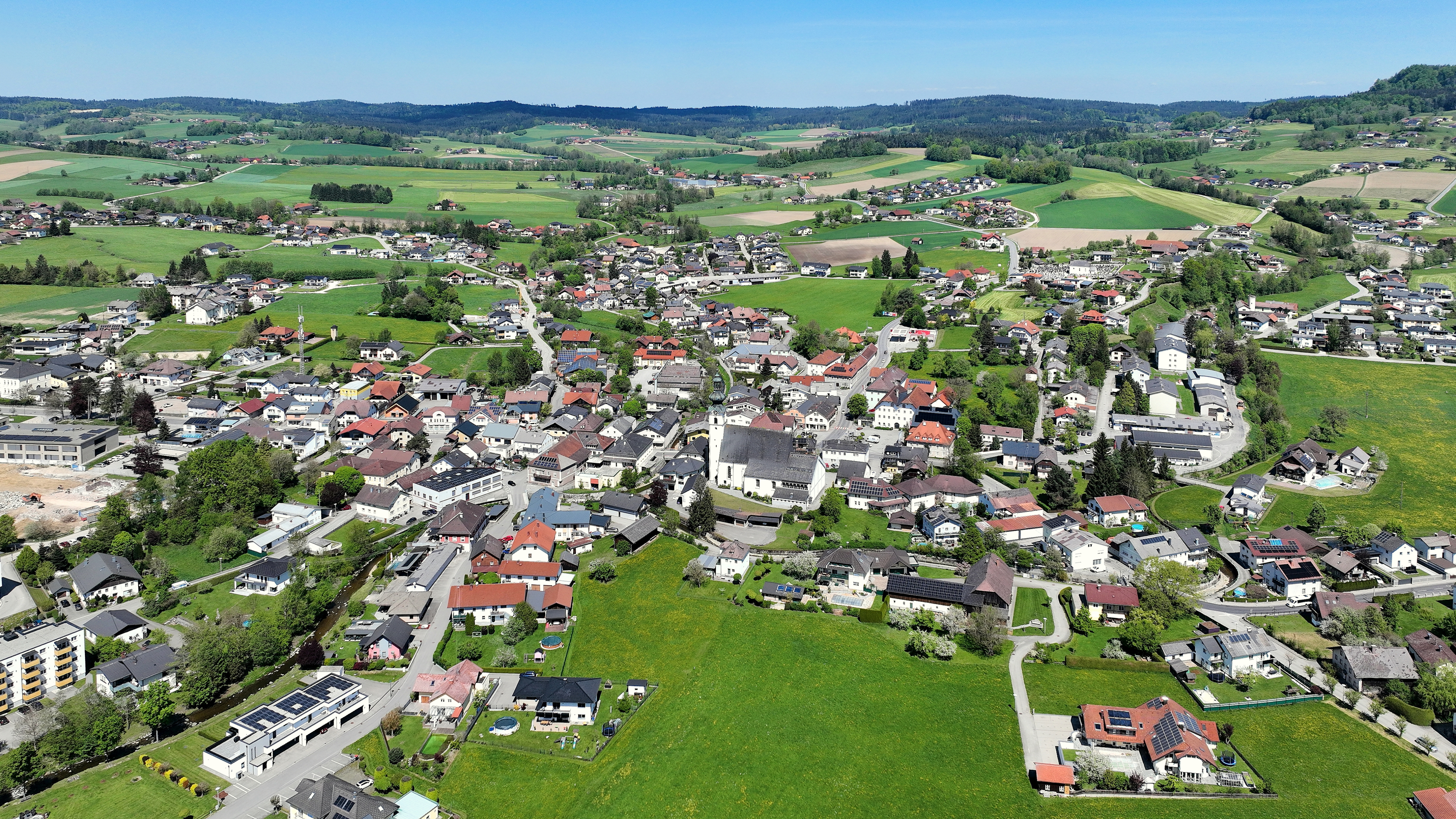
- South view of Frankenburg am Hausruck

- Coat of arms

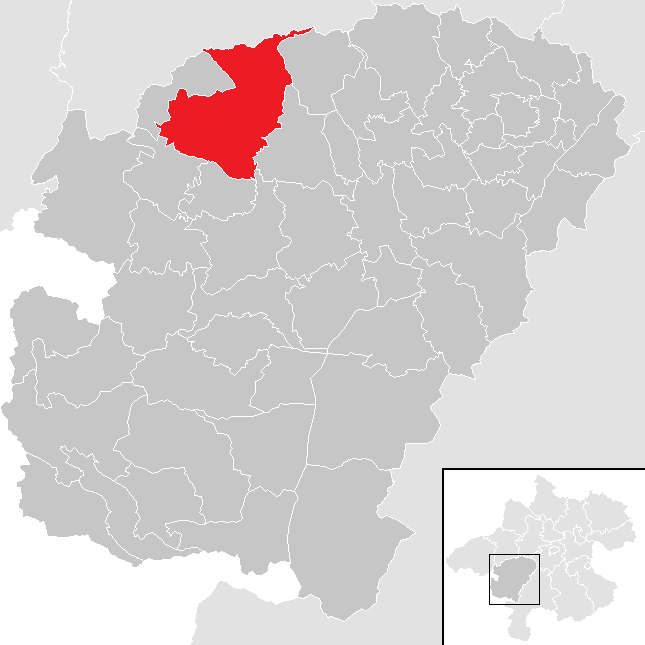
- Location in the district

- Location within Austria
- Coordinates: 48°04′06″N 13°29′31″E
- Country: Austria
- State: Upper Austria
- District: Vöcklabruck

Government
  - Mayor: Heinz Leprich (SPÖ)

Area
  - Total: 48.55 km^{2} (18.75 sq mi)
- Elevation: 519 m (1,703 ft)

Population (2018-01-01)
  - Total: 4,842
  - Density: 99.73/km^{2} (258.3/sq mi)
- Time zone: UTC+1 (CET)
  - Summer (DST): UTC+2 (CEST)
- Postal code: 4873
- Area code: 07683
- Vehicle registration: VB
- Website: www.frankenburg.info

Frankenburg am Hausruck (Central Bavarian: Fraungabuag) is a municipality in the district of Vöcklabruck in the Austrian state of Upper Austria.

== History ==
Frankenburg was part of the Roman province Noricum since the year 16 AD. Around 600, Bavarians migrated from the area of Franken and cleared the area in the Hausruck. Around 1100, Rapoto von Julbach built the Frankenburg on the Hofberg, which gave it its name. Since the 12th century the village belonged to the Duchy of Austria. Since 1490 it has been assigned to the principality of Upper Austria.

Hans von Khevenhüller-Frankenburg bought Kammer Castle from Emperor Rudolf II in 1581, as well as the dominions of Kogl Castle (where the Khevenhüllers built Kogl Castle in 1750) and Frankenburg with Frein Castle, which were united to form the "County of Frankenburg". Castle Frankenburg on the Hofberg was abandoned as the administrative seat, and on June 11, 1621, Emperor Ferdinand II elevated Frankenburg to the status of the market town.

When in May 1625 - at the time of the Thirty Years' War - a Roman Catholic clergyman was to be installed in Frankenburg, there was an armed rebellion by the majority of Protestant-minded citizens and farmers. However, this rebellion was abandoned after three days because the Bavarian governor Adam Graf von Herberstorff promised "mercy" if the rebels came to Haushamerfeld without arms and weapons. However, this "mercy" was terrible: Herberstorff appeared accompanied by a strong military unit and declared the Frankenburgers present condemned to death. Thirty-six committee men had to roll the dice for their lives in pairs: half of them were pardoned, the other found death by hanging. This Frankenburg dice game was the prelude to the Upper Austrian Peasant Wars. Karl Itzinger set a literary monument to this event in his novel Das Blutgericht am Haushamerfeld (The Blood Court at Haushamer Field), and since 1925 they have been reenacted every two years by some 400 amateur actors on the largest open-air stage in Europe.

During the Napoleonic Wars the place was occupied several times. At that time, the Khevenhüllers sold the dominions of Kogl and Frankenburg to the Viennese lawyer Andreas Pausinger (1765–1818), who also acquired the dominions of Ungenach and Unterach am Attersee from Khevenhüller. In 1816, Pausinger was elevated to hereditary nobility by King Maximilian I Joseph of Bavaria.

After Pausinger's death, his estates in Frankenburg, Kogl, Ungenach and Unterach were divided among his surviving heirs. As the first-born, Franz von Pausinger (1794–1850) received Frankenburg, which he sold, however, as early as 1828 to his brother Karl Johann (1795–1848), who also bought up the remaining shares by 1834 and thus became the sole owner of the manors. Schloss Frein in Frankenburg town centre was owned by the von Pausinger family from 1810 to 1848. After the death of Karl Johann von Pausinger in 1848, the estates were divided among his children Karl Valentin, Felix and Julia. Karl Valentin von Pausinger sold the Frankenburg estate to Franz Schaupp in 1849, while his brother Felix sold the Kogl and Unterach estates to industrialist Franz Mayr von Melnhof in 1872.

Since 1918, the village of Frankenburg has belonged to the State of Upper Austria. After the annexation of Austria to the German Reich on March 13, 1938, the village belonged to the Gau Oberdonau. In 1945, the restoration of Upper Austria took place.

== The Dice Game ==
The town is known as the site of an incident known as the Frankenburger Würfelspiel (Frankenburg Dice Game). In 1625, during the Counter-Reformation, Lutheran peasants revolted against the attempt by the local landowner, Count Herberstorff, to impose a Catholic priest on the town. Despite his promise of amnesty, the Count had the town leaders arrested, divided them into groups of two, and forced each pair to gamble with dice for their lives. Thirty-six men were hanged. This act triggered the Upper Austrian peasants' revolt of 1626. The revolt was defeated and Catholicism was reimposed. In remembrance of the event, a festival has been held every other year since 1925, including performances at what is claimed to be the largest open-air theatre in Europe.

In 1936 the incident was the subject of a play, Frankenburger Würfelspiel, by the German dramatist Eberhard Wolfgang Möller. The play was commissioned by the German Propaganda Minister, Joseph Goebbels, for the opening of the Dietrich-Eckart-Bühne, an outdoor theatre (Thingplatz) near the Berlin Olympic Stadium (now called the Waldbühne). Goebbels was closely involved in the writing and staging of the play. The anti-Austrian and anti-Catholic aspects of the Frankenburg incident were exploited in the play to serve the Nazi regime's nationalist propaganda aims.

The play was denounced by the Austrian government and banned in Austria. After the Anschluss of 1938, the play was triumphantly staged by the Nazi authorities at Frankenburg and other places in Austria. Speeches were delivered at Frankenburg by Austrian Nazis proclaiming that Adolf Hitler (who was born not far away at Braunau am Inn) had avenged the Frankenburg peasants and delivered Austria from the "chains" of the Catholic Church.

Today a local re-enactment of the Frankerburg Dice Games is carried out every two years in the municipality, making it a cultural attraction.

== Geography ==
Frankenburg am Hausruck is situated at an altitude of 519 m in the Hausruckviertel. The extension from north to south is 10.6 km, from west to east 10.3 km. The total area is 48.5 km², 44.5% of the area is forested, 49.3% of the area is used for agriculture.

=== Municipal divisions ===
The municipal territory includes the following 63 localities (in parentheses number of inhabitants as of January 1, 2022):

* Arbing (40)
- Au (118)
- Außerhörgersteig (41)
- Badstuben (89)
- Brunnhölzl (22)
- Diemröth (44)
- Dorf (76)
- Egg (73)
- Engern (28)
- Erdpries (4)
- Erlatwaid (50)
- Exlwöhr (25)
- Finkenröth (12)
- Fischeredt (36)
- Fischigen (19)
- Frankenburg am Hausruck (2238)
- Friedhalbing (30)
- Geldigen (14)
- Göblberg (3)
- Grünbergsiedlung (84)
- Halt (39)
- Haslach (39)
- Haslau (51)
- Hintersteining (35)
- Hoblschlag (52)
- Hofberg (38)
- Innerhörgersteig (63)
- Innerleiten (155)
- Kinast (20)
- Klanigen (136)
- Leitrachstätten (19)
- Lessigen (292)
- Loixigen (100)
- Marigen (15)
- Märzigen (22)
- Mauern (34)
- Mayrhof (24)
- Mitterriegl (97)
- Mühlstaudet (31)
- Niederriegl (56)
- Oberedt (47)
- Oberfeitzing (17)
- Oberhaselbach (13)
- Ottigen (4)
- Ottokönigen (89)
- Pehigen (23)
- Perschling (32)
- Point (6)
- Pramegg (24)
- Raitenberg (32)
- Redltal (10)
- Renigen (45)
- Schnöllhof (60)
- Seibrigen (45)
- Stöckert (16)
- Tiefenbach (18)
- Unterau (43)
- Unteredt (20)
- Unterfeitzing (66)
- Unterhaselbach (43)
- Vordersteining (40)
- Wiederhals (23)
- Zachleiten (32)

The municipality consists of the cadastral communities Frankenburg, Frein, Hintersteining, Hofberg and Hörgersteig.

== Population ==
Historical population
Year	Pop.	±%
1991	5,013	—
2001	5,110	+1.9%
2006	5,190	+1.6%
2014	4,818	−7.2%

== Politics ==
The municipal council has 25 members.

- With the municipal and mayoral elections in Upper Austria 2009, the municipal council had the following distribution: 13 SPÖ, 9 ÖVP, 5 FPÖ and 4 GRÜNE.
- With the municipal council and mayoral elections in Upper Austria 2015, the municipal council had the following distribution: 12 SPÖ, 6 ÖVP, 5 FPÖ and 2 FAL.
- With the municipal and mayoral elections in Upper Austria 2021, the municipal council has the following distribution: 11 ÖVP, 10 SPÖ and 4 GRÜNE.

=== Mayors ===
- until 2013 Franz Sieberer (SPÖ)
- 2013-2019: Johann Baumann (SPÖ)
- 2019-2021: Heinz Leprich (SPÖ)
- since 2021: Norbert Weber (ÖVP)

== Culture and Sights ==
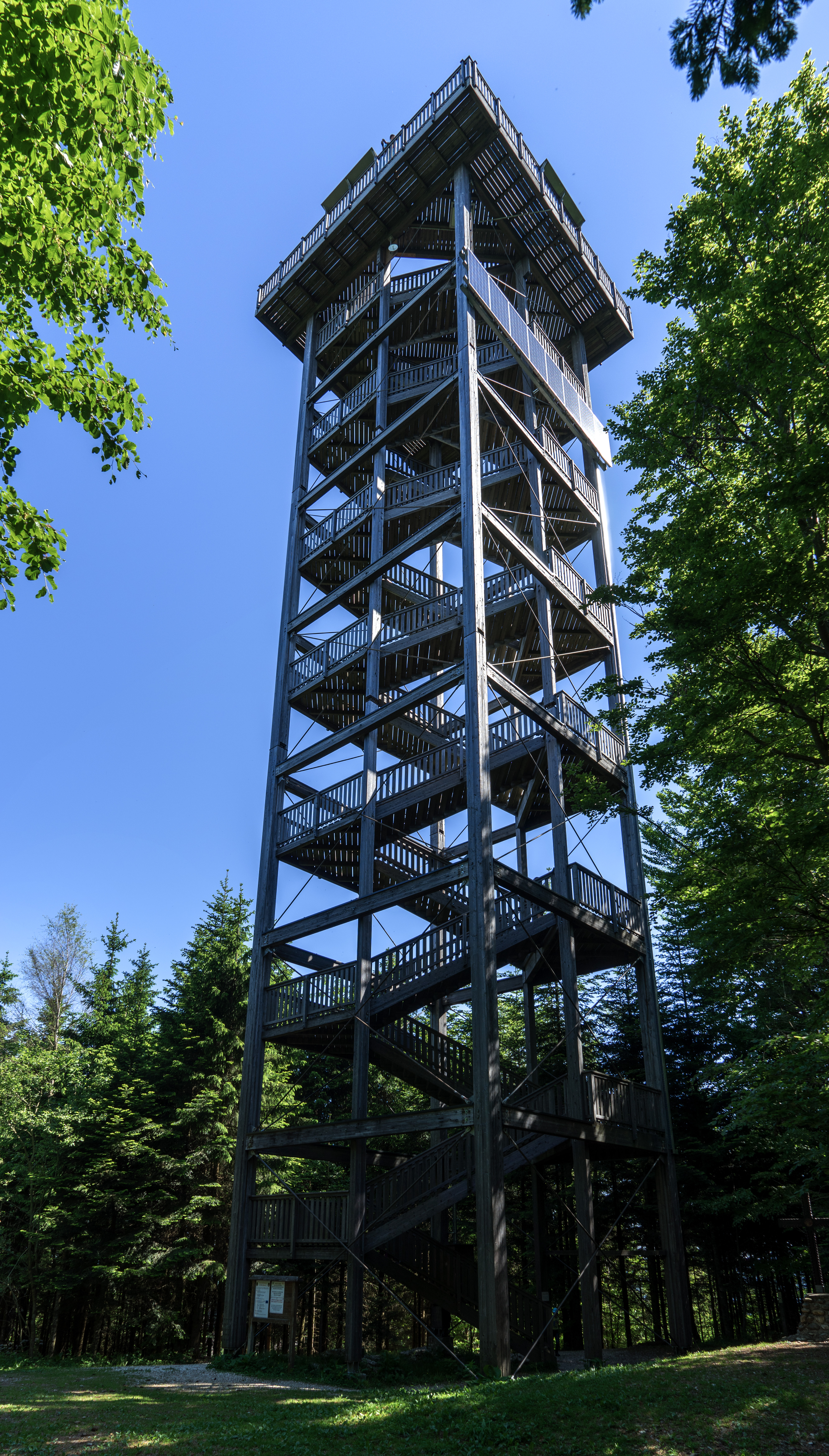
Lookout Tower ant the top of Göblberg

- Frankenburg: Frankenburg was a defensive fortress in the Middle Ages and later also an administrative seat. It was located on the Hofberg, a hill in the market town of Frankenburg.
- Frein Castle: Frein Castle originally belonged to Mattsee Abbey. In 1370 it was owned by the Mattsee burgher Chunrad der Schedinger. In 1593 Hans Christoph Geymann acquired the castle from the provincial estates. In 1621 Frein was sold with Frankenburg to Hans von Khevenhüller-Frankenburg. In 1674 it came into the possession of Andreas von Pausinger and his descendants until 1849, when the castle was acquired by Franz Schaup, one of the co-founders of the Zipf brewery. The brewery dynasty remained the owner until Emilie Schaup died childless in 1942. She had appointed the former baronial family Limbeck von Lilienau as her heirs. However, due to inheritance disputes, the castle was used by local Nazi officials until the end of the Second World War. After that, ethnic German war refugees were quartered in it for two years. Today, the building houses a local history room and the headquarters of the Frankenburg Forestry and Estate Administration, as well as the archives of the Frankenburg Local History Society. The owner and lord of the castle is Christian Limbeck-Lilienau, who lives in Vienna and in 2007 granted the Zogaj family free accommodation in the building.
- Parish church Frankenburg am Hausruck.
- Lookout tower at the Göblberg: The Göblberg is with 801 meters the highest elevation in the Hausruck in the middle of Upper Austria. Therefore, in good weather you can see almost the whole country. Hausruck and Kobernaußerwald consist of glacial gravels and form the largest contiguous forest area in Central Europe. The lookout tower was erected in 2006 by ARGE Aussichtsturm Göblberg as a Leader project of the market communities of Ampflwang and Frankenburg and was funded by the state of Upper Austria and the European Union. The lookout tower is located in the middle of the forest. The 35 meter high larch wood construction was planned by Ingenieurbüro Meinhart+Partner and executed by Schmid Bauunternehmung Holzbau GmbH from April to May 2006. The tower received recognition at the Upper Austrian Timber Construction Award for its technical know-how and solid construction as a "landmark that cannot be overlooked". The webcam on the observation tower faces east and south and shoots photos of Ampflwang and Frankenburg every five minutes. These are put on the web by Minniberger-flashnet. Power is supplied by a solar panel.
- The mountain panorama: In the north, the panorama stretches from the Großer Arber in the Bavarian Forest, 117 km away, to the Mühlviertel and the Hochficht. To the east, on a good day, you can see the Ötscher at a distance of 128 km. The peaks of the Sengsengebirge and the Totes Gebirge are closer. In front of them, the Traunstein stands out strikingly. The Höllengebirge in the south often seems close enough to touch, and behind the blue Attersee you can see the white peaks of the Dachstein. Also striking is the Schafberg, from which you can see the Salzburg mountains to the west: the Tennengebirge, Hochkönig and Untersberg. Watzmann and Hochstaufen lead to Bavaria and the Wendelstein on the edge of the Chiemgau Alps completes the mountain panorama. Further west, one can see the vast forests of the Kobernaußer Wald and above, 146 km away, some have already spotted the brightly lit oval of Munich's Allianz Arena at night.
- Botanical Garden: In Hintersteining, about five kilometers from the center, the botanical garden with a large biotope was opened in 1998.
- Hobelsberg-Riesn Nature Reserve: At Hobelsberg, a 4.1-hectare (10-acre) forest plot was dedicated as a nature reserve in 2005, which is particularly notable for its large occurrences of the wild moon violet.
- Cultural initiative KULIMU (art, literature, music)

=== Museums ===
- Dice Game House: It is not a museum in the sense of an accumulation of museum memorabilia. The purpose of it is to trace both the living conditions of people in the period of the 17th century and the history of the game in the 20th century. Its focus always remain on the people who experienced, shaped or suffered these two periods of history.
- Firebrigade Museum

=== Cuisine ===
Frankenburg is famous in Upper Austria for its bratknödel.

== Sports ==
The municipality is the seat for the following sport clubs:

- TSV Frankenburg
- ASKÖ Frankenburg
- Frankenburger Würfelspiellauf
- Feuerwehrsportgruppe Frankenburg/OÖ

== Coat of arms ==
Coat of arms of Frankenburg am Hausruck

Granted
11 June 1621
Escutcheon
Per fess: in chief Sable, bars gemel wavy under an oak twig fesswise with two leaves and one acorn erect, all Or; in base Gules, a bugle-horn Sable garnished Or with string interlooped Sable, resting on a cushion Argent tasseled Or on the four edges; overall an inescutcheon Azure, a capital letter F Or.
Symbolism
The acorn rice and the blazing streets are taken with the coat of arms of the Khebenhüller-Aichlberg. The Khevenhüllers, a family that probably originated from Khevenhüll in Middle Franconia, came to Villach in the 11th century through the Bamberg possessions in Carinthia. The dynasty came to the Attergau in 1581 when, after long negotiations, it acquired the three Attergau dominions of Frankenburg, Kammer and Kogl from the Habsburgs for the purchase price of 235,000 gulden. In 1593 the three dominions were elevated to the county of Frankenburg. Since 1427 the Khevenhüllers were owners of the castle Aichlberg in Carinthia and since then they also carried the coat of arms of the Aichlbergers, which appears in the municipal coats of arms of Frankenburg and Amflwang.

The lower part of the coat of arms with the post horn on a white cushion is taken from the coat of arms of Franz Christoph Khevenhüller's wife, Barbara Teufel von Guntersdorf.

Franz Christoph kidnapped Barbara Teufel in 1613 against the will of her parents and married her in Vienna. In the Khevenhüller Chronicle of Georg Moshamer (1623/24), Franz Christoph and Barbara are splendidly depicted on plates 408 and 409. He in Spanish court costume in front of Frein Castle, she in a richly decorated silver brocade dress in front of Weyregg Castle. The above-mentioned family coats of arms are also depicted on these two panels, thus providing a definite clue to the Frankenburg coat of arms.

The letter "F" refers to Emperor Ferdinand II.

== International relations ==
Sister cities:

- Vernon, British Columbia, Canada
