= Hans Baumann (writer) =

German writer (1914–1988)

Hans Baumann (22 April 1914 – 7 November 1988) was a German poet, songwriter, literary translator and author of children's books.

== Biography ==
Born in Amberg, Bavaria, in 1914 into a military family, Baumann was a German nationalist. He belonged to the Catholic organization "New Germany". He started writing songs and poems when he was still an adolescent (e.g. "Macht keinen Lärm", 1933). In 1934 he was noticed by the Hitler Youth leadership and invited to Berlin to work as a songwriter, author and journalist.

In 1935, Baumann applied for membership in SS-Sturm 11/75. He joined the NSDAP in 1933. Then, he served two years in the Wehrmacht.

In the 1930s he wrote numerous poems, ballads and songs with various themes, both political and romantic. Some of his songs, such as his famous 1932 Es zittern die morschen Knochen ("The frail bones tremble", especially known for the line changed, "Denn heute da hört uns Deutschland/Und morgen die ganze Welt", in English "For today Germany hears us/But tomorrow the whole world shall", where da hört was frequently replaced by gehört, "belongs to") which became the official marching song of the Reichsarbeitsdienst in 1935, were enormously popular within the Nazi movement, but are since the fall of Nazi Germany no longer accepted. Others, like the ballad Hohe Nacht der klaren Sterne, included less Nazi content and are to some degree still sung today (though that, too, is problematic especially in that it intended to be a replacement for Christmas carols purposely void of any specifically religious themes). The song collections Unser Trommelbube, Wir zünden das Feuer, Der helle Tag and others date from that period.

In September 1938, when Baumann visited Passau, the Donau-Zeitung informed its readers that Baumann was on his way to Bulgaria. The newspaper also announced Baumann's latest contribution to Bayerische Ostmark, where he praised Passau.

In February 1939, Baumann returned to Veste Oberhaus at Passau, where he recited from his new play Rüdiger von Bechelaren. In July 1940, the play was performed there for the second time.

At the outset of World War II he joined the German army in 1939 and spent most of the war on the Eastern front in a propaganda unit (Propagandakompanie 501). Continuing his work as much as possible throughout the war, he wrote two collections of war poems (Briefgedichte, 1941 and Der Wandler Krieg in 1942).

In December 1942, Baumann returned to Passau again. This time, to marry Elisabeth Zoglmann at Veste Oberhaus. Among his guests was Hans Carossa.

In April 1944, the Donau-Zeitung reported about a rally where Hans Baumann addressed Passau Hitler Youth.

After the war and a period spent in a prisoner of war camp, he distanced himself from the policies of the National Socialist government and made a remarkable comeback as one of the most popular contemporary writers for children and teenagers. His novels dealt with natural and historical themes (e.g. I Marched with Hannibal, The Sons of the Steppe, Barnabas the Dancing Bear, The Barque of the Brothers, Son of Columbus, In the Land of Ur) and won a number of international prizes, including the New York Herald Tribune prize for the best children's book in 1968 and the Batchelder Award in 1971. They have been compared to the novels of Rosemary Sutcliff, his earlier books described as major works: "long complicated stories, full of difficult concepts and problems of psychology".

His attempted strides into other literature genres were less successful as he was viewed with suspicion by the post-war German literary and political circles because of his past NS involvement. In 1962 he was at a center of a literary controversy when forced to return the prestigious Gerhard-Hauptmann Prize received in 1959 for his drama Im Zeichen der Fische (written under a pseudonym), after his real identity was revealed. Baumann was also an accomplished translator, having translated numerous books from Russian to German, including works by Dostoevsky, Tolstoy, Anna Akhmatova and others. His own work was translated into more than twenty languages.

He died in Murnau am Staffelsee (Bavaria) on 7 November 1988.

== Bibliography ==
Works translated into English

- The Caves of the Great Hunters (1955)
- Son of Columbus (1957)
- The Barque of the Brothers: A Tale of the Days of Henry the Navigator (1958)
- The Sons of the Steppe: The Story of how the Conqueror Genghis Khan Was Overcome (1958)
- The World of the Pharaohs (1960)
- I Marched with Hannibal (1961)
- Gold and Gods of Peru (1963)
- Lion Gate and Labyrinth (1967)
- Alexander's Great March (1968)
- In the Land of Ur: The Discovery of Ancient Mesopotamia (1969)
- Dimitri and the False Tsars (1970)
