= Frein Castle =

Coordinates: 48°04′02″N 13°28′58″E

- Schloss Frein (German)
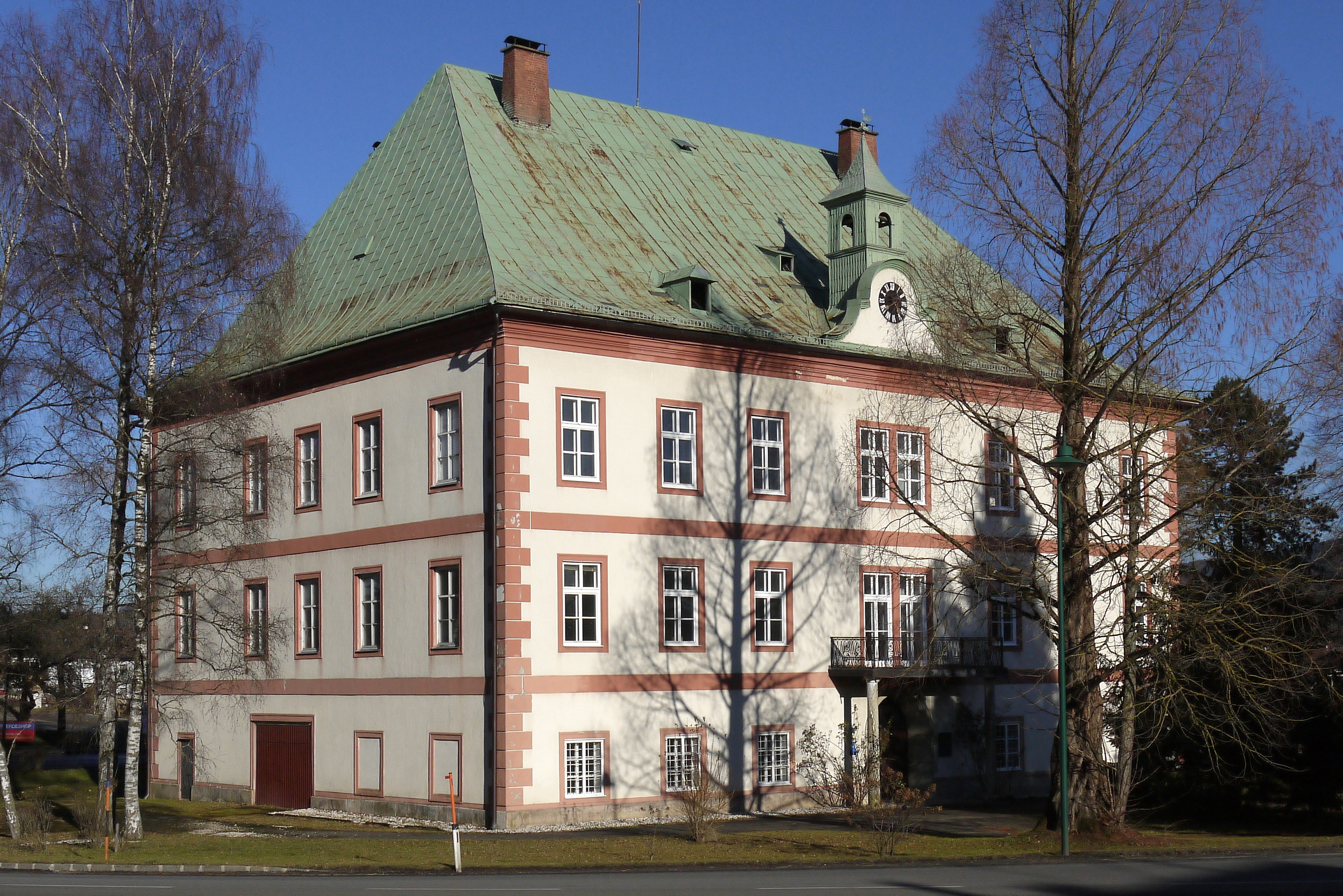

- Location within Austria
- Location: Frankenburg am Hausruck, Vöcklabruck, Upper Austria

History
- Built: 1370

Site notes
- Restored: 2007
- Restored by: Green Finance GmbH

Frein Castle is located in the Frein division of the municipality of Frankenburg am Hausruck in the Vöcklabruck district of Upper Austria.

== History ==
According to a document of Mattsee Abbey, in 1370 Frein was owned by Chunrad der Schedinger. In 1444, Greiff Schöttinger, who lived in Mattsee, was the owner of Freyn. In 1485 Emperor Frederick III granted Hans Gewmann the seat that had become deserted. In 1560 a Sebastian Huber became the owner, replacing the Zärtl von Geboltskirchen in ownership. His son Ludwig bequeathed the castle to the estates of the Land ob der Enns (Upper Austria) in 1584. From them Christoph Geymann acquired it again in 1593 together with the estate. At that time Frein was only a saw mill. Christoph's son of the same name was one of the Protestant rebels against the emperor and had to flee in 1620. The confiscated property was sold by Emperor Ferdinand II to Franz Christoph von Khevenhüller in 1626.

Between 1674 and 1684 the property belonged to Baron Veit von Gera, then it came back to the Khevenhüllers until 1810. The property united with Kogl Castle was bought by Dr. von Pausinger. From the Pausinger-Frischberg family Franz Schaupp acquired the castle with the forest and estate of Frankenburg in 1849. Schaupp was one of the co-founders of the Zipf Brewery. The brewery dynasty remained owners until 1942, when the last of the family, Emilie Schaupp, died childless. From the last bearer of the name, the former baronial family Limbeck von Lilienau, the grandchildren of Wilhelm Schaupp, became the heirs.

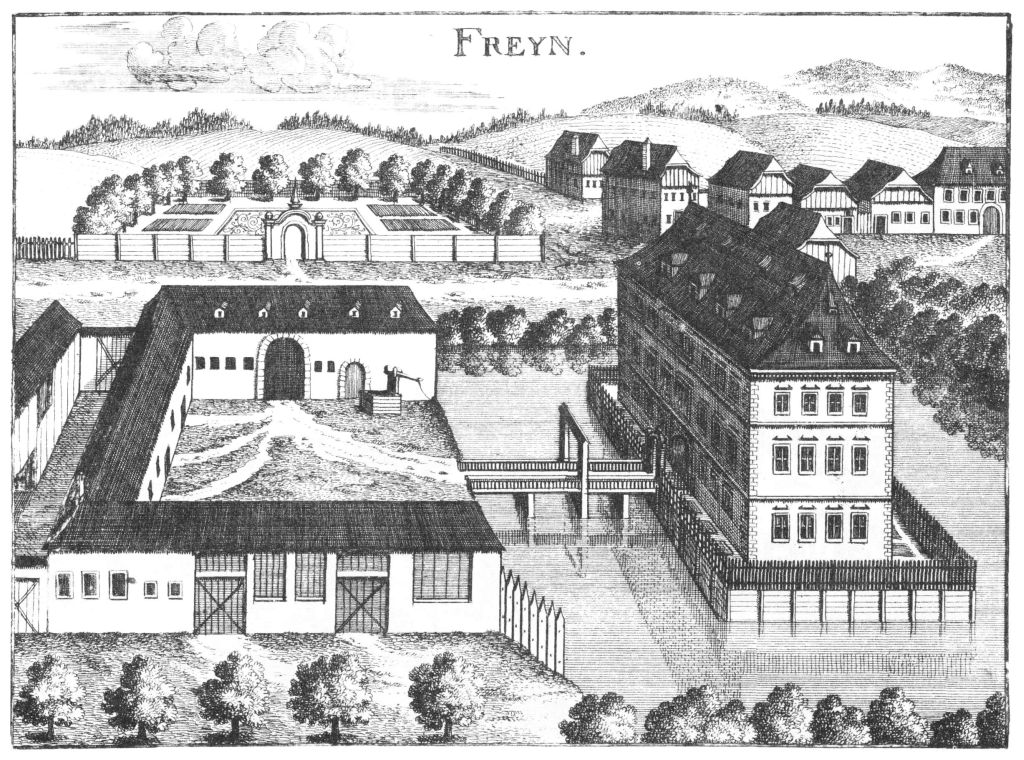
Frein Castle after an engraving by Georg Matthäus Vischer from 1674 Topographia Austriae superioris modernae

From 1850 onwards, Frein Castle was the administrative center for the diverse tasks of the large-scale economic enterprise Schaup or Lilienau. During and shortly after the Second World War, the castle provided accommodation for refugees from the countries of the former Austro-Hungarian Monarchy. During this period, the premises also housed a school with two classes, which, however, was abandoned in 1950. It was also used as a seat for administrations, including the Frankenburg forestry and estate administration and the archives of the Frankenburg local history society. In the years 1965/1966 renovation work was carried out on the castle.

The owner and lord of the castle, Christian Limbeck-Lilienau, who lives in Vienna, brought the castle into the headlines in 2007, as he granted the refugee family Zogaj free accommodation in the building.

In the fall of 2017, Christian Limbeck-Lilienau, as a descendant by marriage and heir to the Schaup dynasty, sold the property to Green Finance GmbH. With the takeover of the property, Green Finance renovated the listed castle jewel in spring 2018 according to the highest quality standards, in order to provide modern and contemporary living in a stylish ambience. During the general refurbishment, the main focus was on sustainability and, in cooperation with the heritage office, eight large family apartments and four offices were built in the castle.

== Architecture ==
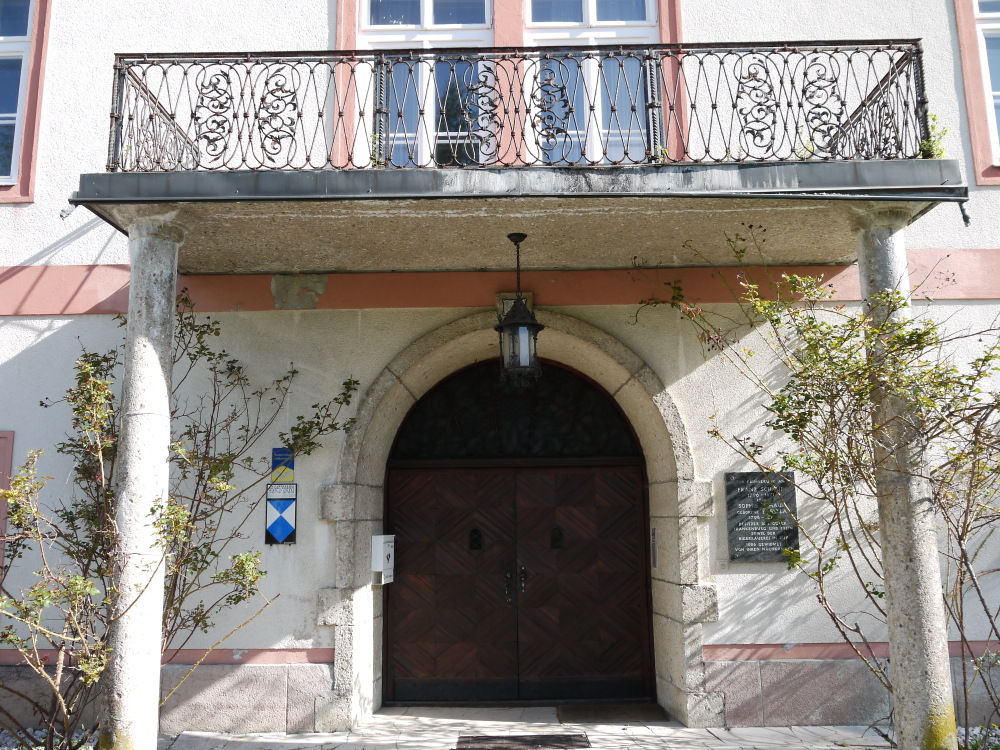
Entrance to the castle

Frein Castle is a three-storey building with a high hipped roof, built on a rectangular ground plan. Originally, Frein was a moated castle, but its moat was filled in on the access side and the street side. The present building dates back to the 16th and 17th centuries. On the rear side there is still a moat with water.

Access to the interior of the castle is provided by a round-arched granite portal. Above the portal there is a balcony resting on two columns, from which a double door leads to the interior. The wrought-iron balcony lattice is artistically executed. Above the gate axis there is a round gable with a clock and an attached turret. The facade is articulated with reddish flaps, while the windows are also framed in the same color.

== Literature ==
In the tale Nachkommenschaften of Adalbert Stifter, the castle is likely to be involved through Castle Firnberg.

== Nature ==
One of the largest bat colonies in Upper Austria lives in Schloss Frein in Frankenburg. Between 600 and 800 female mouse-eared bats spend the summer here and raise their young. The preservation of the roost is therefore of particular importance, as there is no suitable replacement in the wider area. During the renovation of the roof truss, careful attention was paid to preserving the breeding place of the bat colony - at the same time, comprehensive precautions were taken to guarantee a disturbance-free living experience for the tenants. The bats, which are under protection, are looked after by the Upper Austrian Nature Conservation Society.
