= Castle Frankenburg =

Castle in Austria

- Feste Frankenburg
- Frankenburg am Hausruck, Austria
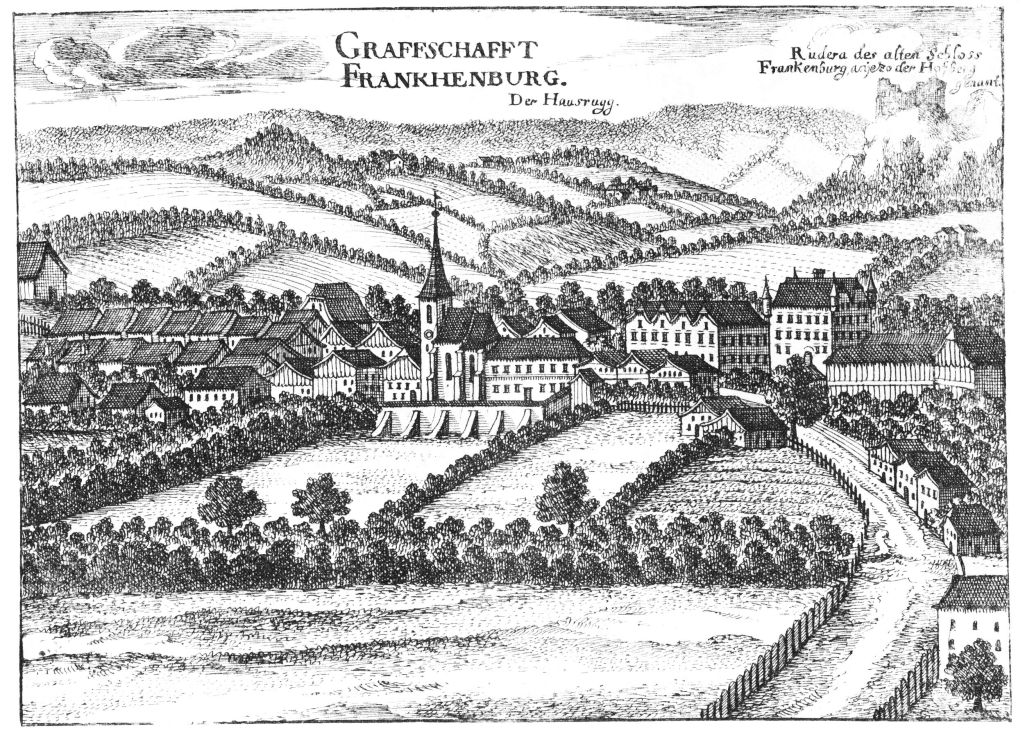
- Frankenburg (in ruins depicted on the top right corner) after an engraving by Georg Matthäus Vischer from 1674 "Topographia Austriae superioris modernae"

Site information
- Type: Castle

Location
- Coordinates: 48°5′9″N 13°30′2″E

Site history
- Built: Unknown. First mentioned in documents dated 1160.

Castle Frankenburg, formerly known as Feste Frankenburg, in German, or Francoburgum Castrum, in Latin, is an abandoned hilltop castle in the municipality of Frankenburg am Hausruck in Upper Austria on the Hofberg hilltop, formerly Am Vogl. It was first mentioned in a document in 1160 and abandoned as an administrative centre in 1511. The area is used for hiking, with the 'Hofberghütte' on the site of the former castle serving as a vantage point.

== Location ==
Frankenburg was located on the Upper Austrian side of the old Bavarian border. As the division of territory was not yet secure at the time, it is often counted as part of the Bavarian territory in historical accounts. In addition to protecting the citizens, the aim was also to secure the border to the north.

The castle was built on a plateau at an altitude of around 723 metres. The former cemetery is also located on the Hofberg. Over the course of time, human remains were found in various places during excavations. No ruins are recognisable on the surface today. After it was abandoned, it served as a source of stone for the local population. In the 16th century, fires were even lit to make it easier to obtain building materials. The high proportion of wood was also partly responsible for the severe decay.

== History ==
The first medieval estate was built in the area of the village church, but no traces of it can be found today. The subsequent building was erected on the Hofberg, where archaeological excavations (2003 and 2005) brought fragments of the wall to light. Today's market town of Frankenburg was still known as Zwispallen at the time. There is also evidence of Celtic graves in the vicinity of the castle. These suggest the existence of a previous, even older castle complex.

In the course of the settlement of the area around Zwispallen, the need for defences arose. The first Frankish immigrants cleared the wooded Hofberg. The surrounding settlements had various functions, which can also be seen in their names, e.g. Pehigen (formerly also Bechigen, from Pechsieder) or Badstuben. The local settlers built the defences themselves. In the second half of the 11th century, Rappoto von Julbach was commissioned by the nobility to complete the Frankenburg fortress. This is why Frankenburg Castle was very similar to the castle in Julbach. The builders continued the work of the settlers with stone. The Frankenburg was largely made of wood, but finds show that it was not completely wooden.

During the first expansion phase, the people of Julbach forced the unfree peasants around the Frankenburg castle to perform bonded labour. The region belonged to the bishopric of Bamberg (Bavaria), which disapproved of the exploitation of the settlers' property. Their aim was to run the forestry in Frankenburg.

Frankenburg Castle was later extended from a purely defensive castle to an administrative castle (Vogteiburg). Some of the additional buildings were also constructed with bricks. The building was completed under Otto I in the 12th century. In a letters patent, Emperor Frederick Barbarossa officially confirmed the 'fortress' of Frankenburg and its goods to his successor. With this confirmation, the castle could also be lent, pledged or given away. The emperor's demand in the same document that he be given a say in the allocation of bailiwicks also increased the political significance of the castle. On 15 February 1160, the fortress is also referred to as Francoburgum castrum for the first time.

A decade later (1170), Engelschalk von Reit handed over Zwispallen and with it the castle to Asbach Abbey. Until 1438, Frankenburg was nevertheless subject to the supreme authority of the Bamberg diocese. The monastery was also the owner of various estates, which had to pay taxes. Such donations were intended to pave the way for the founders into the afterlife.

In 1581, Emperor Rudolf II granted his envoy in Madrid, Hans Khevenhüller, the dominions of Frankenburg (with the then still intact seat of Frankenburg Castle) and Frein Castle, as well as the dominions of Kogl Castle (where the Khevenhüllers built Kogl Castle in 1750) and Kammer Castle, which were united to form the 'County of Frankenburg' in 1593.

== Ruins ==
Remains of the wall were found at the front, but they are too thin to have been part of the tower. During the excavation at the beginning of the 21st century, many everyday objects were found. These included piles of medieval nails, which indicate the presence of wooden structures at this location.

During excavations in 2007, a brick with the fingerprints of a labourer was also found. Investigations show that the man, who was about 156 cm tall, was right-handed. The searchers also unearthed fragments of pottery, almost half of which were made of light-coloured pottery known as 'Hausruck pottery'. Some of the ceramics are stamped or have border motifs, and some bear wheel crosses, an early form of marking ceramic ware. This light-coloured pottery is rather rare in contrast to the dark-coloured pottery.

One special find was a ceramic mouthpiece made of light-coloured clay. Instruments of this type are not usually preserved, but this broken piece can still be used to elicit sounds today.

Collections of old oven tiles were found in two different places, including one decorated with a winged griffin from the 15th century, together with charred animal bones. These ovens were either used as a cooking area or the castle inhabitants threw rubbish into the fire. However, the tiles were not made to a high standard, they are very coarse-grained. Furthermore, part of a brick floor was found above a thick layer of fire debris. The traces of fire are evidence of various fires in the castle, which affected all parts.

== Reconstruction of the plant ==
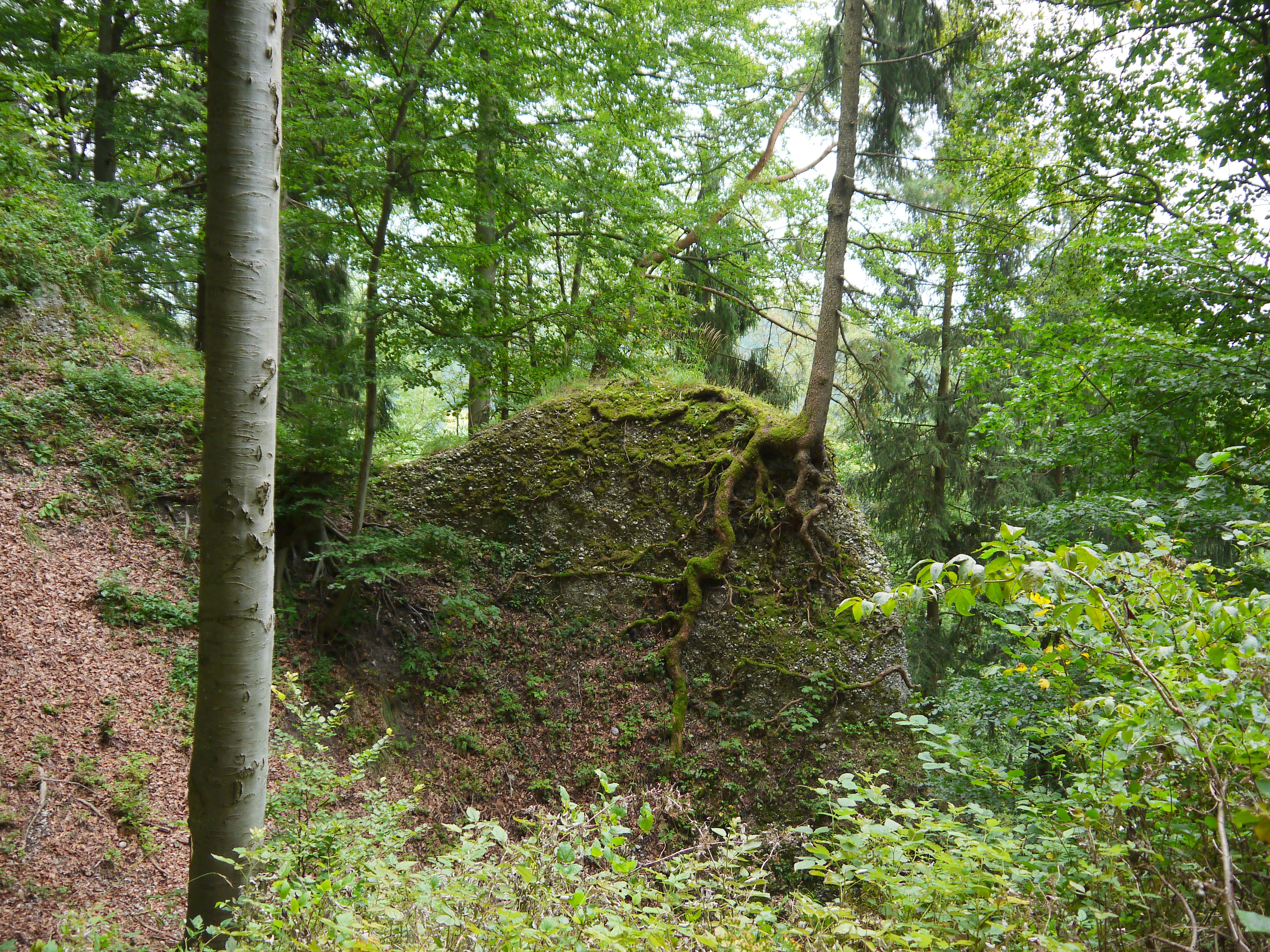
Castle's stable ruins on the Hofberg hilltop.

The castle measured 302 metres from north to south, of which the castle plateau and outer bailey accounted for around 150 metres. The main castle was 74 metres long and a maximum of 32 metres wide. The path up the Hofberg, which is still used today (for agricultural purposes), leads to the historic entrance. This was followed by two ramparts that could be passed through gates. The ramparts were a maximum of six metres high. A small square was then reached, from which the first moat could be crossed via a bridge. Those seeking entry then reached the outer bailey. The main bridge led over the main moat to the main castle. Today's ground structure still clearly shows the plateaus and moats. The remains of the outer wall have been preserved; it was around 120 cm thick. The inner walls, on the other hand, were only around 37 cm thick. Remains of a defence wall are also still present. The keep was completely demolished towards the end of the Middle Ages. However, a surface measurement revealed an original size of around 9 × 9 metres. A painting in Hochosterwitz Castle clearly shows the old tower. It can be seen that it consisted of at least two upper storeys, which corresponds to a height of 25 to 30 metres.

The reconstruction was based on old paintings, ground measurements and excavations. An extensive archaeological excavation would probably provide more precise information, but is currently (2010) not feasible.
