= Frankenburger Würfelspiel =

1936 multi-disciplinary open-air drama

The Frankenburger Würfelspiel (Frankenburg Dice Game) is a Thingspiel (a Nazi-era multi-disciplinary open-air drama) by Eberhard Wolfgang Möller based on the historical event of the same name in Frankenburg am Hausruck, Upper Austria. It received its première in Berlin in association with the 1936 Summer Olympics and the inauguration of the Dietrich-Eckart-Bühne, the Berlin Thingstätte which is now the Waldbühne (Forest Stage), and was the most successful Thingspiel.

This Thingspiel has nothing in common with the Frankenburg play and re-enactement started in 1925, and still running, of the dramatic event that counts with more than 400 amateur actors - among them numerous descendants of those convicted at the time, which has become one of the cultural and touristic attraction of Frankenburg am Hausruck market town.

== Background ==
In May 1625, during the Counter-Reformation, Baron von Herberstorff, Governor of Upper Austria and acting on behalf of the Holy Roman Emperor Ferdinand II, tried to forcibly reintroduce Catholicism in Frankenburg. The Lutheran peasants resisted, so he made 36 men roll dice against each other in pairs for their lives; the losers were hanged. The incident touched off a peasants' revolt in Upper Austria, the last Peasants' War. Möller's work based on the event was the only drama of the Third Reich which was written as a ministerial commission; Möller, who was a theorist of the Thingspiel movement, was asked by the Olympic Committee to write a play for the inauguration of the Dietrich-Eckart-Bühne (the Berlin Thingstätte named for Dietrich Eckart) at the upcoming Berlin Olympics, and from the ideas he submitted, Propaganda Minister Joseph Goebbels chose the Frankenburg story. Möller said that "he felt [the Frankenburg event] called from beyond the grave for [judgement]," and that in writing the drama about it he used as models: "in addition to Orestes, Ludus de Antichristo, and a few mystery plays, George Kaiser's expressionist play Die Bürger von Calais (The Citizens of Calais) and Stravinsky's Ödipus Rex (Oedipus Rex)."

== Plot, staging and message ==
The Frankenburger Würfelspiel consists of ten scenes with a prologue and an epilogue and constitutes a trial—as in the ancient Germanic Thing—of Baron von Hebersdorf, Emperor Ferdinand II, Duke Maximilian of Bavaria, the Catholic clerics who advised them, and their subordinates for the devastation of the Thirty Years' War and the harm done to the people, including the murders at Frankenburg. It takes place on a three-level stage, with seven judges on the uppermost tier, the emperor and his advisors in the middle, and von Hebersdorf and the peasants on the lowest level. A chorus illuminates the significance of events and is told to "sing . . . after the manner of choruses in oratorios." (The work also uses a peasant chorus and some choral responses by the characters.) The music is to be "functional" and to include fanfares and alarm bells. Processions of people and riders "underscore the popular character" of the work.

The prologue, spoken by a narrator on the middle level, presents the play as "a parable that obligates"; the audience is the ultimate judge. When von Herbersdorf orders the peasants to appear and has the selected 36 roll the dice to determine whether they live or die, they declare that they will be martyrs: "We will be flags that never rend . . . The future will one day catch fire from us." But the crowd demands them back, becomes one people (Volk) and frees itself from the tyrants' yoke. Hitler Youth columns with flags waving appeared as the play became an allegorical "consecration" of Hitler's seizure of power. Von Hebersdorf tries to use force, but is stopped by the appearance of a knight in black armour, who takes the dice and forces all the rulers to roll them; against them on behalf of justice, he throws infinity, and the judges condemn them as "disloyal and [dishonourable] servants of the people." Ferdinand is sentenced to eternal damnation, Maximilian cursed, the clerics expelled without possibility of pardon from the world and from God's grace, and von Herbersdorf, who betrayed the trust of the Volk, is to be buried in the knacker's yard.

The play expresses Möller's concept of justice as wielded by God; for him, "the spirit and the essence of the Thingspiel" was the chorale praising God, "O Gott, wie bist du wunderbar", and the message of the work is moral and Christian: "Act justly, for one day you will be judged!" It is also a Nazi work. The epilogue clearly relates the events to the new Germany: "Look: across the land and the bloody fields a new race is greening, invincible and great". The Prologue states that the play is intended for performance "Zum hohen Ruhme Gottes und im Namen des Volkes der Deutschen" (to the great glory of God and in the name of the Volk of the Germans).

Möller wrote the play with "elementary simplicity in language, [characterisation] and action" appropriate to its essence as a morality play and also to the huge venue for which it was written. He hoped it would be the first complete Thingspiel, in which the various dramatic resources of the medium were successfully synthesised.

== Première ==
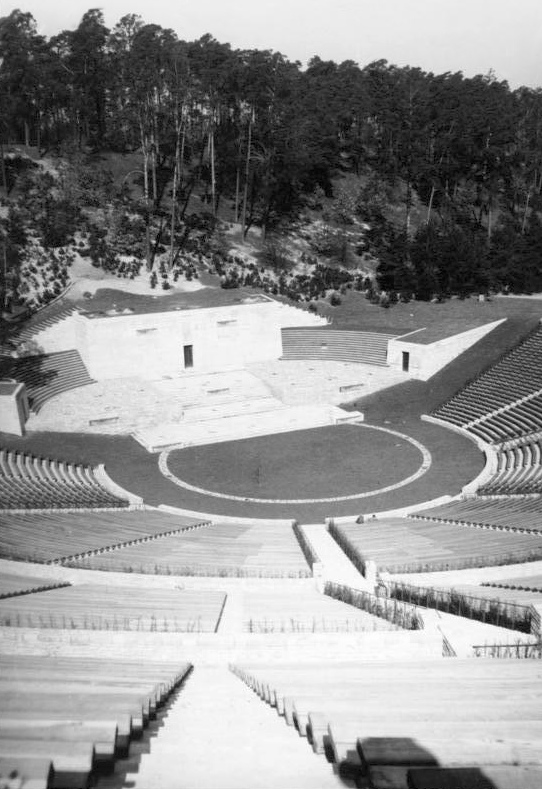
Dietrich-Eckart-Bühne photographed in 1939

The play received its première on August 2, 1936, the day after the opening of the Olympics, at the nearby Dietrich-Eckart-Bühne; it was the inaugural performance for the facility. The audience was 20,000 people; the performance was directed by Werner Pleister and Mathias Wieman (who also played the Black Knight). The Reich Labour Service supplied 1,200 extras.

Möller had originally intended Hitler himself to be the highest judge at this first performance of the play, a spotlight picking him out after the peasants asked, "Is there no righteous man [who] . . . will put an end to this violent charade?", but he was otherwise engaged; "reality had overtaken the [theatre]". In his 2007 book on Nazi drama, Gerwin Strobl points out that he had in fact started to walk from the Olympic Stadium to attend the performance, but turned around halfway and got into his car; in Strobl's opinion, because of the inflammatory political implications of the play in light of the Nazi attempted coup in Austria two years before, in which Chancellor Dollfuss had been assassinated.

== Reception ==
The Nazi Der Angriff praised the performance as a "miraculous hour in the history of the [theatre]", and the Völkischer Beobachter also praised it and the playwright: "Eberhard Wolfgang Möller, the boldest champion of the coming form among the creative spirits of the young generation, has mastered an unprecedented task." Ferdinand Junghans-Busch, in comments printed in the 1937 edition of the play, wrote that the action on the highest stage level, that of the judges and the Black Knight, truly exemplified "judicial strength, the voice of the people and the expression that we Germans conceive as Führer." However, the Amt Rosenberg considered it too Christian, and the Catholic Germania regarded it as anti-Catholic.

The work was performed at many other Thingstätten and in theatres. It was the high point of the Thingspiel movement. In his overview of National Socialist literature and film, Karl-Heinz Schoeps calls it "the high point, and at the same time the endpoint". Glen W. Gadberry, evaluating the work in 1977, urged that it be re-examined because of its valid message that we will all be judged—as the Nazis were at the Nuremberg trials—and quotes a review of the première which makes that point: the Frankenburger Würfelspiel "gives us all, [we] people who today sit in judgement of the past, the warning that at some point a later time will judge our deeds". Strobl, however, while recognising Möller's "cultural ambitions", sees this as "ill-disguised propaganda" against Austria, with the role of Bavaria downplayed and the behind-the-scenes influence of the Pope standing for Mussolini's siding with Dollfuss against Nazi influence in Austria. He points out that the subsequent performances included explicitly propagandistic uses; for example in 1937, the mayor of Passau ordered a performance "as a treat for our ethnic kin beyond the border [in Austria]".
