= Frankenburger Bratknödel =

Austrian dumpling

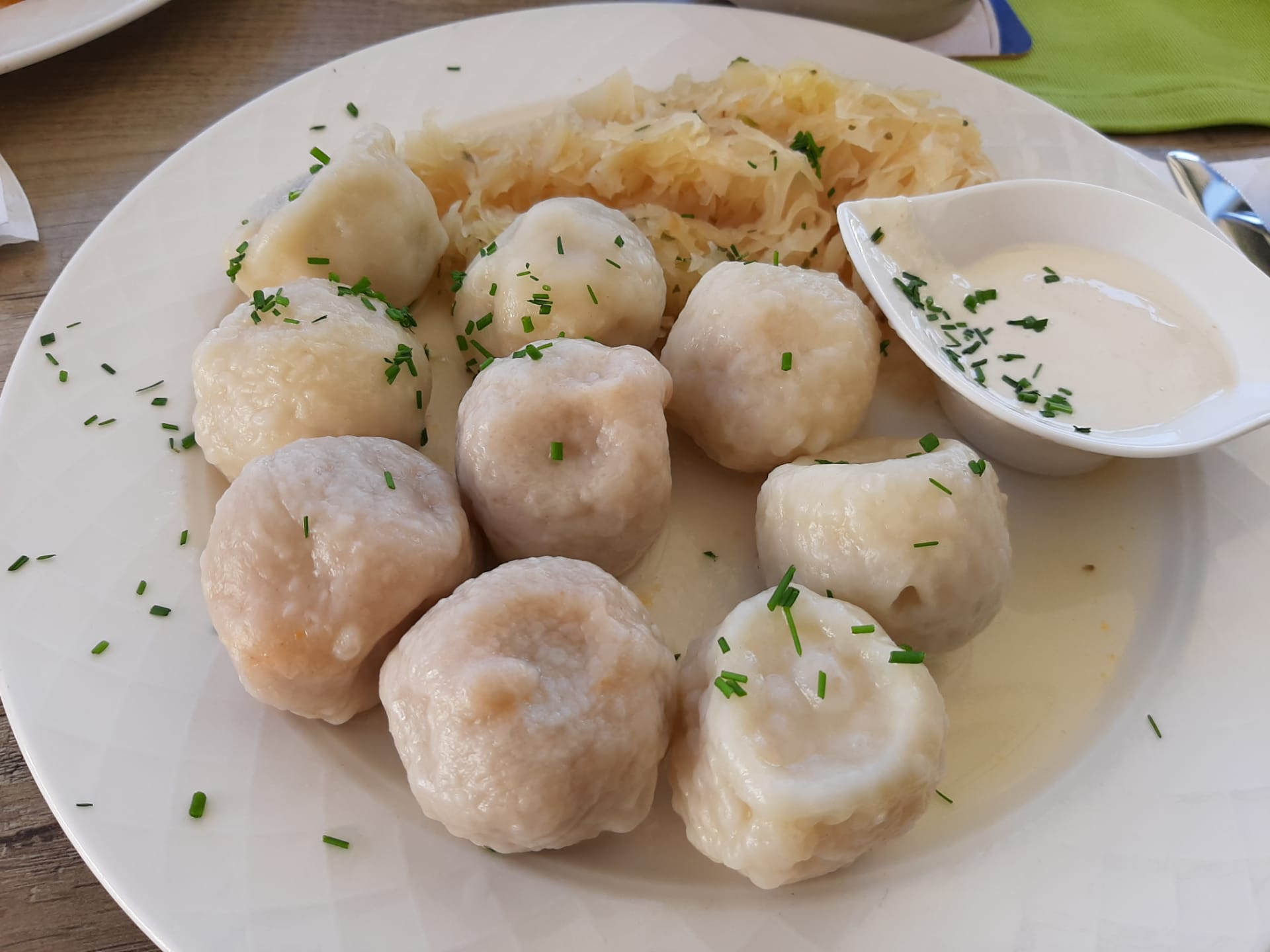
- Typical serving of frankenburger bratknödel
- Alternative names: Fraungabuaga Bratknedl
- Type: Knödel
- Course: Main course
- Place of origin: Austria
- Region or state: Frankenburg am Hausruck, Upper Austria
- Main ingredients: Minced meat (pork), paprika powder, onion, garlic, pork fat

Frankenburger Bratknödel (Central Bavarian: Fraungabuaga Bratknedl), is an Austrian specialty of knödel unique to the municipality of Frankenburg am Hausruck, in Upper Austria.

== Preparation ==
=== Filling ===
The filling is made by combining diced onion and garlic with mince and core fat, all seasoned with paprika powder, parsley, salt and pepper. Once all ingredients are mixed, small balls are formed.

Core fat is an Austrian term used to describe various animal products from the fatty tissue of domestic cattle. Generally, this refers to beef kidney fat as slaughter fat, but the term also covers intestinal fat and lung fat.

=== Dough ===
The dough that will envelop the filling is kneaded from flour, water, egg, salt and oil until smooth. Then the dough is rolled and separated into nut-sized pieces and flattened to receive the stuffing, which is to be wrapped into a dumpling.

Once all dumplings are formed, these will be simmered for about 10 minutes in water that has been brought to a boiled and salted. Once cooked the knödel are drained and served with sauerkraut, creamed horseradish and fresh chives.

== Sauce ==
The sauce accompanying the knödel is made with grated Styrian kren, mixed with sour cream, vinegar, salt, and chives.
