= Stefan Fadinger =

Austrian leader of peasant revolt

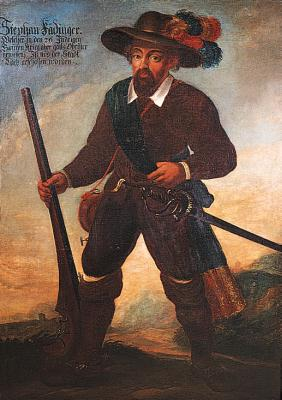
- painting of Fadinger
- Born: c. 1585
- Died: 5 July 1626; Linz, Upper Austria
- Known for: Leader of the peasants during the Peasants' War in Upper Austria
- Children: 2

Stefan Fadinger was an Austrian farmer who, along with his brother-in-law, Christoph Zeller, was the leader of the peasants during the Peasants' War in Upper Austria. A Protestant, Fadinger opposed his Catholic Bavarian overlords, and after Adam Von Herberstorff played a "dice game" wherein many were hanged, he planned a revolt. Once the revolt began earlier than he expected ( after a brawl with Bavarian soldiers in Lembach), he and Zeller led the rebels to defeat the Bavarians and lay siege to Linz. During the Siege Fadinger was wounded in the chest on 28 June 1626 and died six days later on 5 July. After Zellers death on 18 July the Rebel leadership was crippled and the revolt was crushed by November 1626.

== History ==
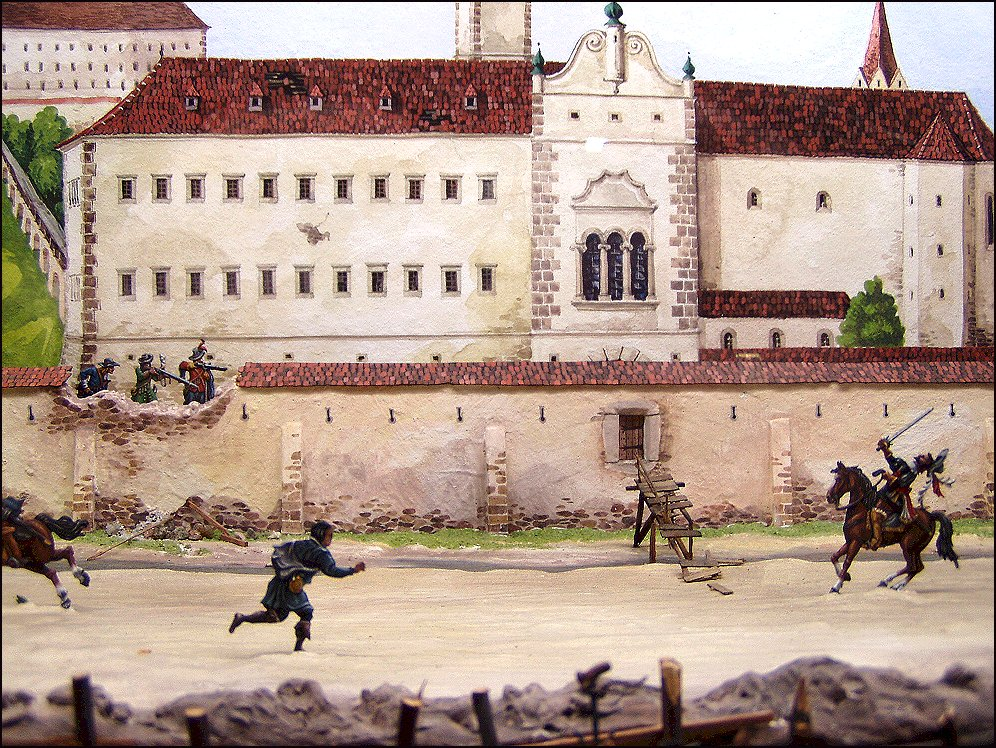
Painting of Fadinger getting shot

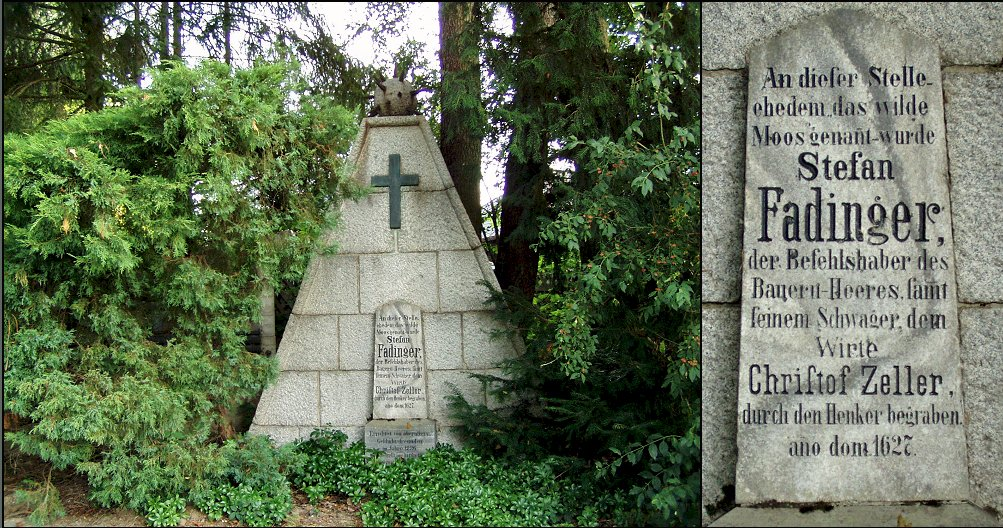
Fadinger's tomb

Fadinger was born around 1585 and was a wealthy farmer. In 1616 he took over his farm from his father. He had a wife and two children, who were forced to flee after the revolt was crushed.

After Bavarian and Rebel soldiers had a skirmish at Lembach, the revolt began. Fadinger began to rally support for the Protestant cause. Eventually, he was made leader of the Rebel cause, though he was somewhat overwhelmed by the position. He was supposedly a good speaker who was able to rally support for the Rebel cause, however, when this was combined with his celebration after the victory at Peuerbach, it worsened the cause.

Despite being a charismatic speaker, Fadinger had little experience as a tactician, and was not particularly prepared to be the leader of the rebels. Rather than leading the army himself, he instead relied on "those which can make decisions more easily." Though Zeller successfully led the army to victory at Peuerbach, but he and Fadinger made a mistake when they went around attempting to gain more support for the revolt rather than pursuing Herberstorff, which allowed Herberstorff to fortify Linz.

On 28 June, Fadinger was riding around the city walls on a horse when he was spotted by Bavarian soldiers, and he was shot and fatally wounded. Fadinger died of his injuries on 5 July 1626, and ten days later, Zeller also died, thus leaving the Rebels without an effective leader, which heavily contributed to their defeat in later 1626.

== Sources ==
- Wilson, Peter H. (2009). Europe's Tragedy: A History of the Thirty Years War. Allen Lane. ISBN 978-0-7139-9592-3.
