= Upper Austrian peasant war of 1626 =

Military conflict

Upper Austrian peasant war
- Part of The Thirty Years' War
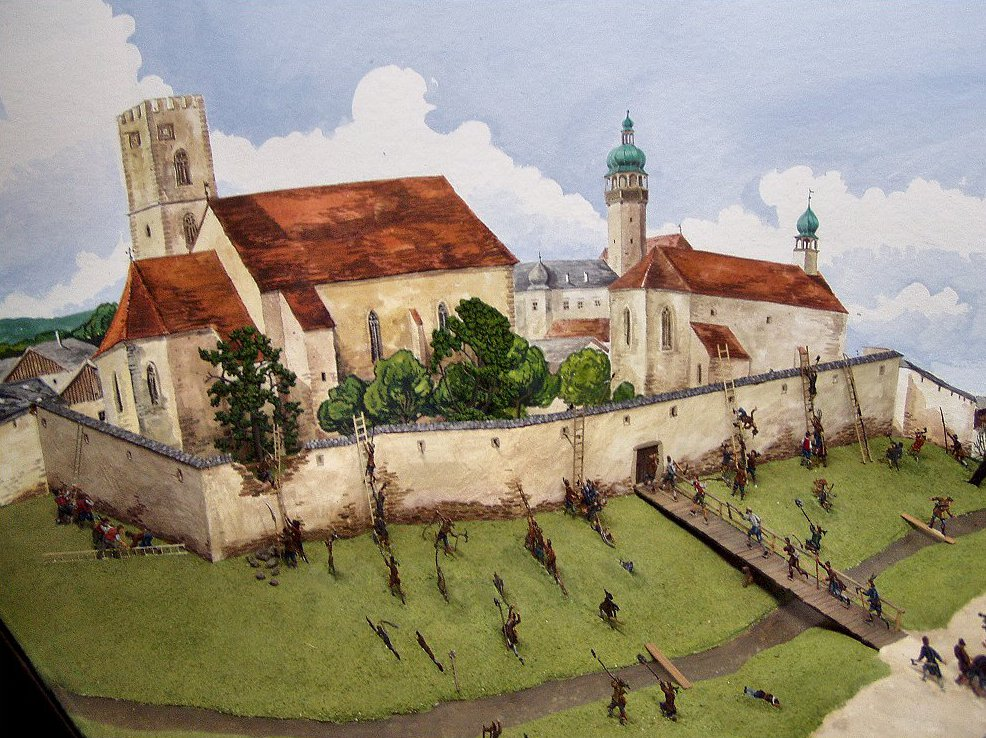
- Model of Peasant rebels attacking the Peuerbach stronghold
Date	May – December 1626; 400 years ago
Location	Upper Austria, Holy Roman Empire
Result	Imperial victory

Belligerents
(Upper Austria) Upper Austrian Rebels	Holy Roman Empire (Electorate of Bavaria) Bavaria

Commanders and leaders
(Upper Austria) Stefan Fadinger (DOW) (Upper Austria) Christoph Zeller † (Upper Austria) Achaz Wiellinger (Upper Austria) Martin Aichinger (executed)	(Electorate of Bavaria) Adam Von Herberstorf (Holy Roman Empire) Gottfried zu Pappenheim

Strength
c. 40,000	40,000+

Casualties and losses
12,000+	10,000+

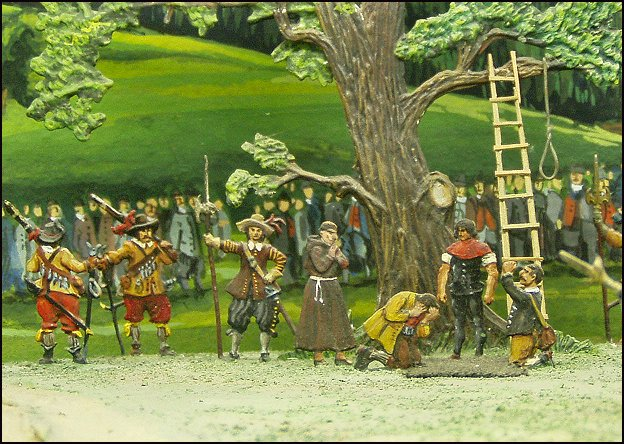
Frankenburger Würfelspiel – two men are forced to play for their life, throwing the dice.

The Upper Austrian peasant war (German: Oberösterreichischer Bauernkrieg) of 1626 was a rebellion led by farmers whose goal was to free Upper Austria from Bavarian rule. The motive (found in the Frankenburger Würfelspiel of 1625) was an escalation of the Bavarian Electorate's attempt to press the country into the Catholic faith at the time of the Thirty Years' War.

== History ==
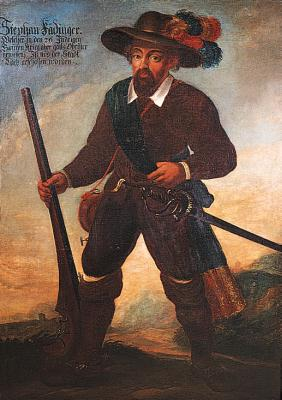
Stefan Fadinger, elected high commissioner of the Traunviertel and Hausruckviertel districts, and the supreme commander of the rebel army

In the beginning of the Thirty Years' War, Upper Austria was pledged to the Bavarian Electorate by the House of Habsburg. The new ruler assumed cuius regio, eius religio (the religion of the ruler dictated the religion of the ruled) and tried to convert the lands to the Catholic faith. In May 1625, the Protestant priest of the Frankenburg am Hausruck parish was replaced by a Catholic priest sent from Bavaria. After an armed uprising, the new priest was forced to flee from the castle. However, the men feared the reaction from Bavaria and surrendered three days later. Adam von Herberstorff, the Bavarian steward of Upper Austria, called all of the men from the region to the Haushamerfeld near Frankenburg to hold the assizes. The 36 men who had led the revolt were among the 5,000 gathered. The court sentenced the men to death, but allowed half of them to go free. Two men would step forward, and one would hang while the other would go. A roll of the dice determined their fate.

The steward had thought that the harsh sentence would frighten the peasants, but it only served to increase dissent and give sympathy to the rebels. Over the next year, the peasants secretly prepared for war by recruiting a man from every farmer's house, supplying them with weapons, and teaching them tactics. They intended to attack on the Pentecost, but war had broken out two weeks earlier, when Bavarian soldiers tried to steal a horse in Lembach im Mühlkreis. In response, a number of peasants on a pilgrimage near Lembach quickly assembled to slaughter the Bavarian garrison of 25 men. The group continued to collect more recruits on their way to Peuerbach, where they faced Herberstorff and his men. Even before the full size of the peasant army was assembled in Peuerbach, a number of companies attacked them and were quickly defeated. The new commissioners of the region were elected summarily on the battlefield.

The 5,000-strong peasant army went on to besiege Eferding, Wels, Kremsmünster, and Steyr, finally arriving at Linz, which did not surrender despite being defended by only 150 Bavarian soldiers. During the siege of Linz, the rebel leader, Stefan Fadinger, was shot. He died on July 5, two weeks after the fatal gunshot. It took months for Bavaria to send troops under Pappenheim's command to relieve the town at the end of August. Steyr was won back on September 26, and Wels on September 27. The war went on until the onset of winter, leaving the countryside destroyed. The farmers were now required to feed the 12,000 Bavarian soldiers who were spending winter in the country. Most of the leaders of the revolt were decapitated over the following months.

== Reception ==
Upper Austria had been rebellious for centuries, with 62 known uprisings between 1356 and 1849, 14 of which occurred in the 16th century. However, the Peasants' War of 1626 was the costliest in terms of human life and damage to livestock and property. The war caused Martin Aichinger to lose his farm and begin roaming the country. He eventually became a religious leader who led a popular revolt against aristocratic rule. His revolutionary ideas frightened the rulers so much that they tried to arrest him, leading to another series of uprisings that ended in the Battle on the Frankenberg (German "Schlacht auf dem Frankenberg") in 1636. All of Aichinger's followers were slaughtered during the battle, including the remaining women and children who had been in hiding.
