= Austria-Forum =

Online reference work about Austria

- Website type: Online database of Austrian culture
- Available in: German, partly also English
- Website: austria-forum.org | NID-Library
- Commercial: No
- Current status: Active

Austria-Forum is a freely accessible online collection of reference works on Austria in German, with some articles in English, initiated by TU Graz. As of 2022, Austria-Forum has been integrated with NID-Library (Netinteractive Document Library).

== Background ==
AEIOU logo

The predecessor of Austria-Forum, the AEIOU project was launched in 1996 by the Austrian Federal Ministry for Science and Research as part of Austria's millennial celebrations. The first mention of the name Ostarrîchi, or Austria was in the year 996. The content was based on the German-language Österreich-Lexikon, first published in a printed version in 1995. Additional material has been acquired, including additional images and audio and video files, allowing AEIOU to grow into one of the first multimedia information systems pertaining to Austrian history, culture and politics.

The title AEIOU—the "Annotatable Electronic Interactive Oesterreich Universal Information System"—is an allusion to the old Habsburg motto, A.E.I.O.U. Suggestions for the improvements to articles can be made by reader; however, the aeiou Encyclopedia was not a wiki.

== Scope ==
Austria-Forum merged with a new technology, "Netinteractive Documents", which allows published texts to be annotated by readers, in NID-Library.com. The scope remains on issues of Austrian concern in a broad sense and includes open access versions of some key Austriaca publications, including historical primary texts, by e.g. Franz Grillparzer, Gerald Szyszkowitz, or Ödön von Horvath. The collection includes recent secondary sources on Austriaca, such as Ute Degener's 2022 academic study on Elfriede Jelinek's aesthetics, Stefan Dollinger's 2021 monograph on Standard Austrian German, or Kurt Ifkovitz's 2018 edition of Hermann Bahr's correspondence with Arthur Schnitzler, 1891-1931.

== See also ==
- List of online encyclopedias
