= Eberhard Wolfgang Möller =

German dramatist and poet

Eberhard Wolfgang Möller (6 January 1906 – 1 January 1972) was a German dramatist and poet.

== Biography ==
Möller was born on 6 January 1906 in Berlin. His first two published works appeared in 1929, the First World War drama Douaumont, and Kalifornische Tragödie. In 1930, he published Panamaskandal, which called for national renewal, denouncing the Weimar Republic.

In 1931, he became a member of the Nazi Party, thus beginning his career as a National Socialist author and cultural official. In 1934, he was employed as a theatre critic in the Theatre Division of the Reich Propaganda Ministry.

Rothschild siegt bei Waterloo, Möller's most successful stage production, was written in 1934. It was an antisemitic comedy set in the Napoleonic era. During the war, he was involved in writing the screenplay for the antisemitic film Jud Süss (1940). The film had initially been suggested by scriptwriter Ludwig Metzger, but Möller was brought in to help in 1939. Although he had no experience in screenwriting, he was considered ideologically reliable.

Another work was Frankenburger Würfelspiel (Frankenburg Dice Game), a Thingspiel (multi-disciplinary open-air drama), set in the seventeenth century, which had its première at the 1936 Berlin Olympic Games.

== Themes ==
Möller's works were diverse in terms of historical setting, extending from the Roman Republic (Der Untergang Karthagos, 1938) to the Great War (Douaumont, 1929). However, they all shared the theme of heroism, as well as reflecting his hatred of Jews, capitalism and modernity.

== Bibliography ==
- Baird, Jay W., 'Hitler's muse: The political aesthetics of the poet and playwright Eberhard Wolfgang Möller", German Studies Review, 17 (1994)
- Cadigan, Rufus J., "Eberhard Wolfgang Möller: Politically correct playwright of the Third Reich", in Glen W. Gadberry (ed.), Theatre in the Third Reich, the Pre-War Years: Essays on Theatre in Nazi Germany
