= Russian cuisine =

Culinary traditions of Russia

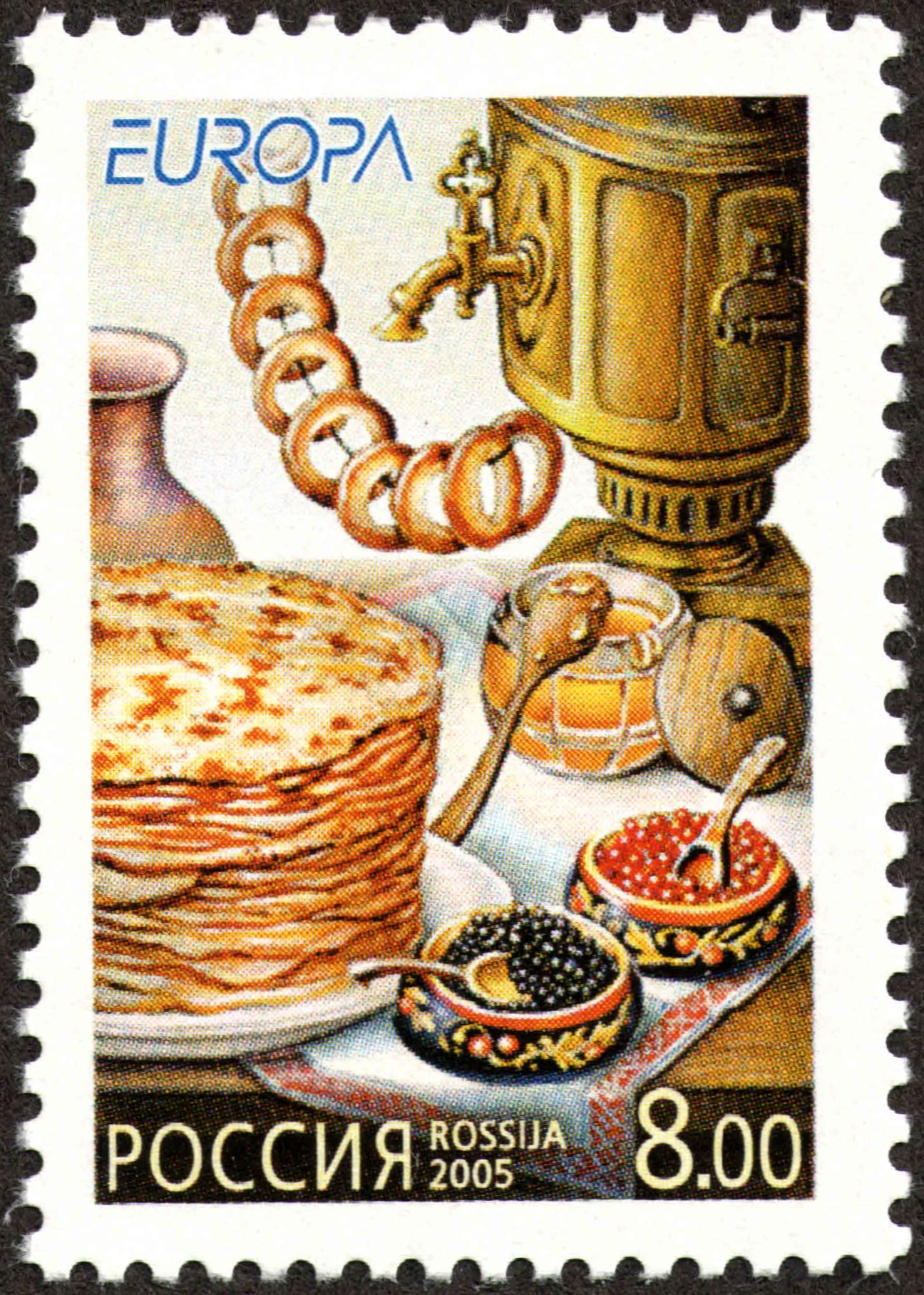
Russian postage stamp showing typical national specialties served in Russia: blini, caviar, bubliki, honey, and tea in a samovar.

Russian cuisine is a collection of the different dishes and cooking traditions of the Russian people as well as a list of culinary products popular in Russia, with most names being known since pre-Soviet times, coming from all kinds of social circles.

== History ==
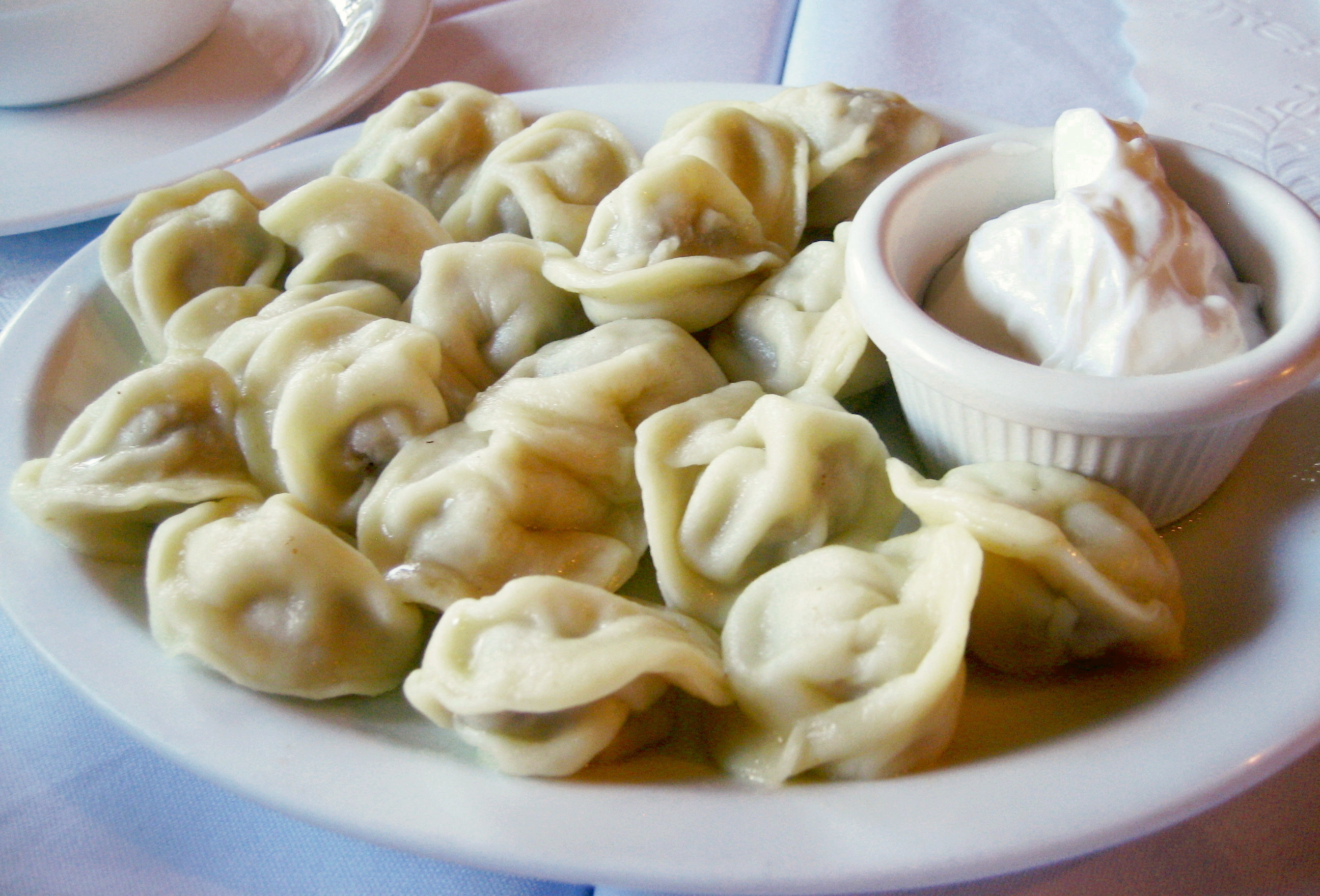
Pelmeni—boiled dumplings with meat filling

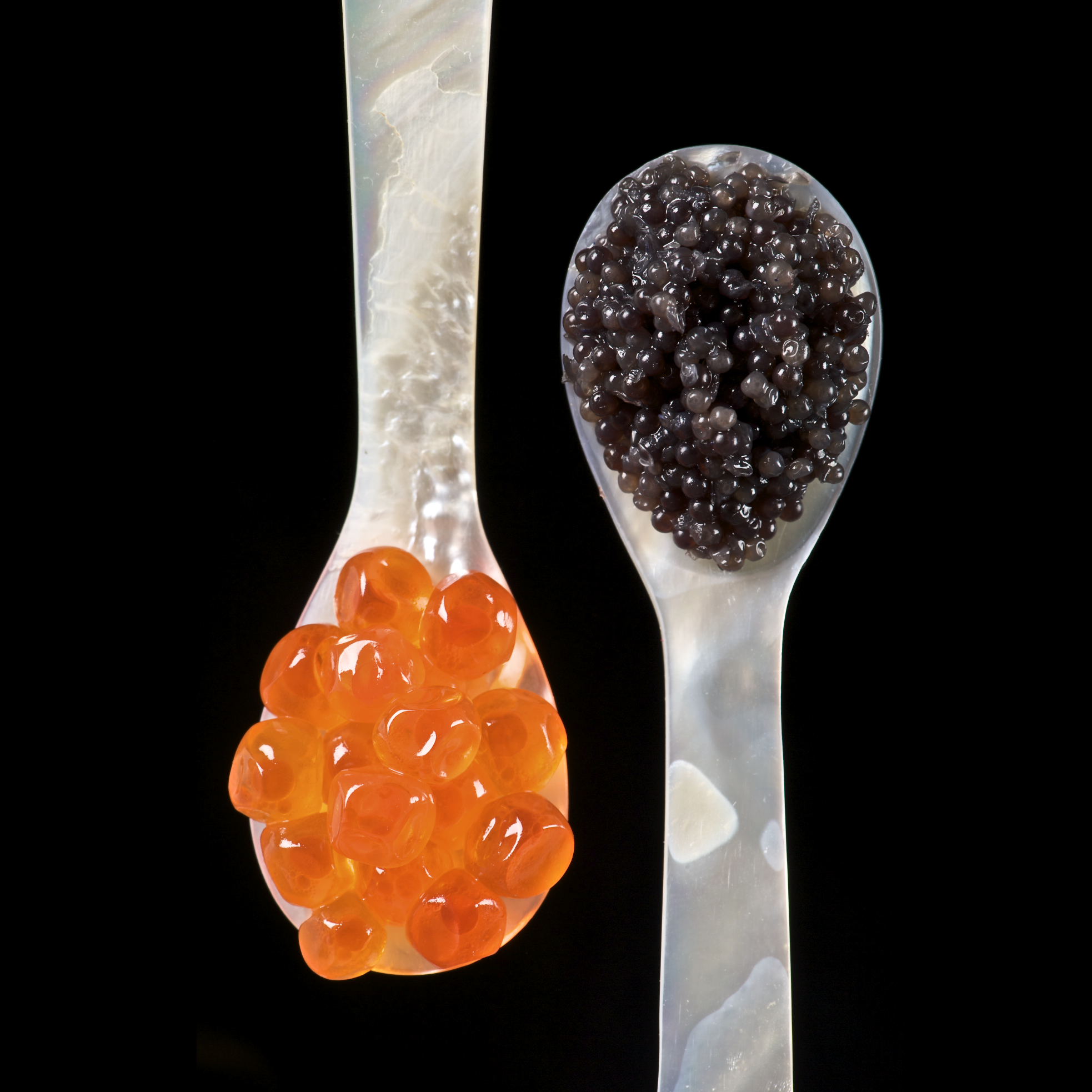
Caviar—a delicacy that is very popular in Russian culture

The history of Russian cuisine was divided in four groups: Old Russian cuisine (9th to 16th century), Old Moscow cuisine (17th century), the cuisine that existed during the ruling of Peter and Catherine the Great (18th century), and finally Petersburg cuisine, which took place from the end of the 18th century to the 1860s.

Its foundations were laid by the peasant food of the rural population in an often harsh climate, with a combination of plentiful fish, pork, poultry, caviar, mushrooms, berries, and honey. Crops of rye, wheat, barley and millet provided the ingredients for a plethora of breads, pancakes, pies, cereals, beer and vodka. Soups and stews are centered on seasonal or storable produce, fish and meats. Such food remained the staple for the vast majority of Russians well into the 20th century.

In the Old Russian period, the main food groups were bread, grains, and other foods that contained starch. Women baked pies with many different fillings, such as mushrooms or berries. During gatherings, a loaf of bread and salt was always present. Kasha, such as buckwheat and oats, were represented as wellbeing to the household. Many Russians used honey and berries and made them into gingerbread, which is still a popular Russian dessert. Some Russian dishes resulted from interactions with Asian cultures, such as lapsha.

While written recipes and descriptions of cuisine are scant in Russia until the 18th century, several monumental works from the 16th and 17th century provide some insight into the high cuisine of the time. One notable example is the Domostroy, which provides instruction for storing ingredients and serves as a reference for the meals consumed throughout the year for festivities and different seasons. Other notable works include "An Inventory of Dishes Served at the Tsar’s Table" from 1610-1613 (Russian: Роспись Царским кушаньям), written during the Time of Troubles, as well as recordings of dishes served to political and religious figures like Patriarch Filaret of Moscow. Several dishes recognizable to modern Russian cuisine already appear at this stage, such as: shchi and other soups, ukha, pirozhki and pirogi, lapsha, pastila, salted or dried meats and fish, dishes with tvorog, ikra, kurnik, buckwheat, kissel, blini and oladyi, roast pork, korovai, kalach, pickled fruits and vegetables, varenye, khvorost, kutya, kvass, mors, sbiten, and spit-roasted meats resembling modern shashlyk. The extensive use of offal to utilize every part of the animal is also present even among the wealthy, and remained so until relatively recently in Russian cuisine.

Many other dishes from the period were largely forgotten by the 19th century or following the Russian Revolution, the following being some notable examples:

- Kundyumy (кундюмы), a lenten dumpling dish with mushroom and grain filling, also called ushki (ушки) in later centuries
- Pirozhki karasiki (пирожки карасики), a fried turnover with meat or fish filling, resembling smaller modern chebureki
- Levashniki or nalivashniki (левашники или наливашники), a fried turnover with varenye filling
- Steamed fish (паровая рыба), which began to be cooked with a fish kettle in the 19th century
- Telnoye (тельное), pounded or minced seasoned fish, often with onions, that was once fried in a mold but later in the form of cutlets
- Kal'ya (калья), a piquant broth-based soup that incorporates pickle brine or lemon juice and sometimes caviar, considered a possible ancestor of rassolnik
- Botvinya (ботвинья), a cold soup with fragrant herbs, fish, vegetables, and kvass
- Mazunya (мазюня), a sweet spiced spread made with radishes
- The use of vyaziga (вязига), or dried sturgeon notochord
- Sour shchi (кислые щи), contrary to the name, does not denote a soup, but rather a highly carbonated drink similar to kvass

By the end of the stages of Old Russian and Moscow cuisine, native dishes were established and developing in complexity. Additional dishes like lapsha and dumplings were influenced by interactions with neighboring Steppe cultures, the period of Mongol and Turkic conquest over East slavic lands, and the subsequent Russian conquest of lands like the Khanate of Kazan and the Khanate of Astrakhan. As the Tsardom of Russia expanded its territory, fruits like grapes and watermelon start to appear more often on the tables of the elite, as well as ingredients and spices like saffron, ginger, mace and nutmeg, cinnamon, pepper, and cloves.

The 16th through 18th centuries brought more refined culinary techniques. It was during this time period that smoked meats and fish, pastry cooking, salads, and green vegetables, chocolate, ice cream, wines, and juice were imported from abroad. At least for the urban aristocracy and provincial gentry, this opened the doors for the creative integration of these new foodstuffs with traditional Russian dishes.

In the 18th to early 19th centuries, cuisine was separated based on economic class. The rich had meat and delicacies, while the poor had the most simple dishes. During the Peter and Catherine the Great era, Western culinary techniques, tastes, and terminology, especially French, begin to penetrate Russian high cuisine. Notable influences like Western-style hard cheeses, increased use of churned butter rather than the traditional clarified butter, complex sauces, as well as additional spices and herbs entered Russian cuisine. It is from these influences that several Russian dishes evolved, such as various kotlety, meatballs, soup with frikadelki (суп с фрикадельками), vinegret and other cold salads, buterbrod, julienne, sweet kissels, zefir, and various other confectionary and cakes.

This period also marks the beginning of the written Russian culinary tradition, with several recipe books for Russian cuisine beginning to be published from the late 18th century and onward. One of the first of such publications is Drukovtsev's Cooking Notes (Поваренные записки) from 1779, which also contains the oldest recorded beet borscht recipe in Russian cuisine. Other key authors of the 18th and early 19th century include Lyovshin, Osipov, Avdeyeva, and Gerasim Stepanov, among other known and anonymous authors. In addition to the aforementioned dishes, many other recognizable dishes of Russian cuisine appear in these works, including but not limited to green shchi, okroshka, pelmeni, kulebyaka, vatrushki, a variety of oladyi, including from tvorog (syrniki) and potatoes (draniki), blintzes with various fillings, varenets, millet kasha with pumpkin, pickled/preserved fruits and vegetables (cabbage, mushrooms, cucumbers, apples, watermelons, plums, lemons, barberries, capers, cherries, pears, etc.), paskha and kulich, and various kotlety from meat and lenten versions from rice and/or mushrooms.

These works also provide insight into the culinary systems of the day, which were always evolving. Lyovshin, for example, provides recipes for mushroom powders used to add umami to dishes, as well as spice mixes (травный порошок) used for seasoning most foods that used herbs (basil, thyme, lemon balm, tarragon, parsley, savory, celery leaves, hyssop, dill) and spices (white pepper, nutmeg, cubeb) both native and foreign. During this period, additional influences arrived from Westernization policies started by Peter the Great and the annexation of neighboring countries and territories. Examples of common dishes that started spreading to Russia during this time include golubtsy, a dish that overtook much of Europe in addition to Russia, and Central Asian plov.

Several dishes from this time period were largely forgotten during the Soviet period. Some examples include:

- Poached fish razvarnaya (рыба разварная), fish poached in a essentially a court-bouillon of either brine or wine, or with vinegar, along with spices and aromatics. Historically a very common way to prepare fish in Russia, and traces back to earlier dishes of fish cooked in brine.
- Stuffed vegetables like turnips, carrots, and pumpkins, not dissimilar to varieties of dolma
- Selyanka/solyanka (селянка), not to be confused with the more common solyanka soup, this dish is more similar to Polish bigos and consists of sauerkraut/cabbage fried or braised with meat/fish, seasonings, sometimes vinegar, and often with pickled mushrooms, cucumbers, capers, etc.
- Crayfish butter (раковое масло), made by infusing melted butter with crayfish shells and used consistently in pre-revolutionary cuisine to add flavor to dishes
- Nardek (нардек), a fruit syrup made from reducing watermelon pulp and historically common in the cuisines of Southern Russia (Volgograd Oblast, Saratov oblast) and the Don Cossacks; syrups from other fruits and vegetables were also made historically
- Salnik (сальник), a dish consisting of liver (often lamb) or other offal, onions, and often buckwheat as a filling wrapped with lamb omentum; resembles dishes such as sheftalia or crépinettes
- Stuffed fish (рыба чинёная или фаршированная), where fish are cooked with a filling of buckwheat or rice, mixed with fried roe and onions, sometimes vyaziga

In the last era (Petersburg cuisine), European cuisines like French, German, Dutch, and Italian were incorporated into Russian high cuisine and native dishes continued to evolve. The French popularized potatoes and tomatoes in dishes. Due to the long-lasting cold weather in Russia, many dishes were made to be preserved, so they would not have to take extra trips in the freezing snowy days.

During this era, recipe books were printed more frequently and dishes became more refined. Some notable authors contributing to Pre-Revolutionary cuisine include Ignaty Radetsky (Игнатий Радецкий), Pelageya Alexandrova-Ignatyeva (Пелагея Павловна Александрова-Игнатьева), and perhaps one of the better known authors of the time, Elena Molokhovets and her work A Gift to Young Housewives. Many more recognizable dishes of Russian cuisine begin to appear, such as rassolnik, solyanka, beef stroganoff, guryev porridge, rasstegai, and olivier salad. However, these dishes could differ considerably from their modern form. While rassolnik, for example, was also made with meat/offal and occasionally barley like today, a variety with fish was also well-known at the time, often called Novotroitsky rassolnik (Новотроицкий рассольник). Olivier salad was far more elaborate and could include fried grouse, fresh cucumbers, crawfish, olives, veal tongue, pressed caviar, fresh lettuce, lobster, pickles, and capers. Additionally, a pre-revolutionary sauce called Soya Kabul (Соя кабуль), typically made from soybeans, cayenne, and vinegar, was often incorporated into the dressing.

In the early 20th century, the Revolution saw a rapid decline of elite cuisine, driven both by the new egalitarian state ideology and by disappearance of the old Imperial elites who used to be its consumers. The distinct Soviet cuisine was born, emphasizing fusion of the Union's national cuisines, scientific approach to a diet, and industrial approach to food preparation and serving. It is also during the late Soviet period that recognizable staples of Soviet cuisine emerge on the Russian table, including mayonnaise-based salads like herring under a fur coat and Mimosa salad, as well as the incorporation of processed meats into dishes like okroshka and solyanka. The products used in Russian cuisine also changed considerably; whereas fish had been the main protein for centuries due to the Orthodox Christian fasts, meat dishes became increasingly more common throughout the year. Additionally, many offal products and lamb, once common in pre-revolutionary Russian cuisine, became more obscure.

The fall of the Soviet Union saw the end of state monopoly on food service, and a corresponding diversification of cuisine. As average prosperity grew starting with the second decade after the collapse, so did the demand for fresh culinary experiences, prompting a renaissance of Imperial-era elite cuisine, as well as a wide search for novelty, local specialties, and creative reinterpretations, leading to the birth of what has been dubbed the New Russian cuisine.

== Ethnic and regional variations and influences ==
The national Russian cuisine has evolved in a multicultural and multiethnic state, with strong mutual influence from the cuisines of other ethnic groups that live within the nation's borders or had been a part of the Russian state historically.

Despite such deep mutual influence, many national cuisines within the borders of the Russian Federation maintain their uniqueness, such as Bashkir cuisine, Tatar cuisine, Sakha cuisine, or Yamal cuisine.

The Russian cuisine itself is also geographically diverse, its variations dependent on raw materials and cooking methods available locally. In the north of Russia, it incorporates local berries such as cloudberry or crowberry, fish such as cod, game meat such as elk, or even edible moss known as yagel. Conversely, in Siberia it includes the local fish varieties, particularly those of the coregonus genus such as arctic cisco or muksun, and borrows the local cooking methods, to result in raw fish eaten frozen or combined with spices. Further east, local specialties are added such as eagle fern, kolomikta fruit, scallops and Kamchatka crabs.

== Soups ==
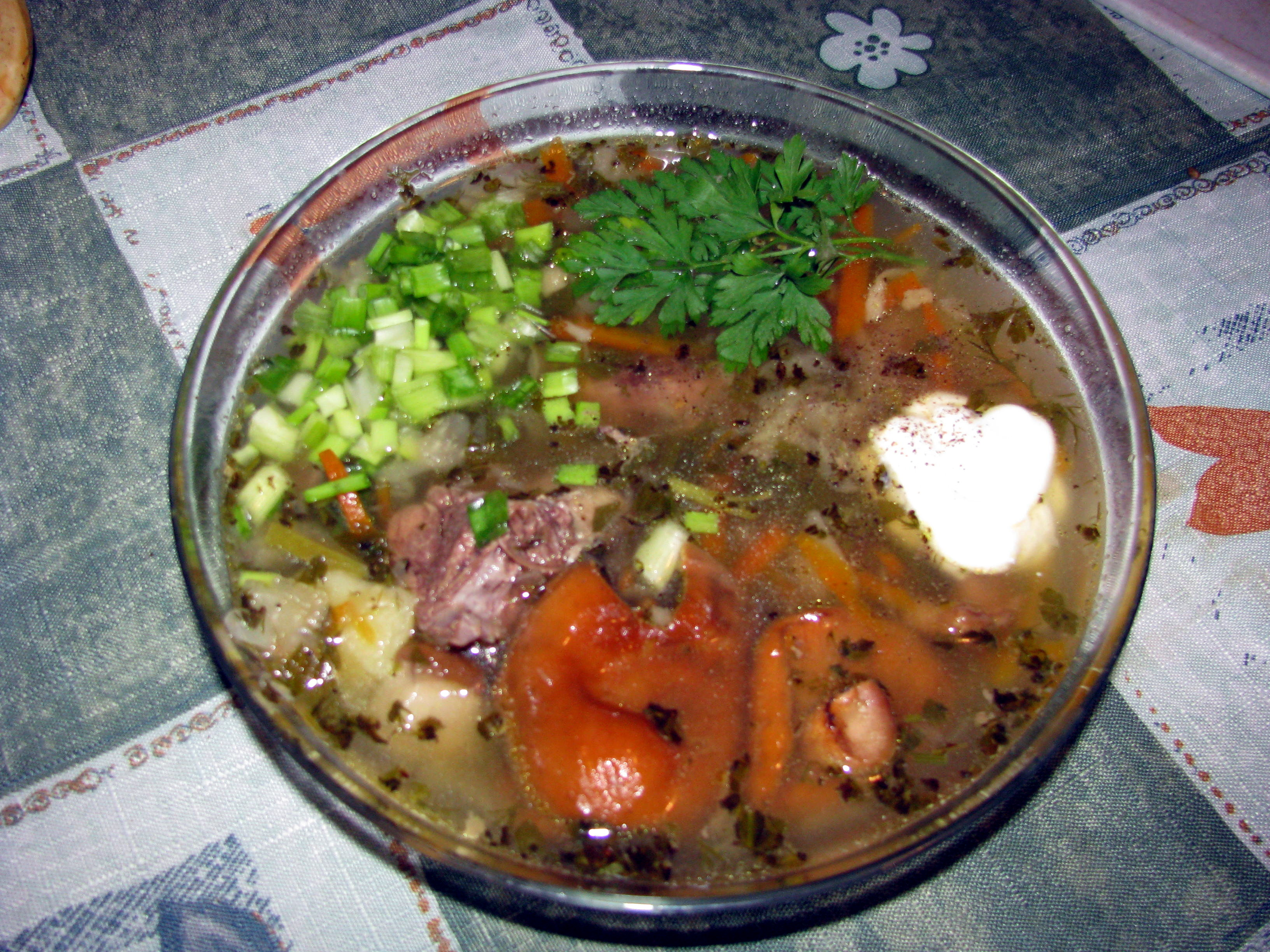
Shchi

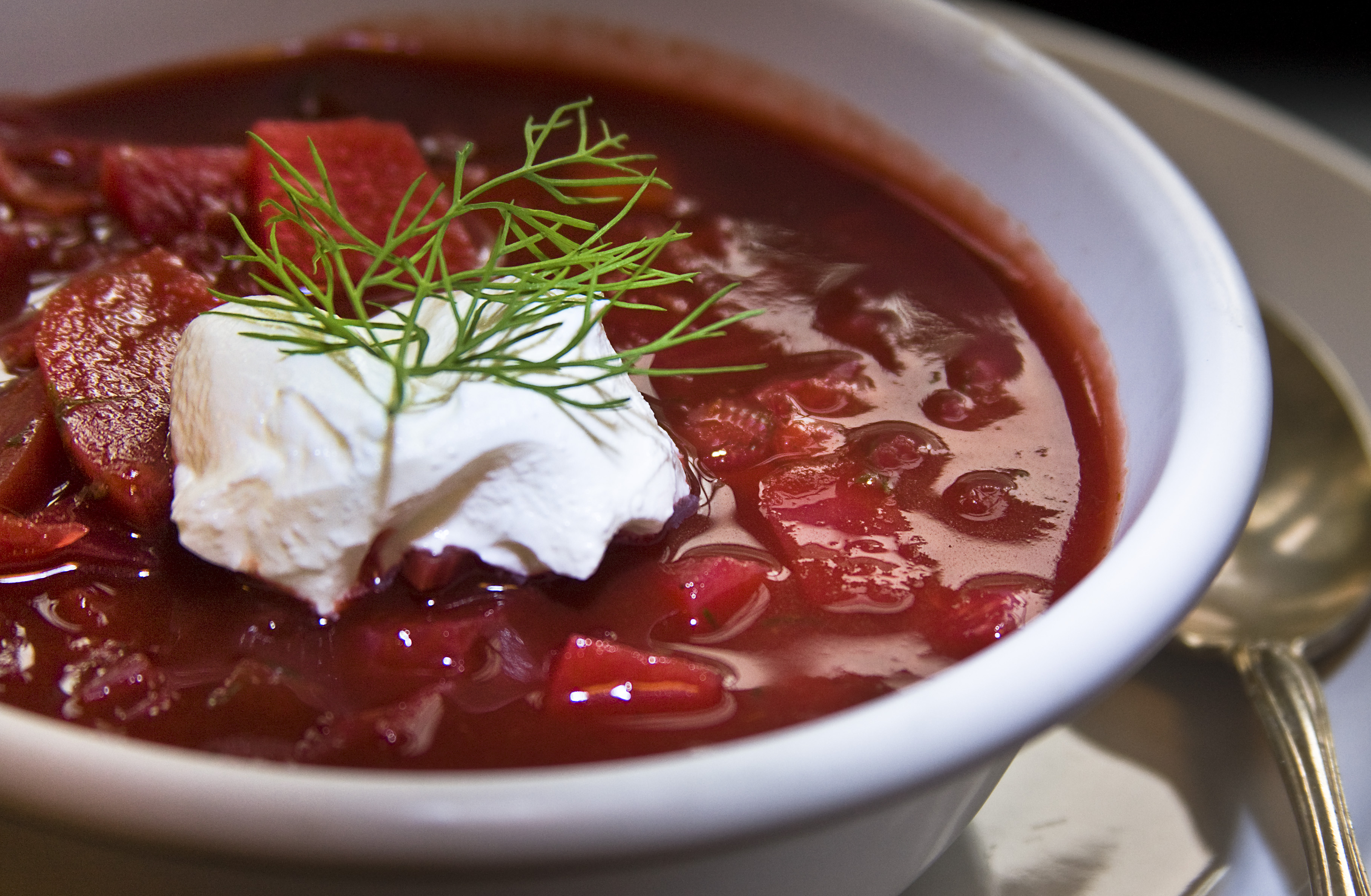
Borscht served

Soups have always played an important role in Russian cuisine. The traditional staple of soups such as shchi (щи), borscht (борщ), ukha (уха́), rassolnik (рассо́льник), solyanka (соля́нка), botvinya (ботви́нья), okroshka (окро́шка), and tyurya (тю́ря) was enlarged in the 18th to 20th centuries by both European and Central Asian staples like clear soups, puréed soups, stews, and many others.

Russian soups can be divided into at least seven large groups:

- Chilled soups based on kvass, such as tyurya, okroshka, and botvinya.
- Light soups and stews based on water and vegetables, such as svekolnik.
- Noodle soups with meat, mushrooms, or milk.
- Soups based on cabbage, most prominently shchi.
- Thick soups based on meat broth, with a salty-sour base like rassolnik and solyanka.
- Fish soups such as ukha.
- Grain- and vegetable-based soups.

=== Cold soups ===
Okroshka is a cold soup based on kvass or (less frequently) various kinds of sour milk; kefir is often preferred nowadays. Okroshka is also a salad. The main ingredients are two types of vegetables that can be mixed with cold boiled meat or fish in a 1:1 proportion. Thus vegetable, meat, poultry, and fish varieties of okroshka are made.

There are typically two types of vegetables in okroshka. The first must have a neutral taste, such as boiled potatoes, turnips, rutabagas, carrots, or fresh cucumbers. The second must be spicy and aromatic, like radishes or green onion as well as other herbs—greens of dill, parsley, chervil, celery, or tarragon. Different meat and poultry can be used in the same soup. The most common ingredient is beef alone or with poultry. A mild bologna-like sausage is sometimes used. If it is made with fish, the best choice would be tench, European perch, pike-perch, cod, or other neutral-tasting fish. In the coastal areas smoked and/or salted salmon is preferred instead, often in combination with other meats.

The kvass most commonly used in cooking is white okroshka kvass, which is much more sour than drinking kvass. Spices used include mustard, black pepper and pickled cucumber (specifically, the liquid from the pickles), solely or in combination. For the final touch, boiled eggs and smetana (similar to crème fraîche) are added. Often, the mustard, chopped hard-boiled yolks, pepper and pickle brine are combined into a spicy sauce that is added to the soup to taste.

For sour milk-based okroshka, well-shaken natural sour milk (often with the addition of seed oil) is used with the addition of pure water and ground garlic. Sometimes manufactured kefir is used instead of natural sour milk for time-saving reasons, though some say it detracts from the original taste of okroshka.

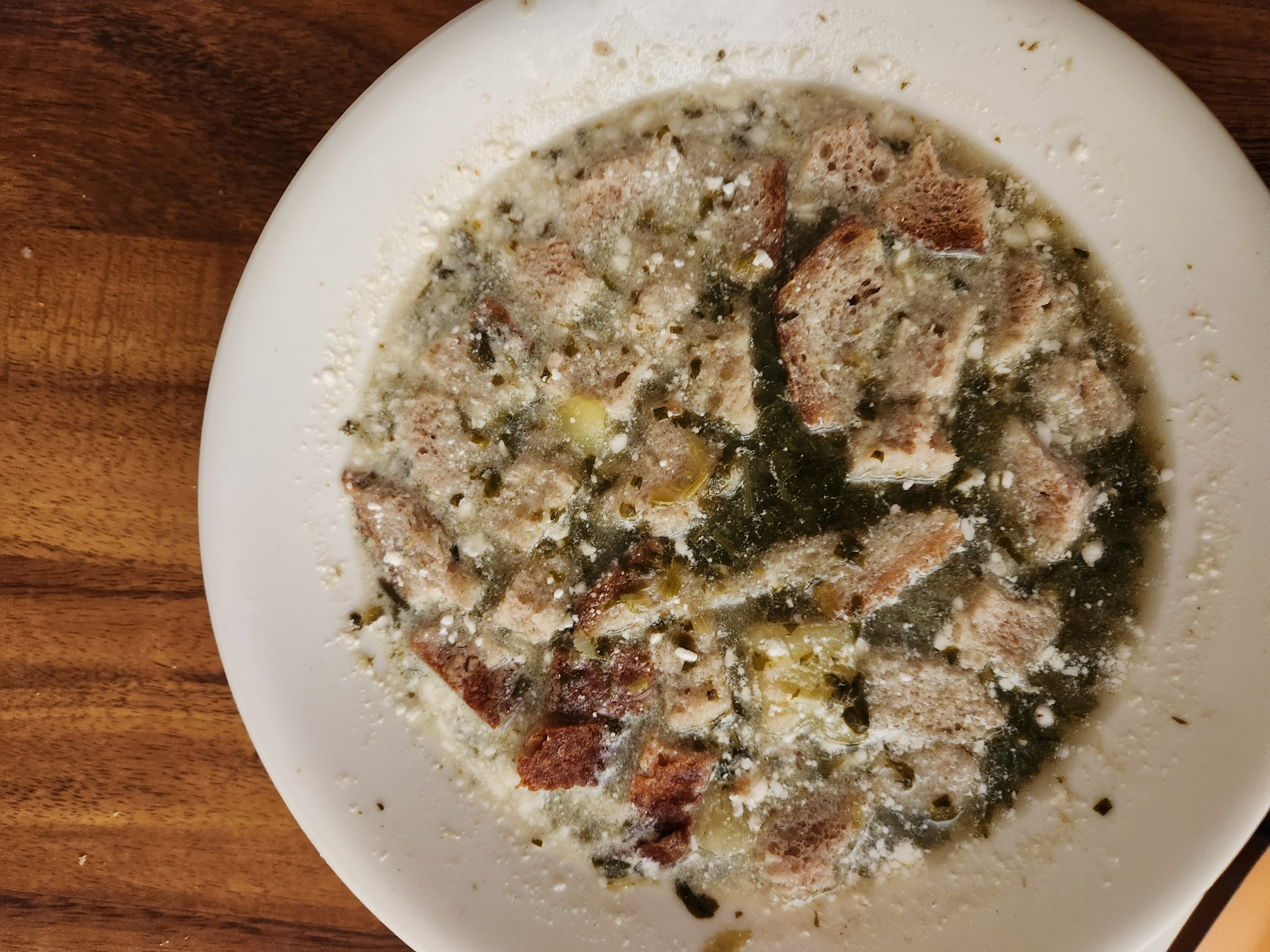
Tyurya

Tyurya is very similar to okroshka, the main difference being that instead of vegetables, bread, sometimes with addition of onion and vegetable oil, is soaked in kvass, similar to Silesian wodzionka or Portuguese açorda. It was commonly consumed during rough times (such as the Russian Revolution, World War I, and World War II) and by poor peasants. Also, due to its simplicity, it was very common as a meal during religious fasting.

Botvinya is another type of cold soup. The name of the soup comes from the Russian word botva, which means "leafy tops of root vegetables", and, true to its name, it is made with the leafy tops of young beets, as well as sorrel, scallions, dill, cucumbers, and two types of kvass. Mustard, garlic, and horseradish are then added for flavor. The vegetables are blanched, then rubbed through a sieve, and kvass is poured over them.

Svyokolnik (also known as kholodnik) is a cold borscht. It consists of beet sour or beet juice blended with sour cream, buttermilk, soured milk, kefir or yogurt. The mixture has a distinctive orange or pink color. It is served chilled, typically over finely chopped beetroot, cucumbers, radishes and spring onion, together with halved hard-boiled eggs and sprinkled with fresh dill. Chopped veal, ham, or crawfish tails may be added as well.

=== Hot soups ===
Shchi (cabbage soup) had been the predominant first course in Russian cuisine for over a thousand years. Shchi knew no social class boundaries, and even if the rich had richer ingredients and the poor made it solely of cabbage and onions, all these "poor" and "rich" variations were cooked in the same tradition. The unique taste of this cabbage soup was from the fact that after cooking it was left to draw (stew) in a Russian stove. The "spirit of shchi" was inseparable from a Russian izba (log hut). Many Russian proverbs are connected to this soup, such as Shchi da kasha — pishcha nasha (Russian: Щи да каша — пища наша, "Shchi and porridge are our staples"). It can be eaten regularly, and at any time of the year.

The richer variant of shchi includes several ingredients, but the first and last components are necessary:

1. Cabbage.
2. Meat (very rarely fish or mushrooms).
3. Carrots, basil or parsley roots.
4. Spicy herbs (onions, celery, dill, garlic, pepper, bay leaf).
5. Sour components (smetana, apples, sauerkraut, pickle water).

When this soup is served, smetana is added. It is eaten with rye bread. Older tradition called for thickening shchi with a sort of roux, made by scalding a portion of the flour with a boiling broth, without frying it first, to increase the soup's caloric content, especially if the meat was not used; but about late XVIII century, and especially in the higher-class cooking, this was abandoned for the sake of the finer taste. During much of the year when the Orthodox Christian Church prescribes abstinence from meat and dairy, a vegan version of shchi is made. "Kislye" (sour) schi are made from pickled cabbage (sauerkraut), "serye" (grey) schi from the green outer leaves of the cabbage head. "Zelyonye" (green) schi are made from sorrel leaves, not cabbage, and used to be a popular summer soup.

Borscht is made of broth, beets, and tomatoes with various vegetables, including onions, cabbage, tomato, carrots, and celery. Borscht usually includes meat, particularly beef in Russia, and pork in Ukraine. Borscht is generally served very hot, with sour cream, chopped chives or parsley, and crushed garlic. Borscht is traditionally served with black bread. Borscht is associated as national cuisine in various different Eastern European countries such as Ukraine, Poland, Belarus, and Lithuania.

Ukha is a warm watery fish dish; however, calling it a fish soup would not be absolutely correct. "Ukha" as a name for fish broth was established only in the late 17th to early 18th centuries. In earlier times this name was first given to thick meat broths, and then later chicken. Beginning from the 15th century, fish was more and more often used to prepare ukha, thus creating a dish that had a distinctive taste among soups.

A minimum of vegetables is added in preparation, and in classical cooking, ukha was simply a rich fish broth served to accompany fish pies (rasstegai, kuliebiaka, etc.). These days it is more often a fish soup, cooked with potatoes, and other vegetables. A wide variety of freshwater fish is traditionally used.

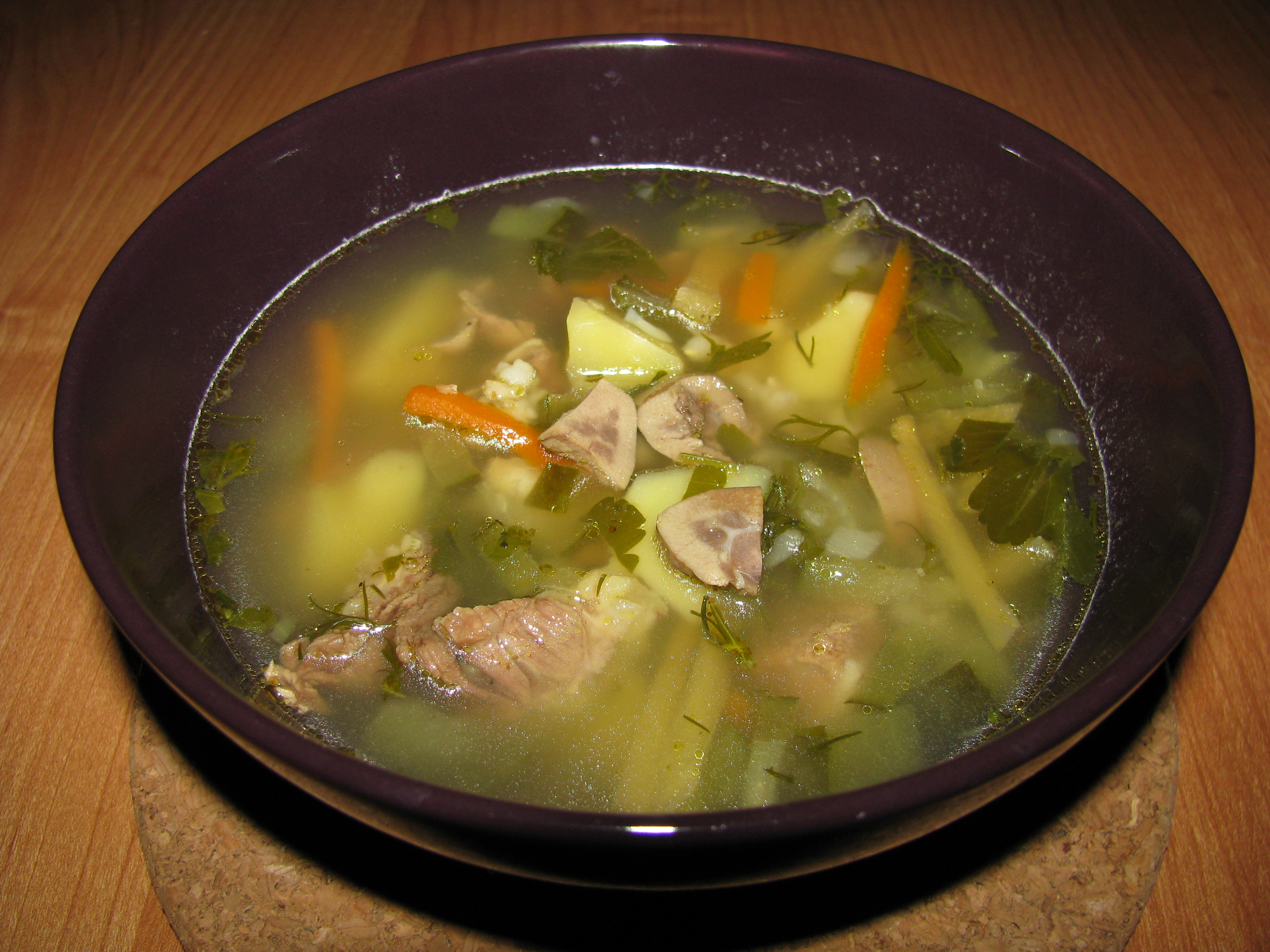
Rassolnik

Rassolnik is a hot soup in a salty-sour cucumber base. This dish formed in Russian cuisine quite late—only in the 19th century. About this time the name rassolnik was attached to it, originating from the Russian word rassol which means "brine" (pickle water). Pickle water was known to be used as a base for soups from the 15th century at the latest. Its concentration and ratio with other liquids and soup components gave birth to different soups: solyanka, shchi, and of course rassolnik. The latest is moderately sour-salty soups on pickled cucumber base. Some are vegetarian, but more often with products like veal or beef kidneys or all poultry giblets (stomach, liver, heart, neck, feet). For best taste, there has to be a balance between the sour part and neutral absorbers (cereals, potatoes, root vegetables). Typical rassolnik is based on kidneys, brine (and pickles), vegetables and barley.

Kal'ya was a very common dish first served in the 16th–17th centuries. Subsequently, it almost completely disappeared from Russian cuisine. Often it was incorrectly called "fish rassolnik". The cooking technique is mostly the same as of ukha, but to the broth were added pickled cucumbers, pickle water, lemons and lemon juice, either separately or all together. The main characteristic of kal'ya is that only fat, rich fish was used; sometimes caviar was added along with the fish. More spices are added, and the soup turns out more piquant and thicker than ukha. Formerly kal'ya was considered a festivity dish.

Solyanka is a thick, piquant soup that combines components from shchi (cabbage, smetana) and rassolnik (pickle water and cucumbers), spices such as olives, capers, tomatoes, lemons, lemon juice, kvass, salted and pickled mushrooms make up a considerably strong sour-salty base of the soup. Solyanka is much thicker than other soups, about 1/3 less liquid ratio. Three types are distinguished: meat, fish, and simple solyanka. The first two are cooked on strong meat or fish broths, and the last on mushroom or vegetable broth. All the broths are mixed with cucumber pickle water.

Lapsha (noodle soup) was adopted by Russians from Tatars, and after some transformation became widespread in Russia. It comes in three variations: chicken, mushroom, and milk. Cooking all three is simple, including preparation of noodles, cooking of corresponding broth, and boiling of noodles in broth. Noodles are based on the same wheat flour or buckwheat/wheat flour mix. Mixed flour noodles go better with mushroom or milk broth.

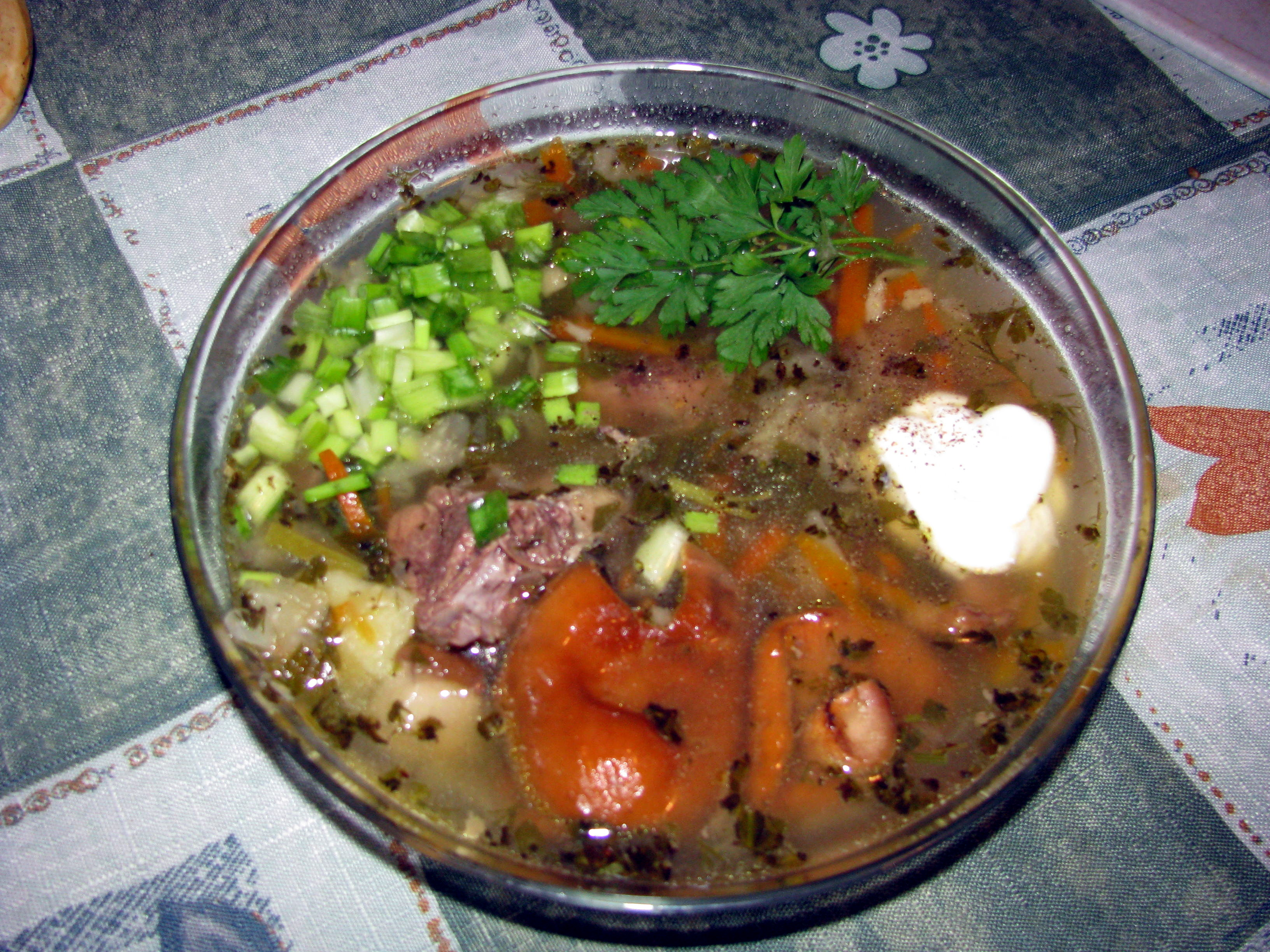
Shchi

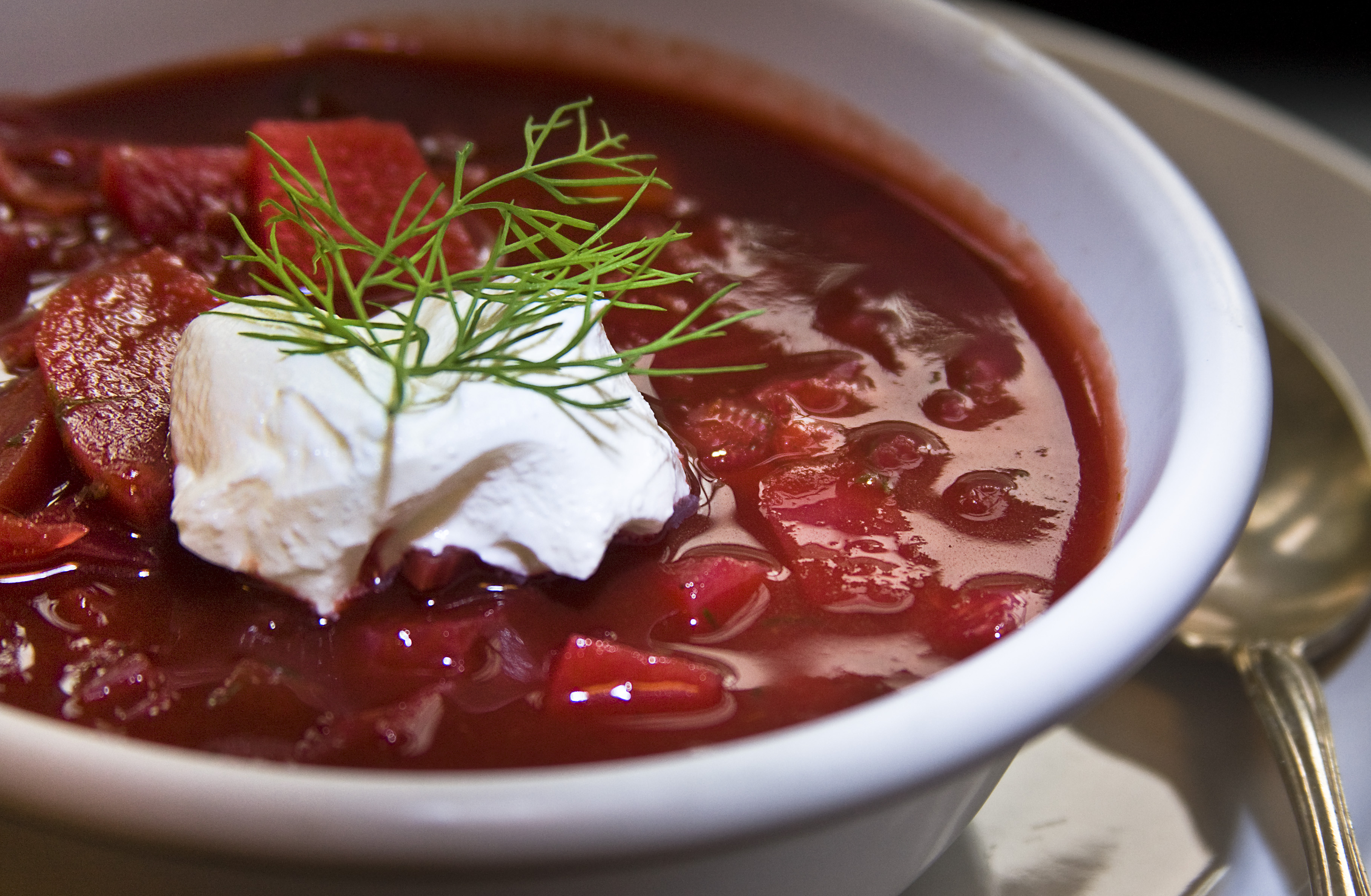
Borscht

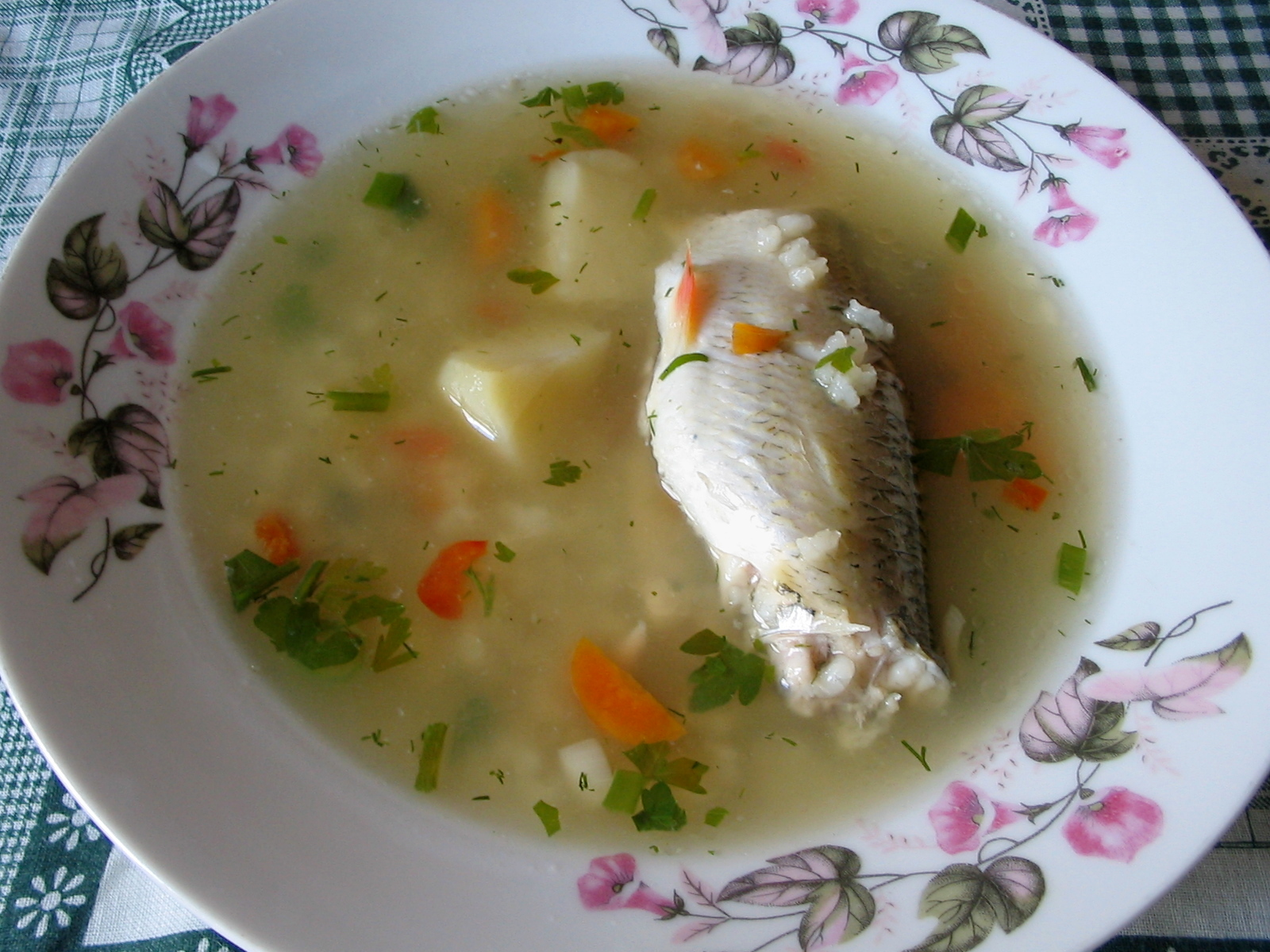
Ukha

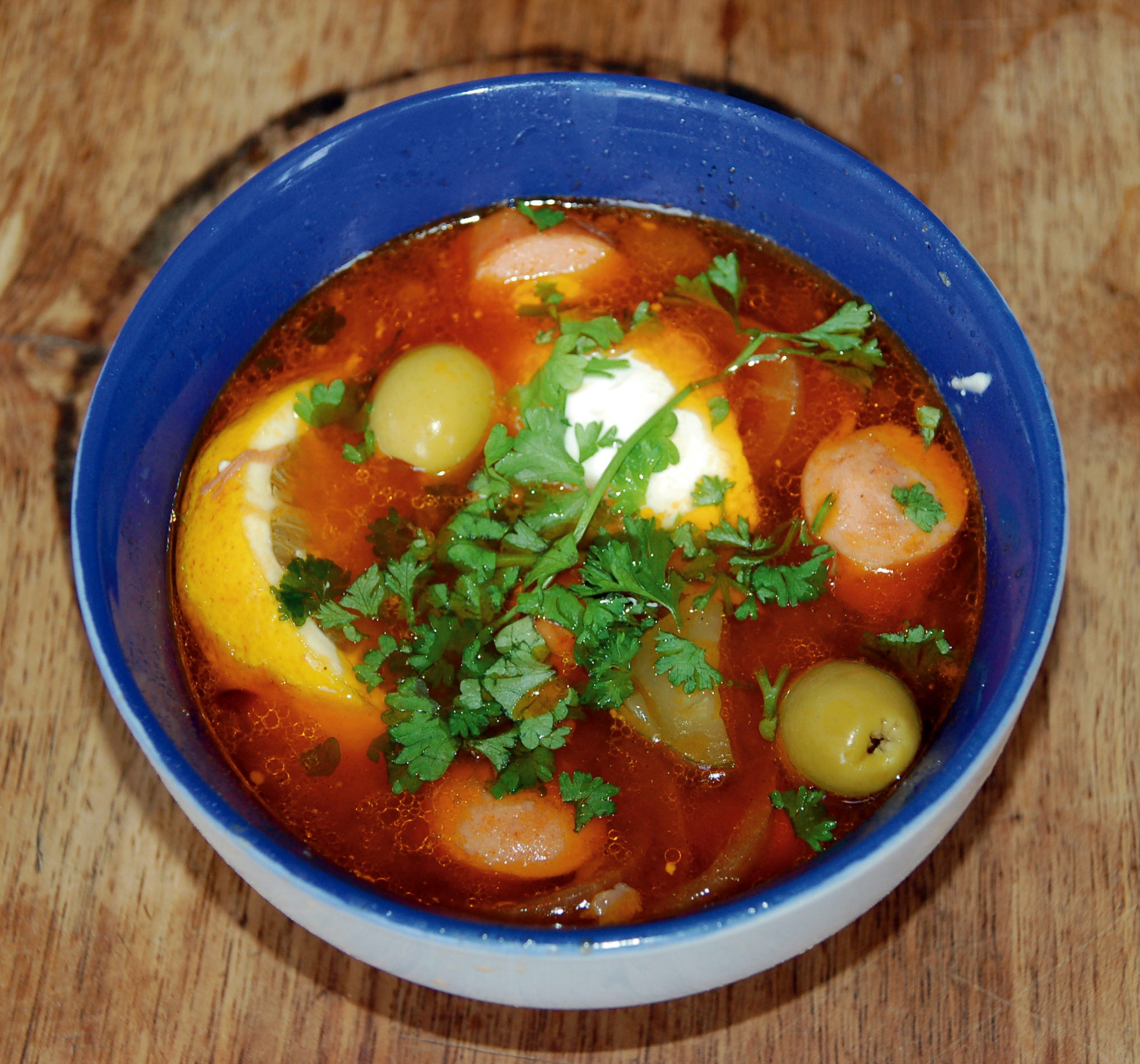
Solyanka

== Salads ==
Olivier salad (also known as Russian salad) is a mayonnaise-based potato salad distinguished by its diced texture and the contrasting flavors of pickles, hard-boiled eggs, boiled carrots, boiled potatoes, meat, and peas. This dish is one of the main features of New Year buffets.

Sel'edka pod shuboy (or shuba, from Russian: шуба, lit. 'fur coat'), also known as "dressed herring", is chopped salted herring under a "coat" of shredded cooked beet, sometimes with a layer of egg or other vegetables.

Vinegret (from French vinaigrette) is a salad made of boiled beets, potatoes, carrots, pickles, onions, sauerkraut, and sometimes peas or white beans. It is dressed with sunflower or olive oil.

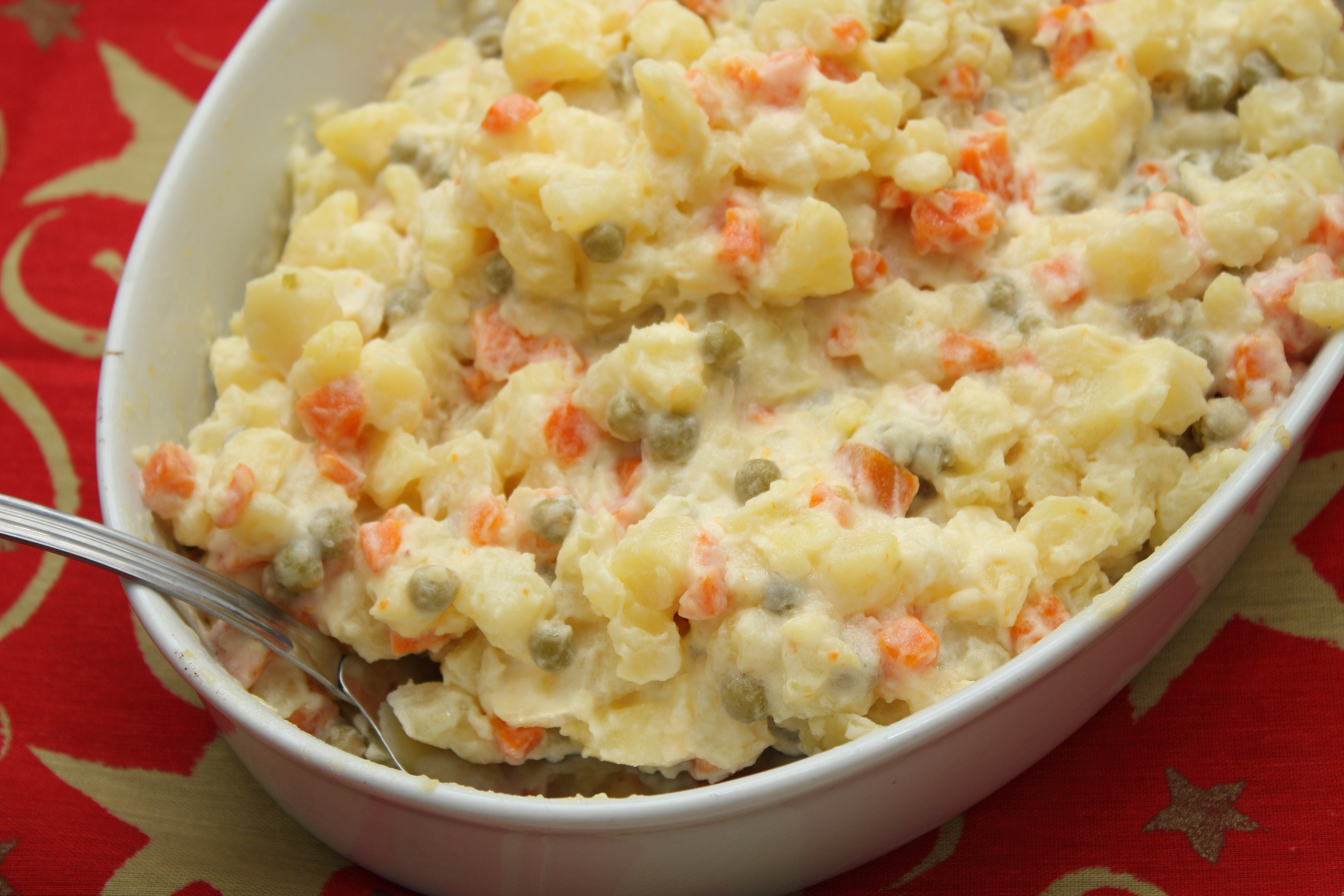
Olivier salad

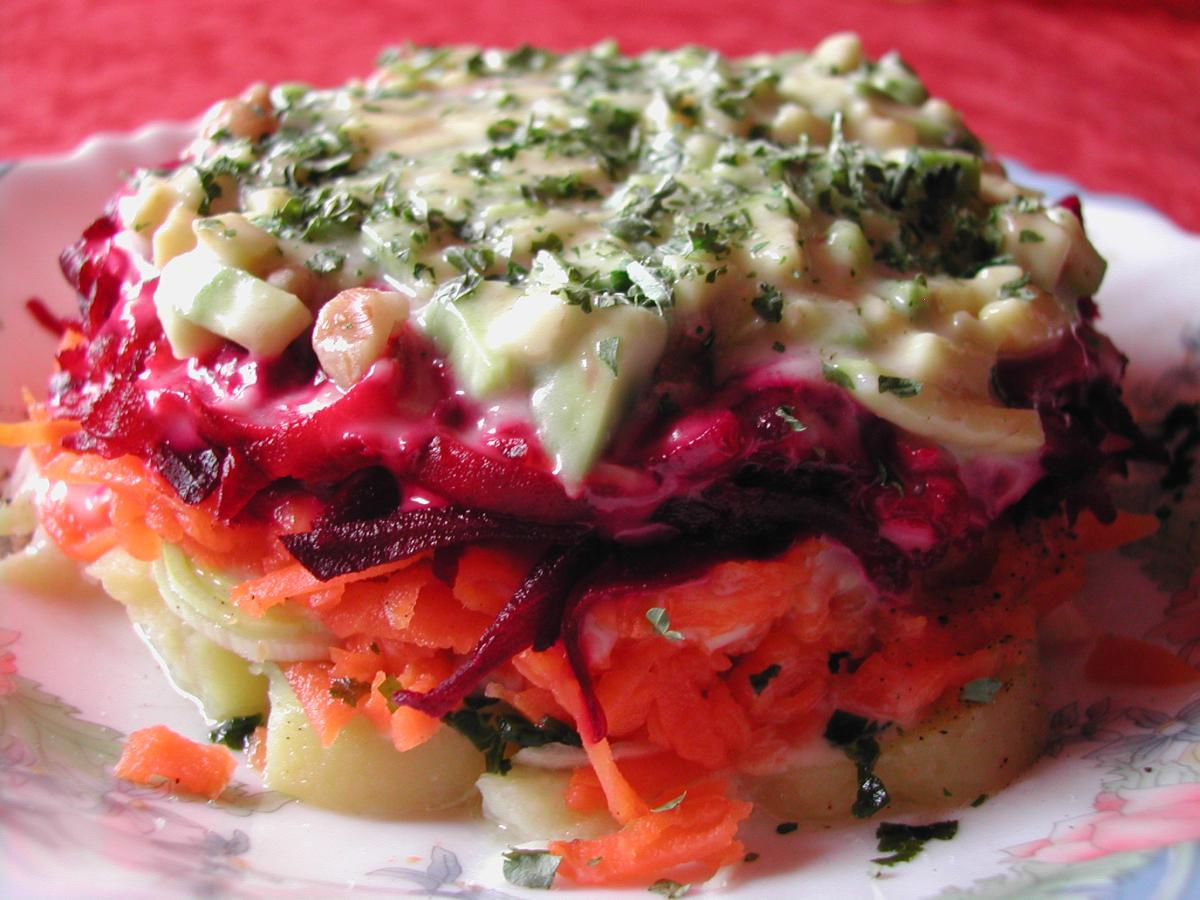
Dressed herring

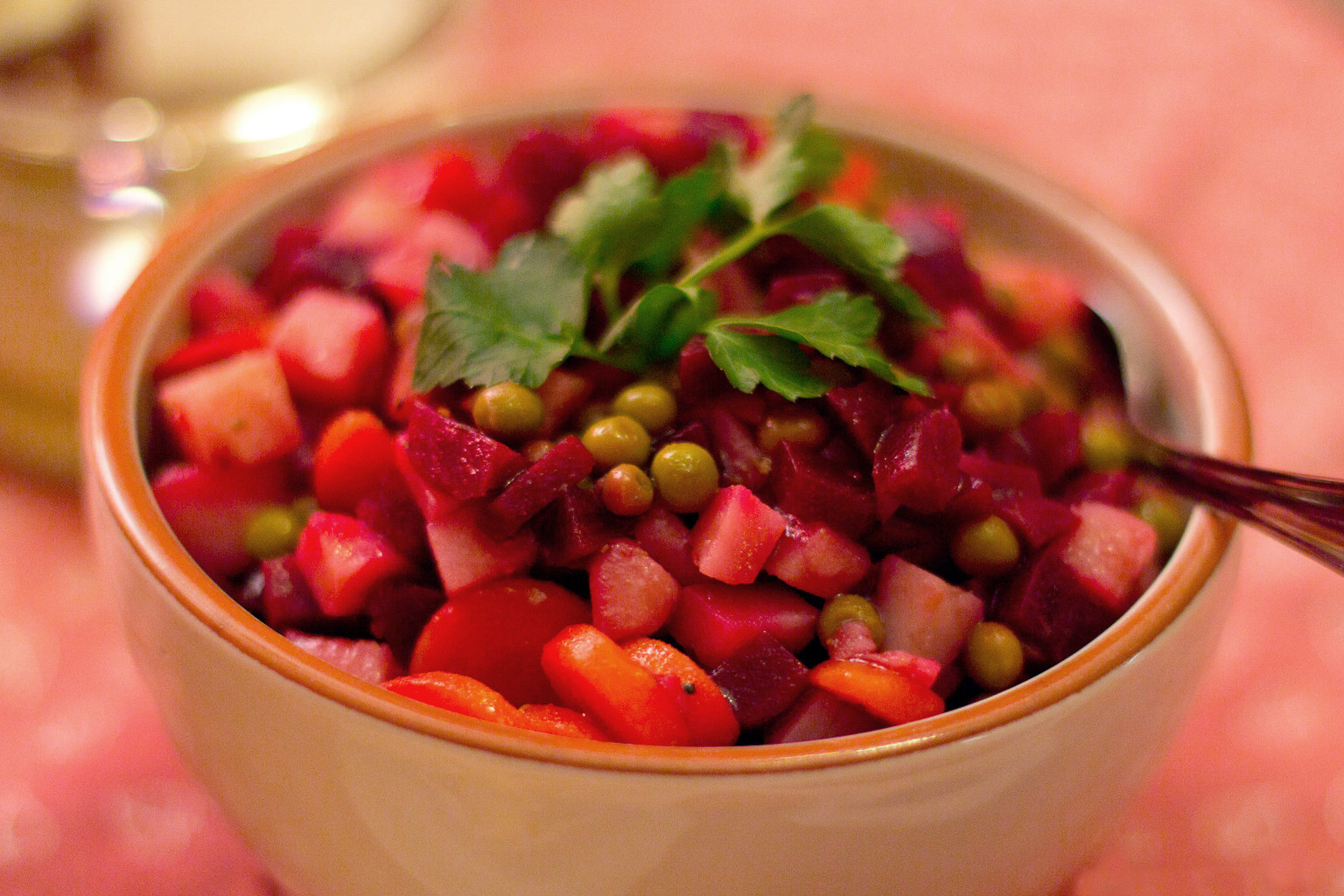
Vinegret

== Porridge ==
Porridge is one of the most important dishes in traditional Russian cuisine. The variety of cereals is based on the local variety of crops. In Russian, the word kasha refers to any kind of porridge.

The most popular cereals are buckwheat, millet, semolina, oats, barley, and rice. Traditionally, such cereal porridge is cooked in milk, especially if it is to be served for breakfast. Butter, salt, sugar, jams, fresh fruit and berries may be added.

Plain cooked porridges, especially buckwheat and rice, may be served as a side dish with other meals.

Canned meat, tushonka, is made with buckwheat/rice kasha traditions in mind, unlike the bully beef type of canned meat. While average-priced tushyonka contains a large portion of lard and jelly, this very non-meaty addition to meat can be used as a sauce for enriching rice or buckwheat kasha's taste.

== Main dishes ==
=== Meat ===
In traditional Russian cuisine three basic variations of meat dishes can be highlighted:

- a large boiled piece of meat cooked in a soup or porridge, and then used as the second course or served cold (particularly in jellied stock such as kholodets, below)
- offal dishes (liver, tripe, etc.), baked in pots together with cereals;
- whole fowl dishes or parts of fowl (legs or breasts), or a large piece of meat (rump) baked on a baking tray in an oven, so-called "zharkoye" (from the word "zhar"(жар) meaning "heat")

Affluent households also mention sausage-making, spit-roasted meats, stews and many other meat dishes.

As a garnish to meat dishes in the past the most common were porridges and cereals, in which the meat was boiled, later on boiled or rather steamed and baked root vegetables (turnips, carrots) as well as mushrooms; additionally the meat, without taking account its type, was garnished with pickled products—pickled cabbage, or sour and "soaked" (marinated) apples (mochoniye yabloki) or cranberries. Pan juices, alone or mixed with sour cream or melted butter, were used as gravy to pour on garnishing vegetables and porridges. Meat sauces, i.e. gravies based on flour, butter, eggs and milk, are not common for traditional Russian cuisine.

Pelmeni are a traditional Eastern European (mainly Russian) dish usually made with minced meat filling, wrapped in thin dough (made out of flour and eggs, sometimes with milk or water added). For filling, pork, lamb, beef, or any other kind of meat can be used; mixing several kinds is popular. The traditional Ural recipe requires the filling be made with 45% of beef, 35% of lamb, and 20% of pork. Traditionally, various spices, such as pepper, onions, and garlic, are mixed into the filling.

Russians seem to have learned to make pelmeni from Finno-Ugric people. The word means "ear-shaped bread" in Finno-Ugric languages such as Udmurt and Komi; pel' means 'ear' and n'an means 'bread'. In Siberia they were made in large quantities and stored safely frozen outside for several winter months. In mainland Russia, the term "Siberian pel'meni" refers to pel'meni made with a mix of meats (whether the 45/35/20 mix mentioned above or another ratio), rather than a single meat. By the late 19th century, they became a staple throughout urban European Russia. They are prepared immediately before eating by boiling in water until they float, and then 2–5 minutes more. The resulting dish is served with butter or sour cream (mustard, horseradish, and vinegar are popular as well). Some recipes suggest frying pelmeni after boiling until they turn golden brown.

Pelmeni belong to the family of dumplings. They are akin to vareniki, a Ukrainian variety of dumplings with a filling made of, most commonly, mashed potatoes, farmer's cheese, or cherries. They are not dissimilar to Chinese potstickers, Tibetan mo-mo and Italian ravioli, as well as the manti of the Kazakh and Kyrgyz cultures. The main difference between pelmeni and other kinds of dumplings is in their shape and size; the typical pelmen' is roughly spherical and is about 2 to 3 cm in diameter, whereas most other types of dumplings are usually elongated and much larger.

The process of making pelmeni is somewhat labor-intensive, but a pelmennitsa greatly speeds up the task. This device typically consists of a round aluminum plate with a matrix of holes surrounded by ridges. A sheet of dough is placed over the matrix, a filling is scooped into each "cell", and the dough sags under the weight of the filling, forming the body of the dumpling. Another sheet of dough is placed on top, and a wooden roller is rolled over the top, pressing the dough layers together, cutting the dumplings apart by the ridges, and forcing the dumplings to fall through the holes. Using a pelmennitsa, the chef can quickly manufacture batches of dumplings at a time.

Various minced meat dishes were adopted from other cuisines and became popular only in the nineteenth and twentieth centuries; for traditional Russian cuisine, they are not typical.

Kotlety (minced cutlets) are pan-fried cutlet-shaped patties, not dissimilar from Salisbury steak and other such dishes. Kotlety are made from pork and beef, or from chicken, sometimes also from fish. In common recipes, ground meat, pork, onions and bread are put in a bowl and mixed thoroughly until it becomes relatively consistent. Once this effect is achieved, patties are formed and then put into a hot frying pan to cook. Pozharsky cutlet is a more elaborated version which was adopted by French haute cuisine.

Beef Stroganoff: Sautéed pieces of beef served in a sauce with smetana (sour cream). From its origins in mid-19th-century Russia, it has become popular around the world, with considerable variation from the original recipe.

Shashlyk is a form of shish kebab (marinated meat grilled on a skewer) popular in former Soviet Union countries, notably in Georgia, Russia, Armenia, Azerbaijan, and Uzbekistan. It often features alternating slices of meat and onions. Even though the word "shashlyk" was apparently borrowed from the Crimean Tatars by the Cossacks as early as the 18th century, kebabs did not reach Moscow until the late 19th century, according to Vladimir Gilyarovsky's "Moscow and Moscovites". From then on, their popularity spread rapidly; by the 1910s they were a staple in St. Petersburg restaurants and by the 1920s they were already a ubiquitous street food all over urban Russia. Shashlik is also used in Russia as a food to be cooked in an outdoor environment, similarly to barbecue in English-speaking countries.

Kholodets (or studen'): Jellied chopped pieces of pork or veal meat with some spices added (pepper, parsley, garlic, bay leaf) and minor amounts of vegetables (carrots, onions). The meat is boiled in large pieces for long periods of time, then chopped, boiled a few times again and finally chilled for 3–4 hours (hence the name) forming a jelly mass, though gelatin is not used because calves' feet, pigs' heads and other such offal is gelatinous enough on its own. It is served with horseradish, mustard, or ground garlic with smetana.

Gulyash is also a very popular dish in Russia. Of course, this is the Hungarian dish Goulash originally, but it was still very popular in the USSR. It had its place in domestic cuisine, and was served in Soviet canteens in plants and factories.

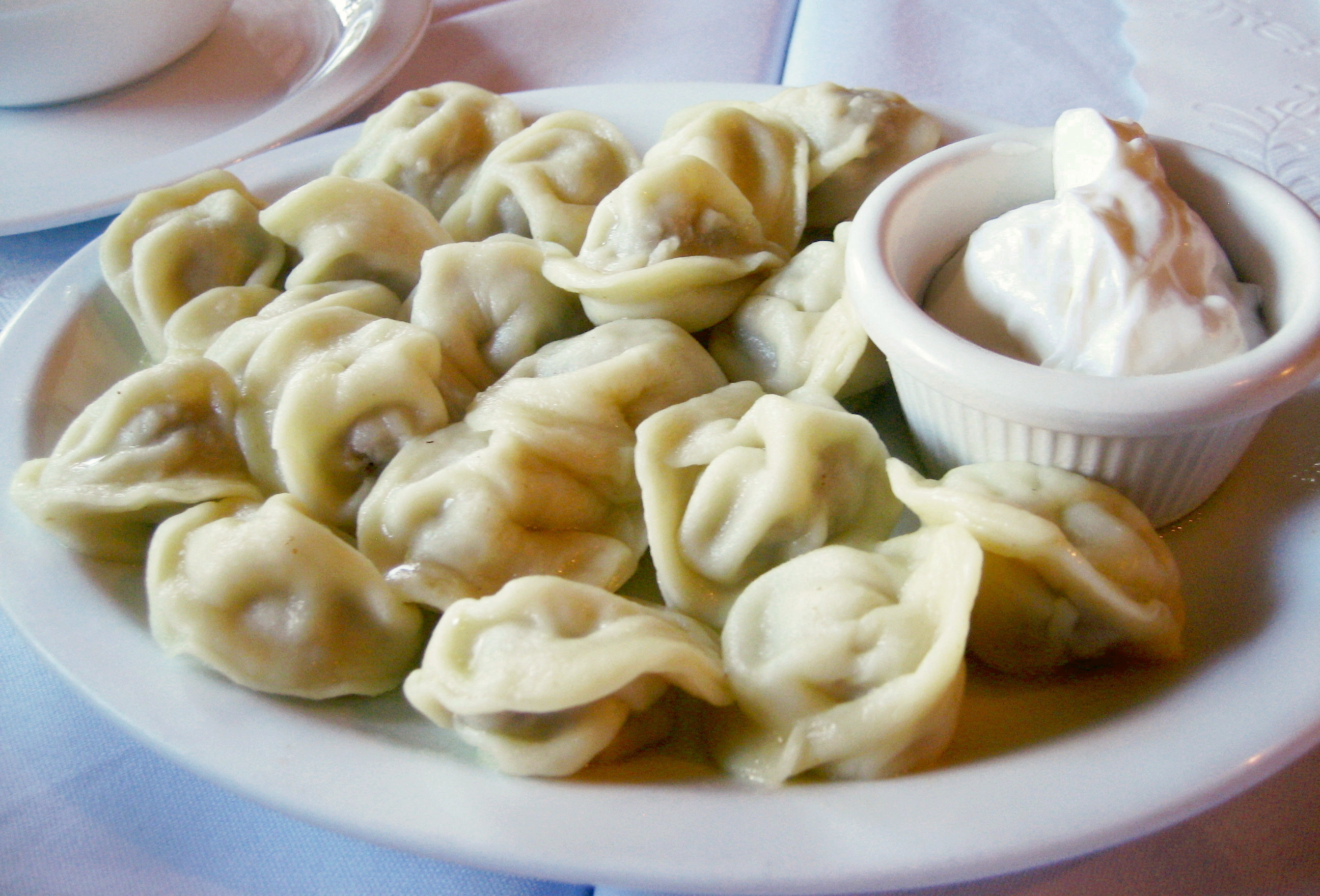
Pelmeni

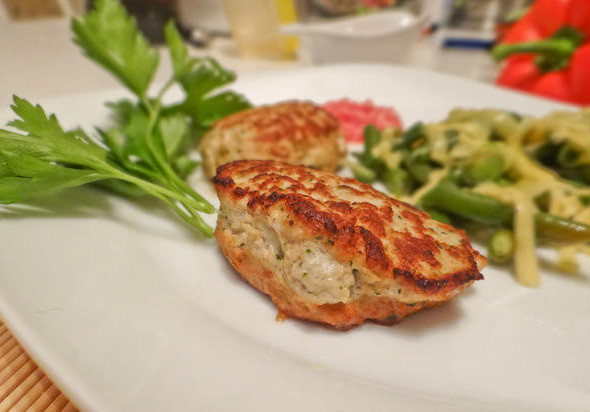
Chicken cutlets

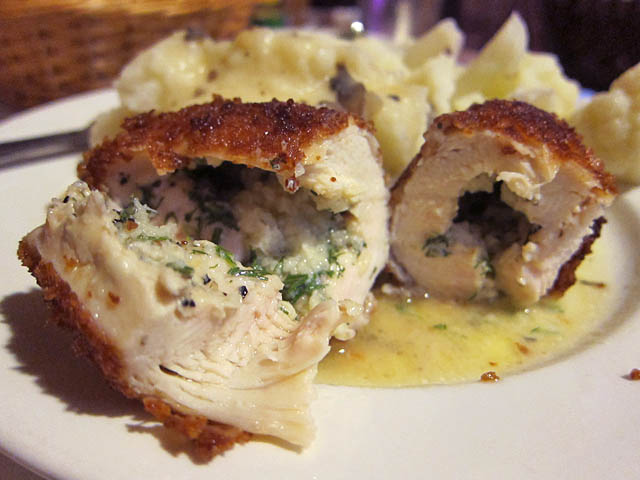
Chicken Kiev

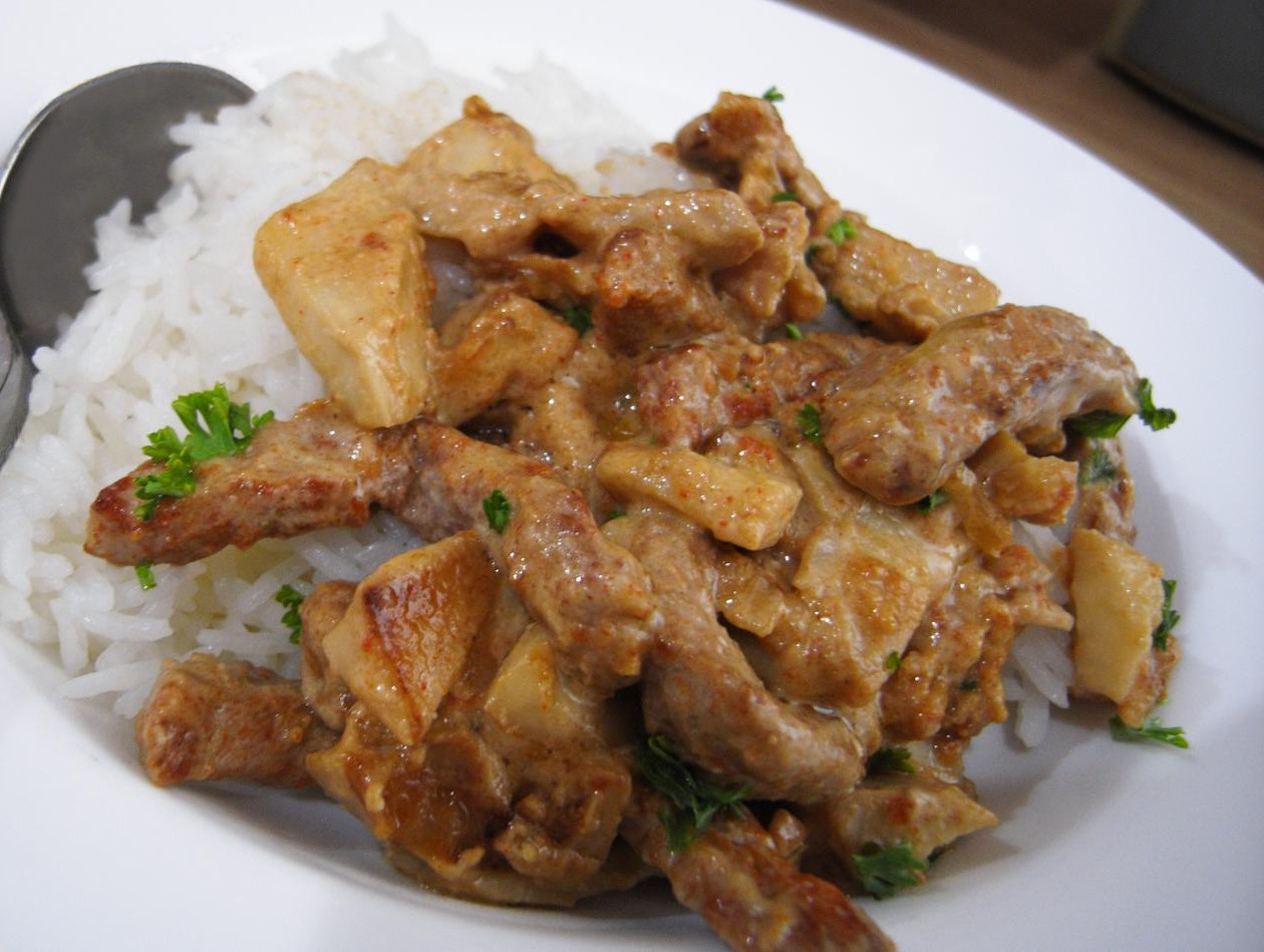
Beef Stroganoff served with rice

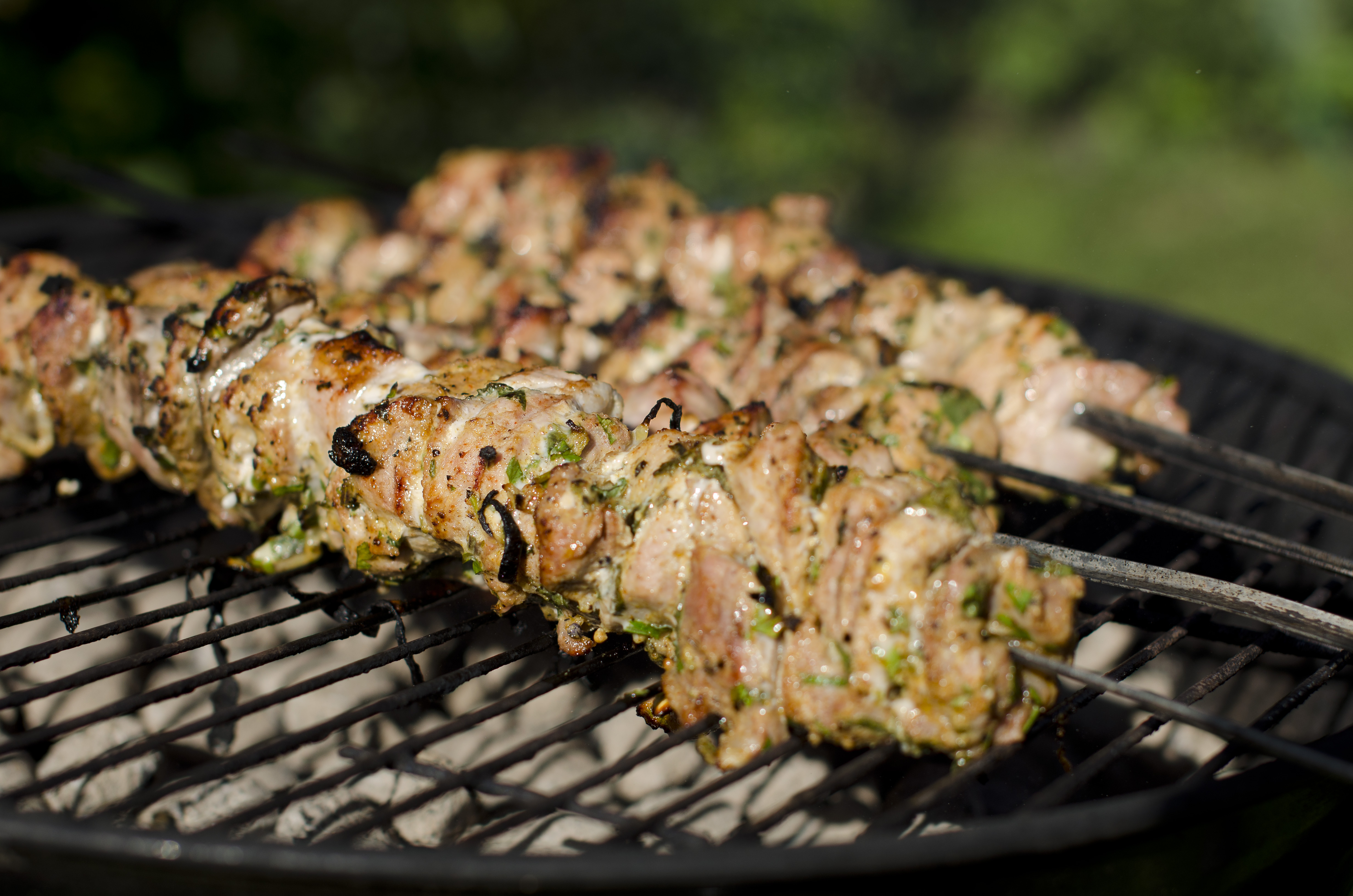
Shashlyk

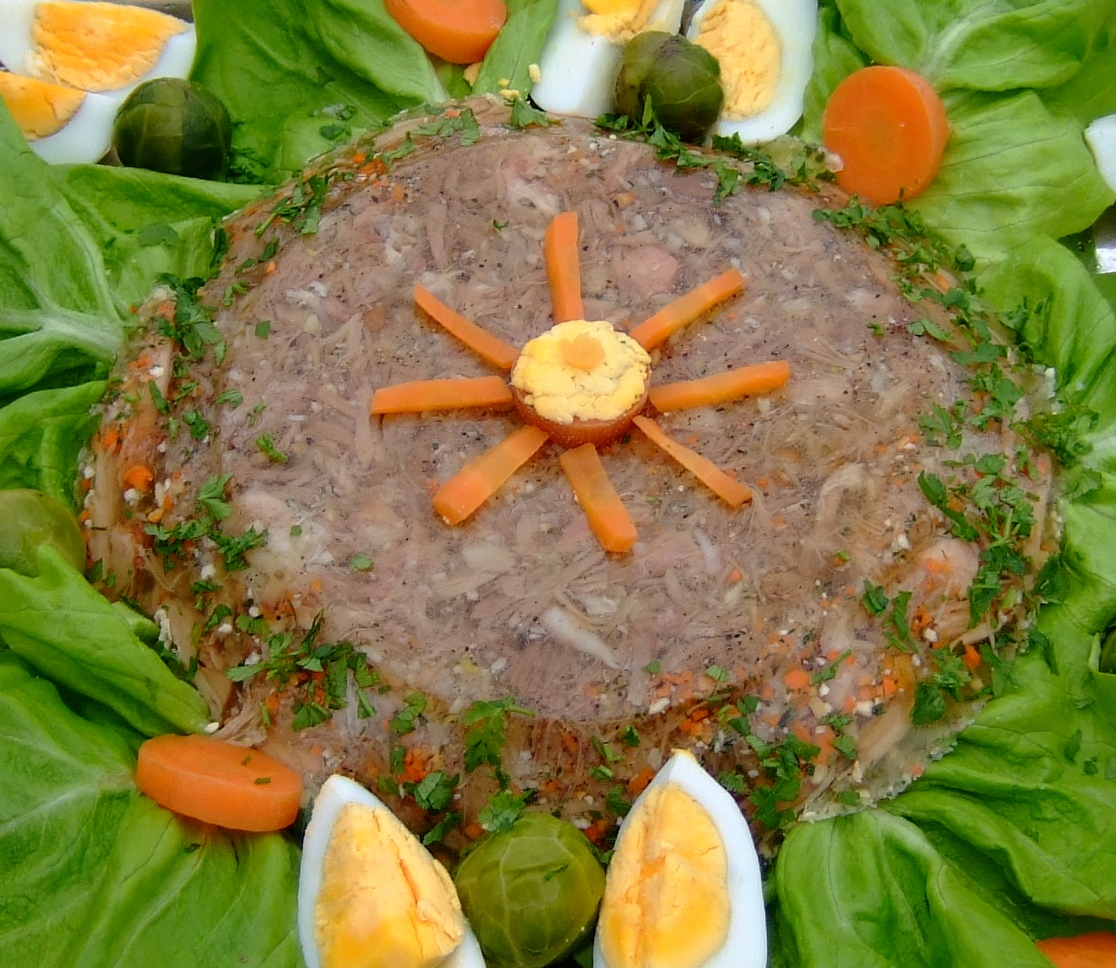
Kholodets

=== Fish ===
Fish was important in pre-revolutionary cuisine, especially on Russian Orthodox fast days when meat was forbidden, similar to the Catholic custom of eating fish instead of meat on Fridays. Strictly freshwater fish such as carp and sudak (Sander lucioperca, Zander) were commonly eaten in inland areas, as well as anadromous sturgeon and in northern areas salmon, pike and trout. A greater variety of fish—including saltwater species—were preserved by salting, pickling or smoking and consumed as "zakuski" (hors d'oeuvres).

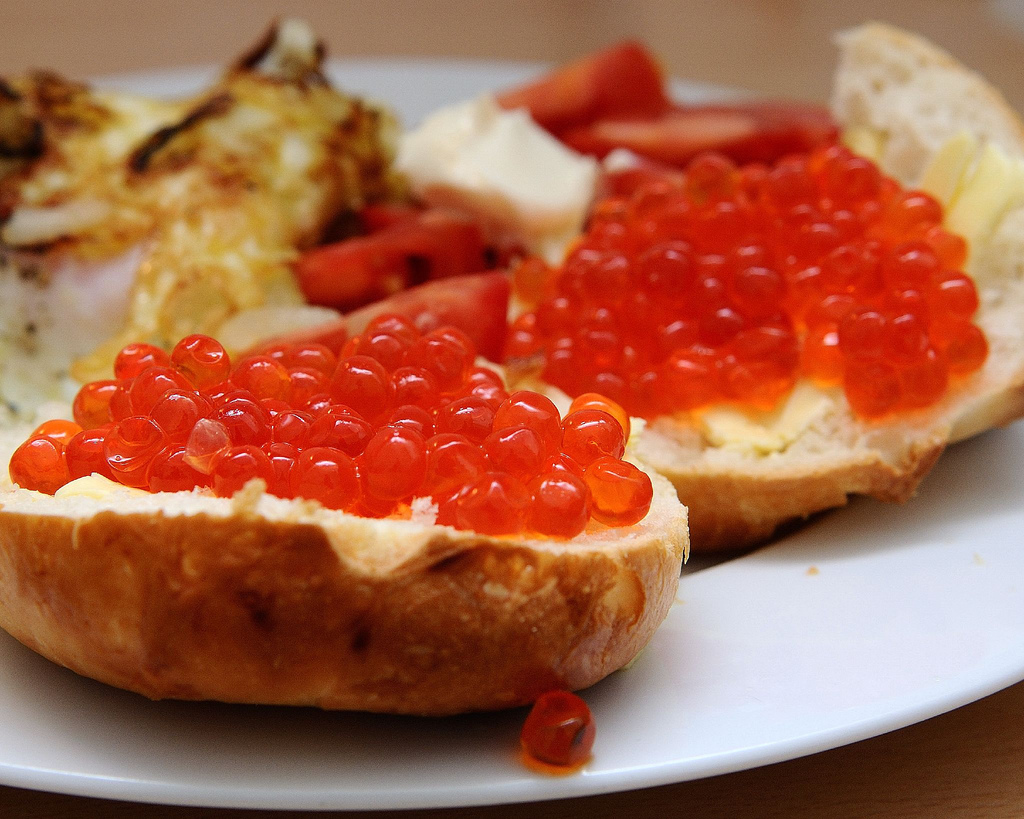
Caviar butterbrot

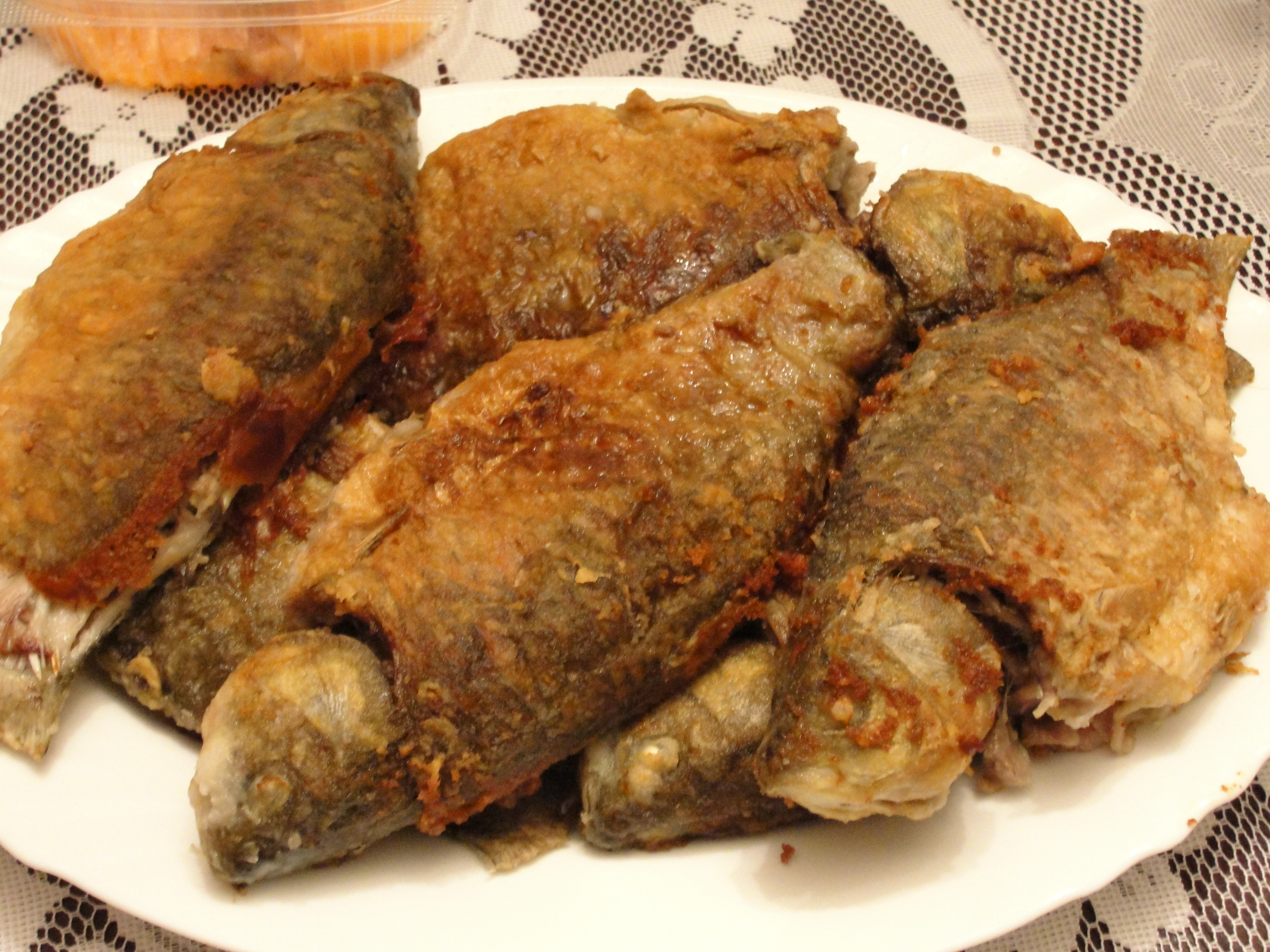
Pan-fried crucian carps

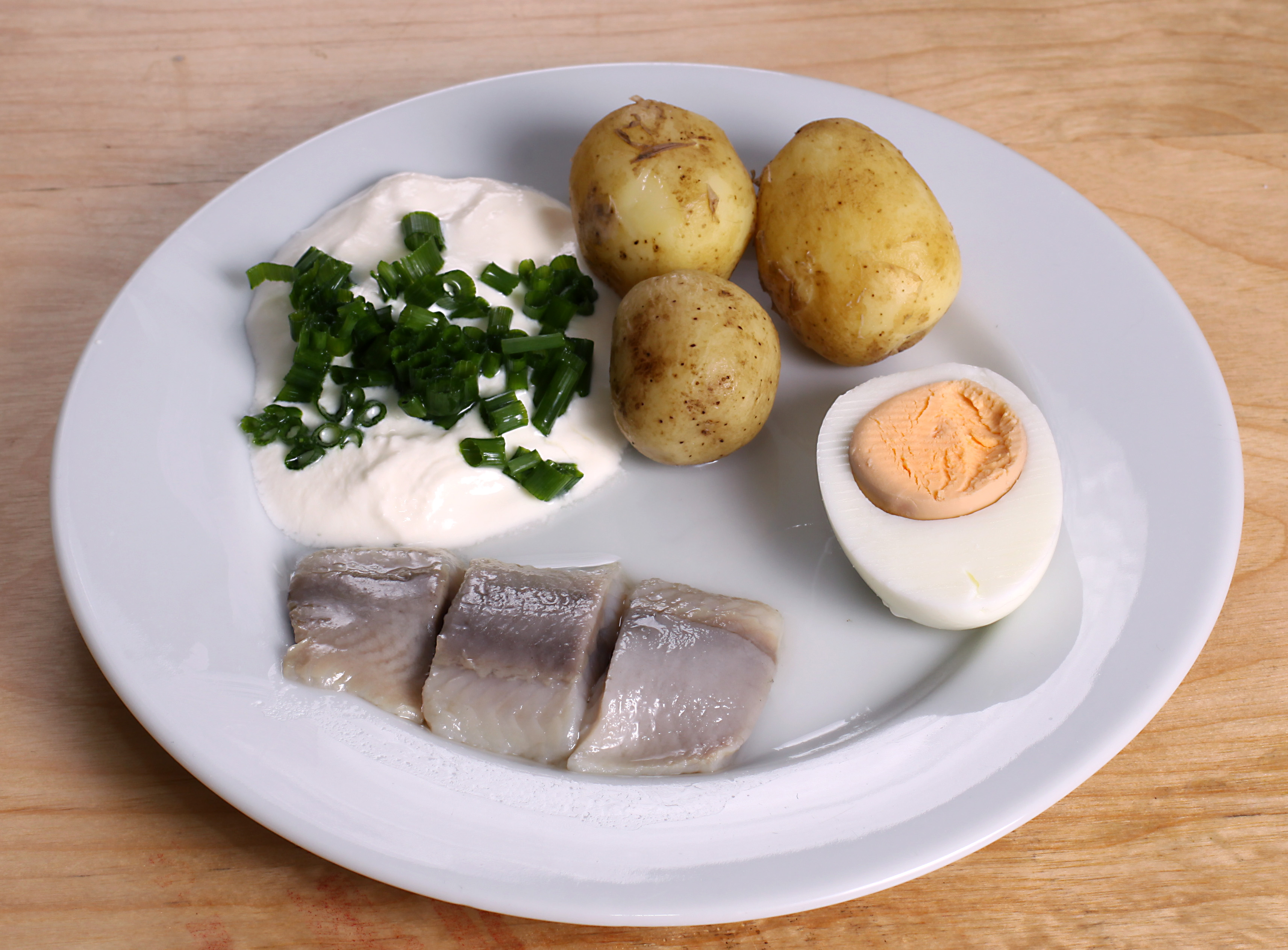
Pickled herring with sour cream, chives, potatoes and egg

==== Selyodka pod shuboi (dressed herring) ====
There is a dish in modern Russian cuisine resembling a mix of "svekolnik" and pickled herring: selyodka pod shuboi, literally "[fur]coated (dressed) herring", where pickled herring is coated with a layer of potatoes, a layer of mayo and/or smetana sour cream, with grated beet added on top for coating (hence "fur"-coat" word, shuba).

=== Vegetables ===
Cabbage, potatoes, and cold-tolerant greens are common in Russian and other Eastern European cuisines. Pickling cabbage (sauerkraut), cucumbers, tomatoes and other vegetables in brine is used to preserve vegetables for winter use. Pickled apples and some other fruit also used to be widely popular. These are sources of vitamins during periods when fresh fruit and vegetables are traditionally not available.

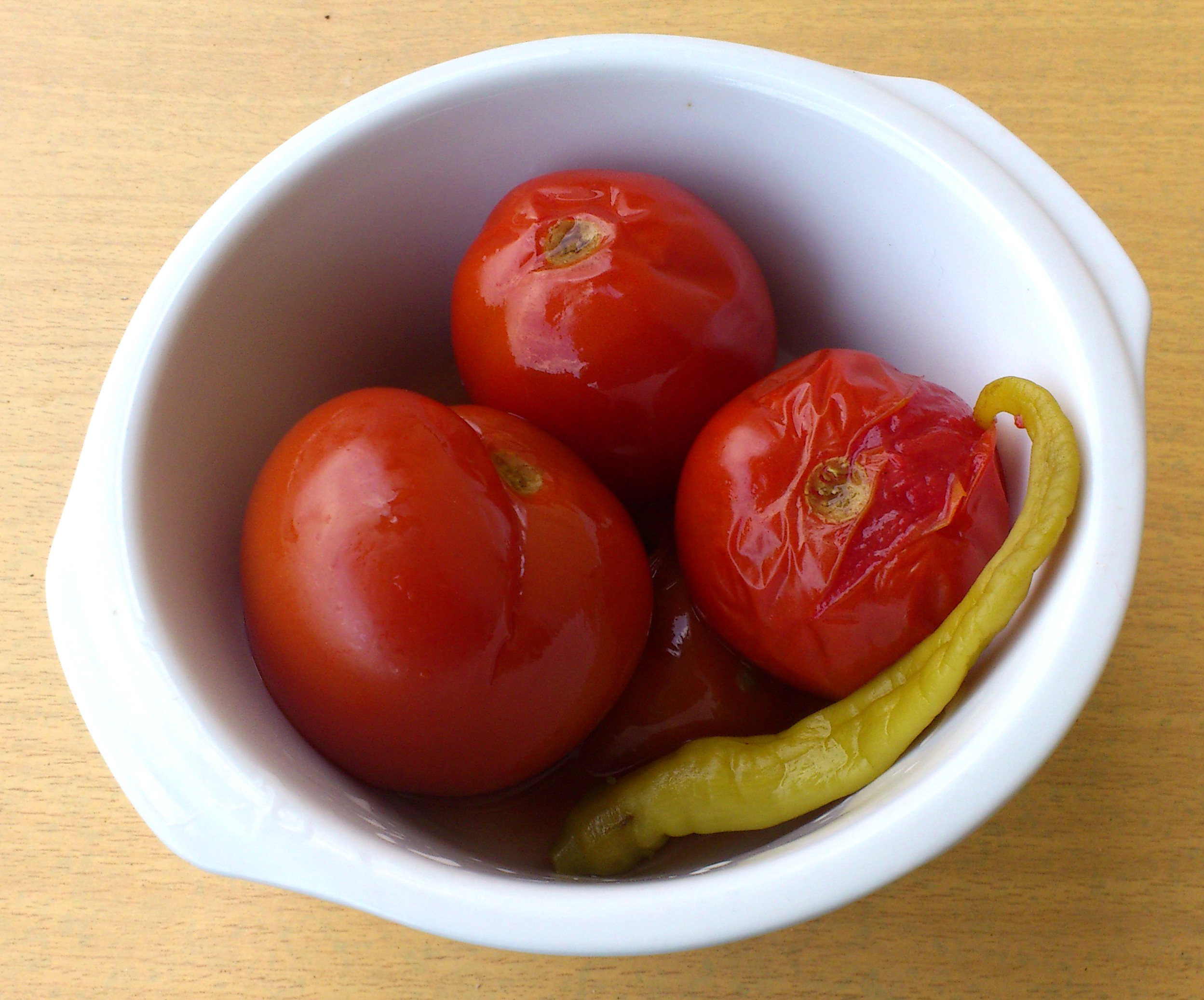
Pickled tomatoes

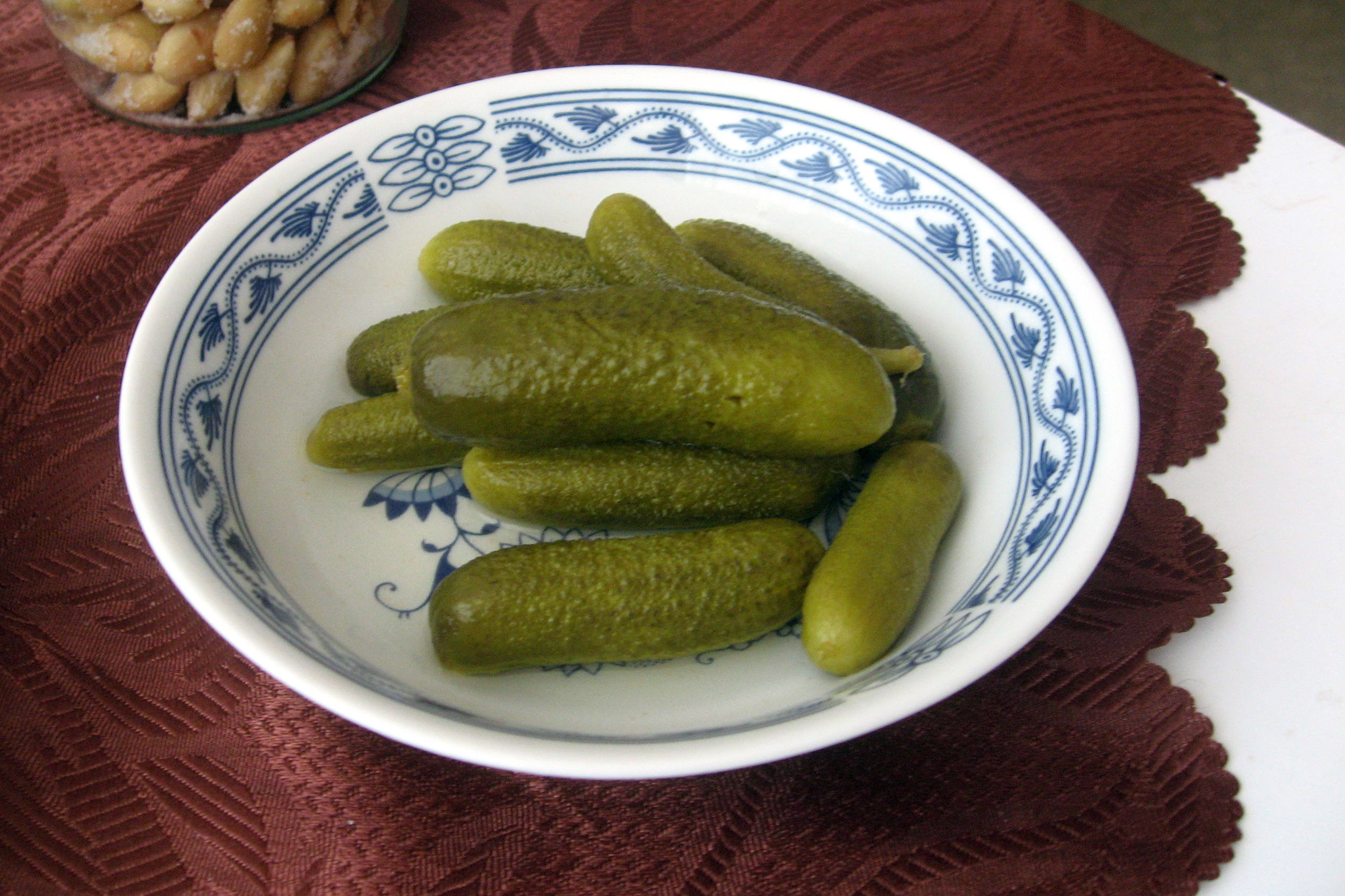
Pickles

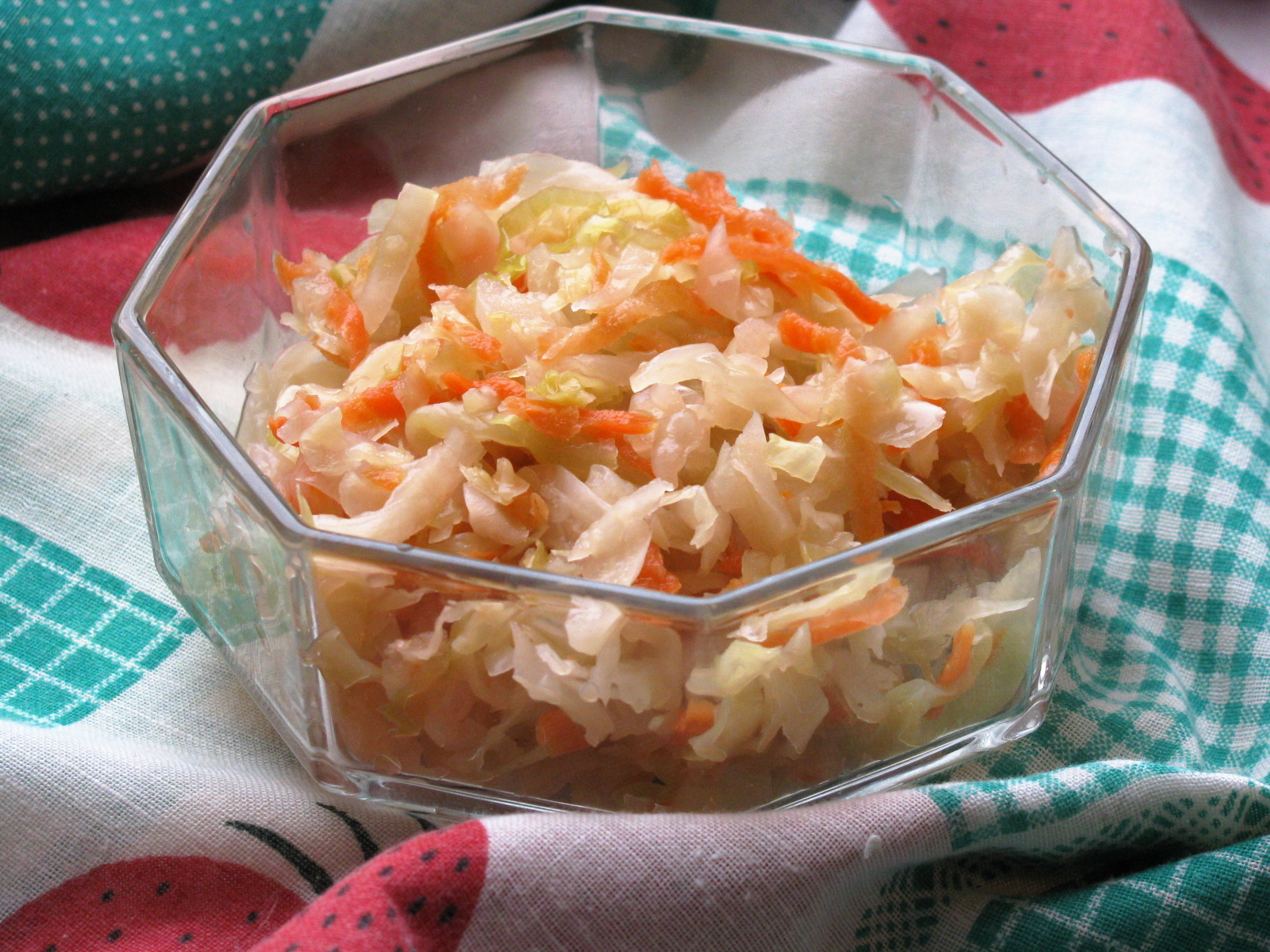
Eastern European-style sauerkraut

== Desserts and pastries ==
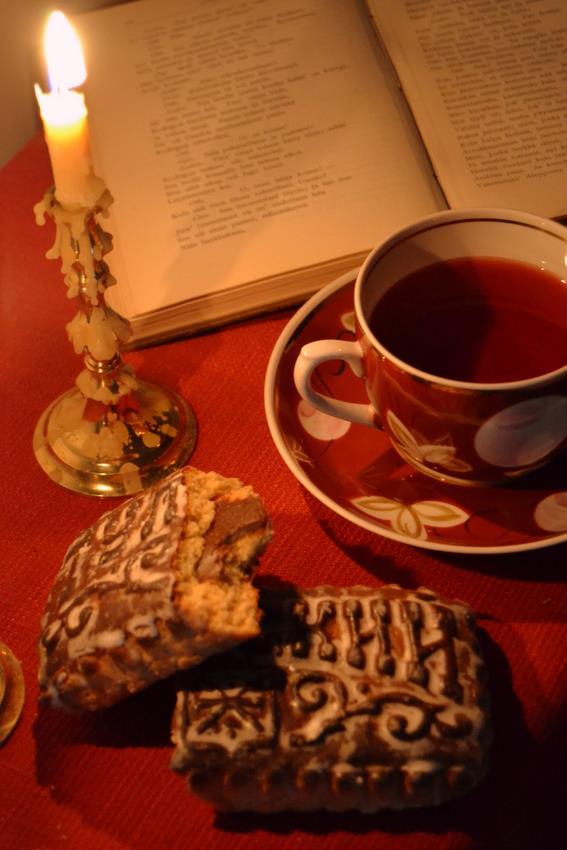
Tula gingerbread

The earliest form of the honey bread was made with just rye flour, honey and berry juice, arriving in Russia by way of Egypt in the 9th century. Later preparations dating to the 12th and 13th centuries included spices purchased in the markets of India and the Middle east. Tula gingerbread is known as early as 1685, and was historically made by well-known confectioners with gingerbread molds hand carved into planks of wood taken from local birch and pear trees. Vyazma gingerbread from the city of Vyazma is also popular.

Pirozhki (singular: pirozhok; diminutive of pirog [pie]) are small stuffed buns (pies) made of either yeast dough or short pastry. They are filled with one of many different fillings and are either baked (the ancient Slavic method) or shallow-fried (known as "priazhenie", this method was borrowed from the Tatars in the 13th century). One feature of pirozhki that sets them apart from, for example, English pies is that the fillings used are almost invariably fully cooked. The use of chopped hard-boiled eggs in fillings is another interesting feature. Six typical fillings for traditional pirozhki are:

1. Chopped boiled meat mixed with sautéed onions
2. Rice and boiled eggs with dill
3. Fish sautéed with onions and mixed with hard-boiled chopped eggs and rice
4. Mashed potatoes mixed with dill and green onion
5. Sautéed cabbage
6. Sautéed mushrooms with onions and sometimes carrots

Polish pierogi (type: dumplings) are not really related to Russian "pirogi" (type: pies) and "pirozhki" (type: buns, small pies)

Blin are thin griddle cakes similar to crepes traditionally made with buckwheat flour and yeasted batter, although non-yeasted batter has become widespread in recent times. They may be topped or filled with butter, smetana (sour cream), fruit preserves or caviar. Blini are often served in connection with Maslenitsa (Масленица, Butter Week; also known as Pancake Week), a springtime religious festival celebrated before Lent, but it is also a common breakfast dish. The word "blin" (singular of blini) comes from Old Slavic "mlin", which means "to mill".

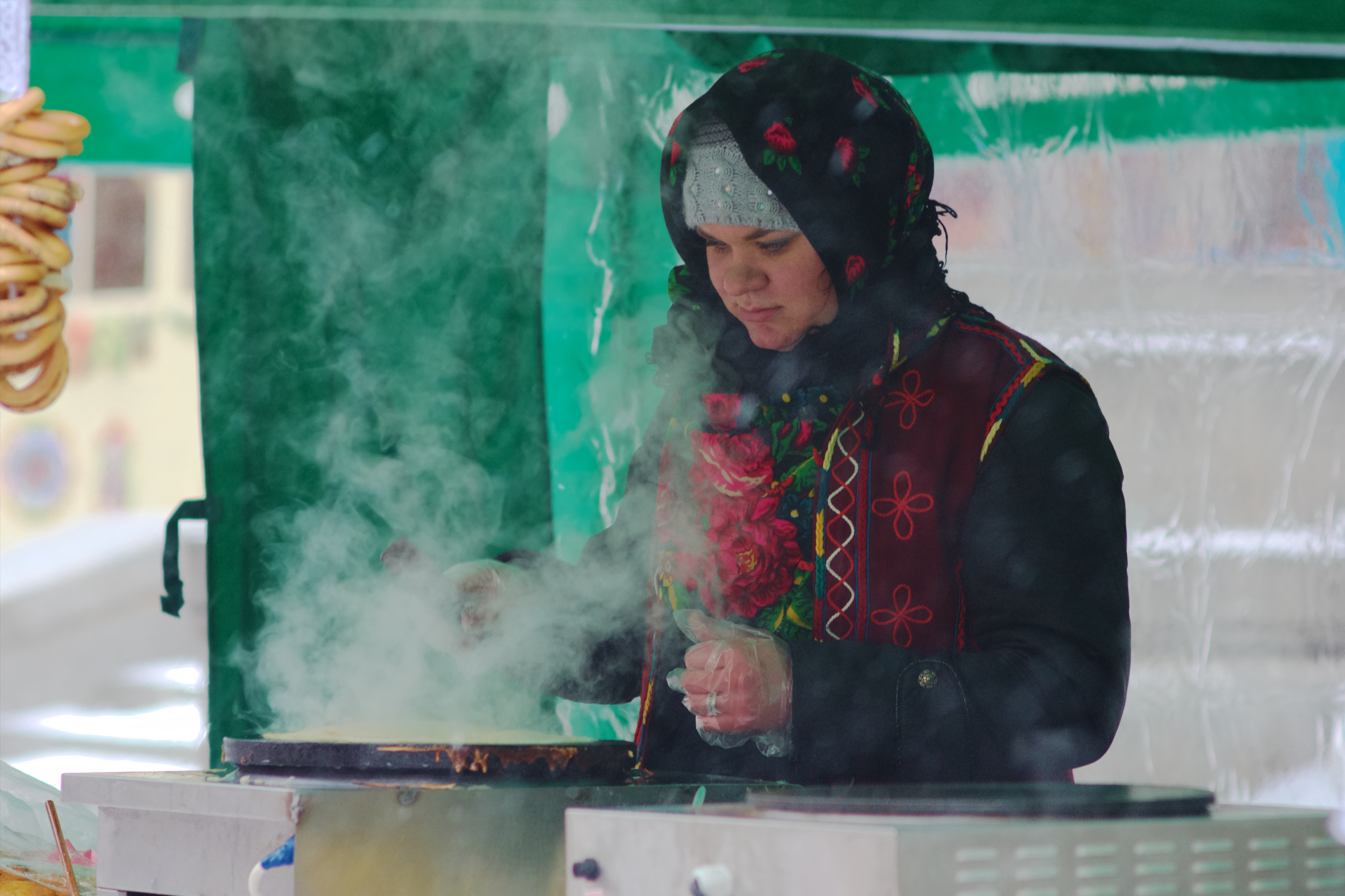
Blini are prepared for the maslenitsa festival.

Blin had a somewhat ritual significance for early Slavic peoples in pre-Christian times since they were a symbol of the sun, due to their round form. They were traditionally prepared at the end of the winter to honor the rebirth of the new sun during Maslenitsa. This tradition was adopted by the Orthodox Church and is carried on to the present day, as the last week of dairy and egg products before Lent. Bliny are still often served at wakes, to commemorate the recently deceased. Blini can be made from wheat, buckwheat, or other grains, although wheat blini are most popular in Russia. The word "blin" is also often used as a soft curse word, expressing frustration. This practice originates from the word's phonetic similarity to the much more vulgar word "Blyádt".

Syrniki are fried curd fritters, garnished with sour cream, jam, honey or applesauce.

Vatrushka is a kind of cake with a ring of dough and tvorog (cottage cheese) in the middle, often with raisins or bits of fruit, from about five inches to two and a half feet in diameter.

Kulich is a kind of Easter bread that is traditional in the Orthodox Christian faith and is eaten in countries like Russia, Belarus, Ukraine, Bulgaria, Romania, Georgia, Moldova, North Macedonia and Serbia.

Traditionally after the Easter service, the kulich, which has been put into a basket and decorated with colorful flowers, is blessed by the priest. Blessed kulich is eaten before breakfast each day. Any leftover kulich that is not blessed is eaten with Paskha for dessert.

Kulich is baked in tall, cylindrical tins (like coffee or fruit juice tins). When cooled, kulich is decorated with white icing (which slightly drizzles down the sides) and colorful flowers. Historically, it was often served with cheese paska bearing the symbol XB (from the traditional Easter greeting of Христос воскресе, "Christ is Risen").

Kulich is only eaten between Easter and Pentecost.

The recipe for kulich is similar to that of Italian panettone.

Paskha is a festive dish made in Eastern Orthodox countries which consists of food that is forbidden during the fast of Great Lent. It is made during Holy Week and then brought to Church on Great Saturday to be blessed after the Paschal Vigil. The name of the dish comes from Pascha, the Eastern Orthodox celebration of Easter.

Cheese paskha is a traditional Easter dish made from quark (curd cheese, Russian: творог, romanized: tvorog), which is white, symbolizing the purity of Christ, the Paschal Lamb, and the joy of the Resurrection. It is formed in a mould, traditionally in the shape of a truncated pyramid (a symbol of the Church; this form is also said to represent the Tomb of Christ). It is usually served as an accompaniment to a rich Easter bread called paska in Ukrainian and kulich in Russian.

The pascha is decorated with traditional religious symbols, such as the "Chi Ro" motif, a three-bar cross, and the letters X and B (Cyrillic letters which stands for Христосъ Воскресе. This is the Slavonic form of the traditional Paschal greeting: "Christ is Risen!"). All of these religious decorations symbolize Christ's Passion and Resurrection.

Varenye is a dessert and condiment. It is made from cooking fruits or berries. It is similar to jam except that fruits are not macerated and the consistency is more akin to fruit within syrup. It is used as a topping for crepes and syrniki and as a sweetener for tea. It is also eaten on its own as a sweet.

Pastila is a fruit confectionery (pâte de fruits). It has been described as "small squares of pressed fruit paste" and "light, airy puffs with a delicate apple flavor". In Imperial Russia, the "small jellied sweetmeats" were served for tea "with a white foamy top, a bit like marshmallow, but tasting of pure fruit". In its modern form, it is essentially fruit meringue, but baked to a soft, not crisp consistency. Unlike its derivative zefir, true pastila does not use gelling agents and has a much lower egg white content.

Zefir (may also be spelled zephyr or zephir) is a type of soft confectionery made by whipping fruit and berry purée (mostly apple puree) with sugar and egg whites with subsequent addition of a gelling agent like pectin, carrageenan, agar, or gelatine. It is commonly produced and sold in the countries of the former Soviet Union. The name given after the Greek god of the light west wind Zephyr symbolizes its delicate airy consistency.

Zefir is somewhat similar in its consistency to marshmallows, Schokokuss or krembo. It is derived from the traditional Russian pastila but with added egg white foam and a gelling agent. The form typically resembles traditional meringue. However, in contrast to commercial meringue, it is never crisp. It is usually of white or rose color.

Chocolate-coated versions are also widespread. In contrast to the other chocolate-coated marshmallow-like confectioneries they normally do not include a biscuit layer.

Kissel or kisel is a viscous fruit dish, popular as a dessert and as a drink. It consists of the sweetened juice of berries, like mors, but it is thickened with cornstarch, potato starch or arrowroot; sometimes red wine or fresh or dried fruits are added. It is similar to the Danish rødgrød and German Rote Grütze. Swedish blåbärssoppa is a similarly prepared bilberry dessert, although only fresh or frozen bilberries, not dried berries are used to prepare it.

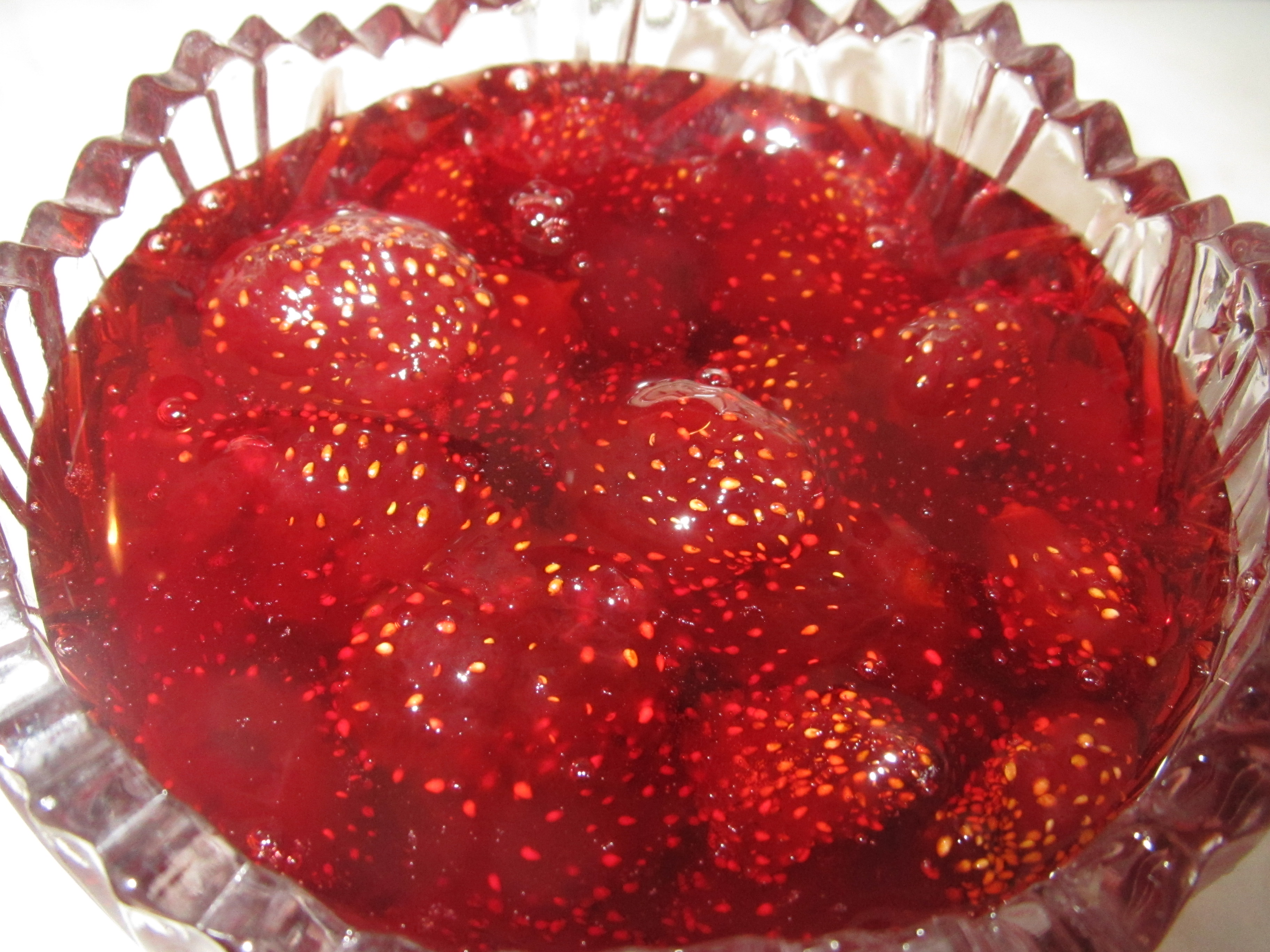
Varenye

Kissel can be served either hot or cold, also together with sweetened quark or semolina pudding. Kissel can also be served on pancakes or with ice cream. If the kissel is made using less thickening starch, it can be drunk—this is common in Russia and Ukraine.

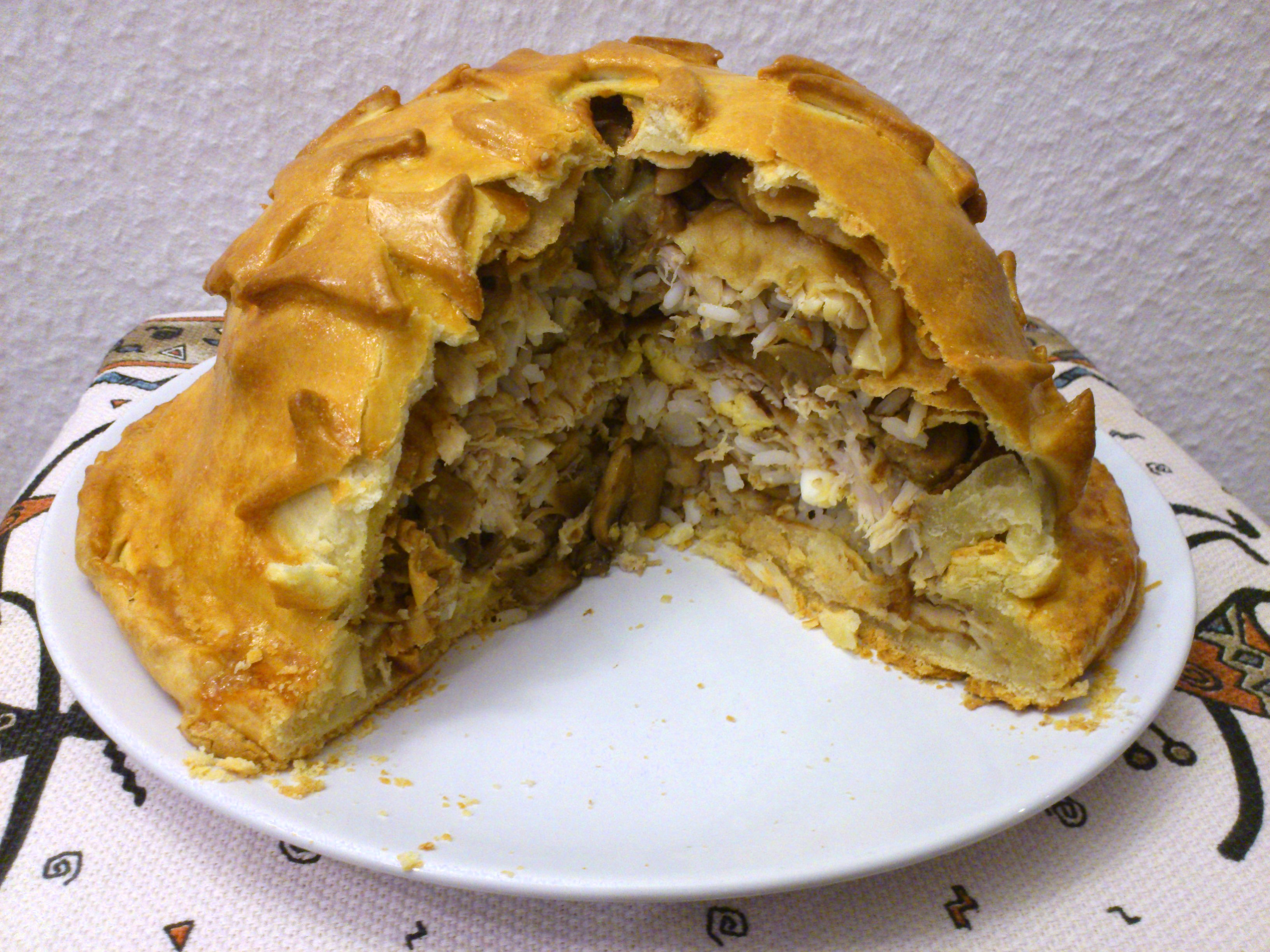
Kurnik (pirog)

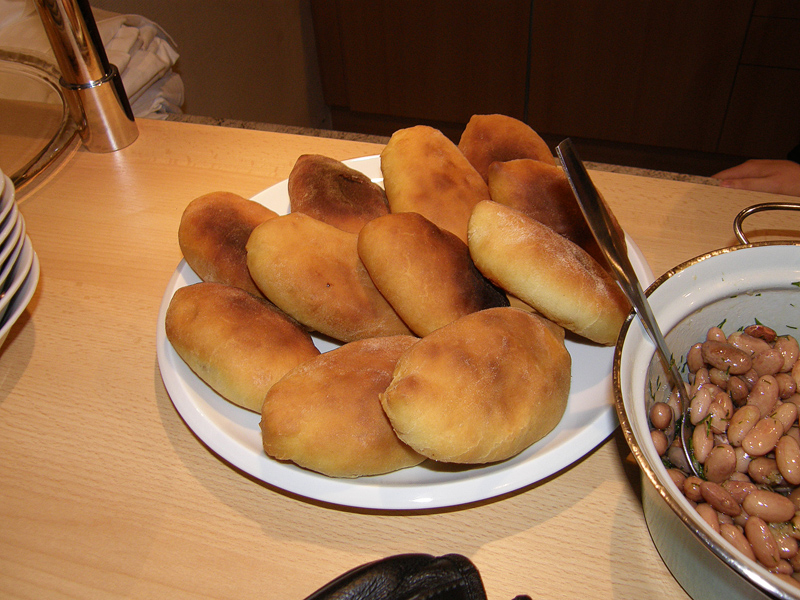
Pirozhki

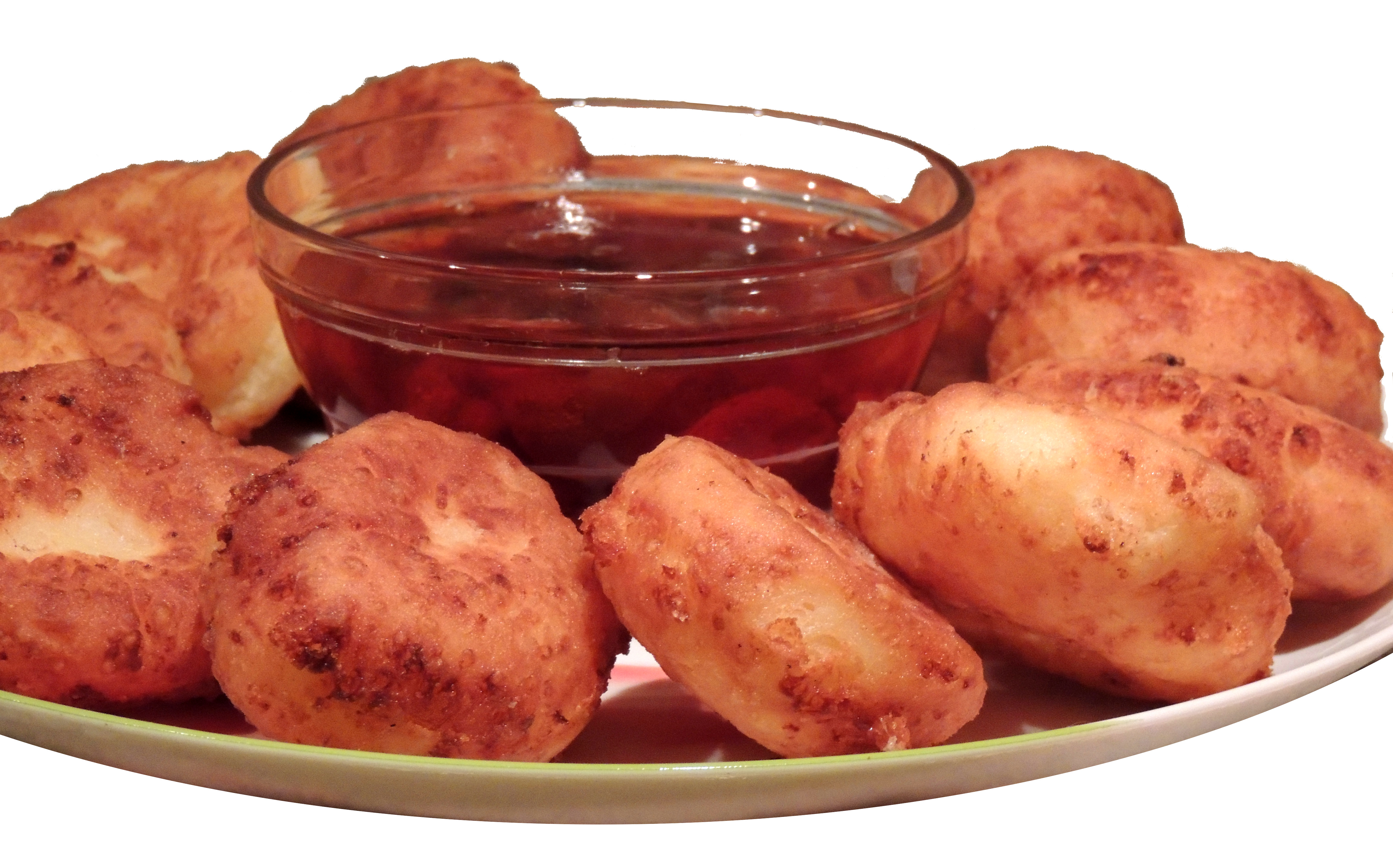
Syrniki served with varenye

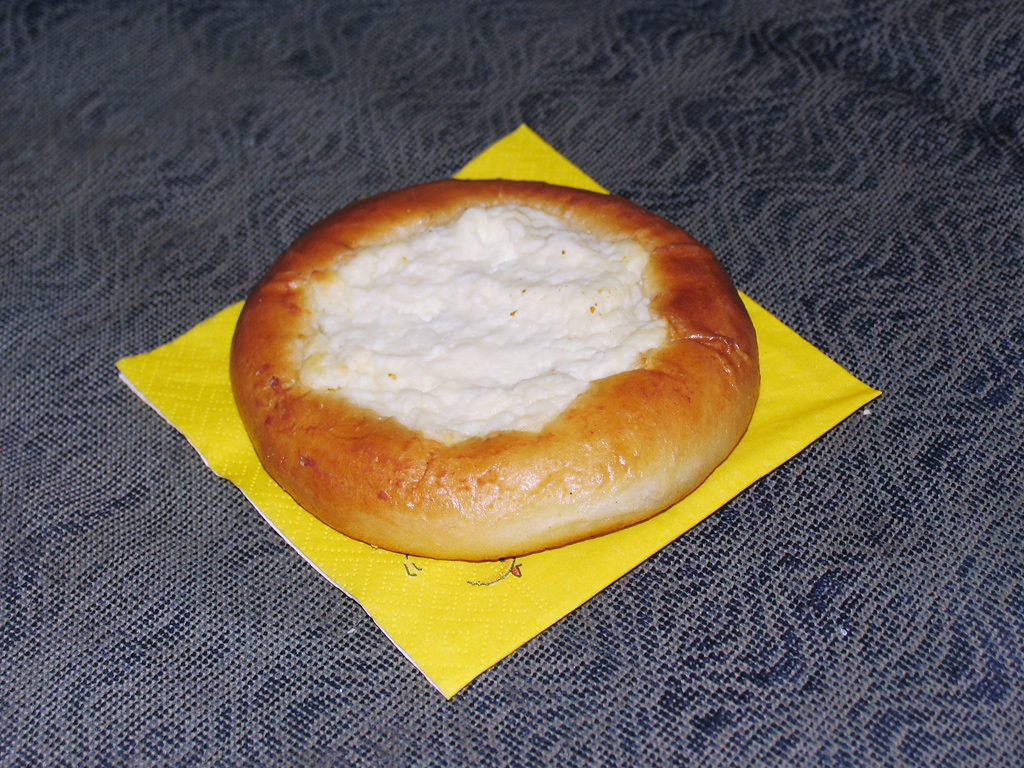
Vatrushka

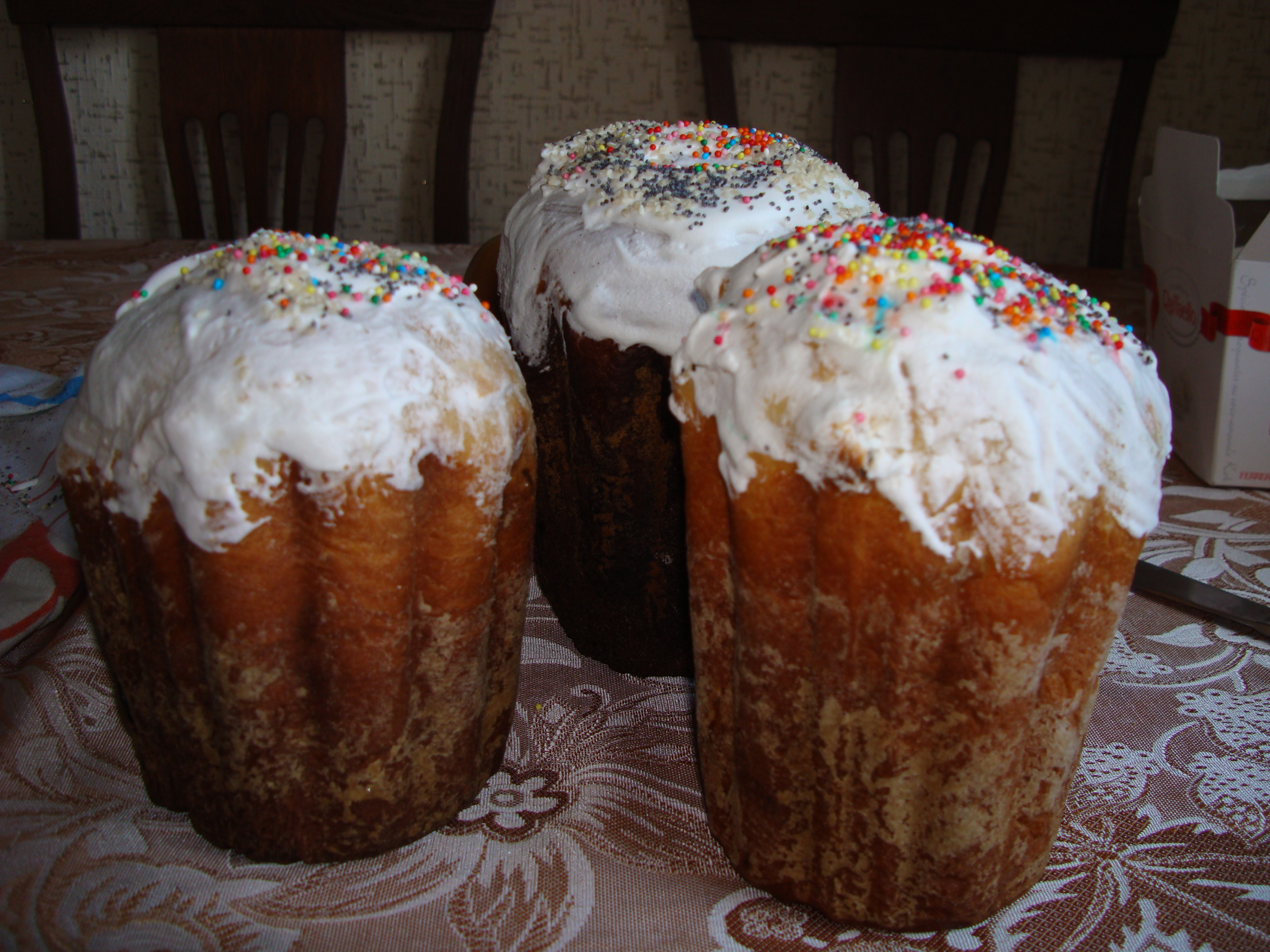
Kulich

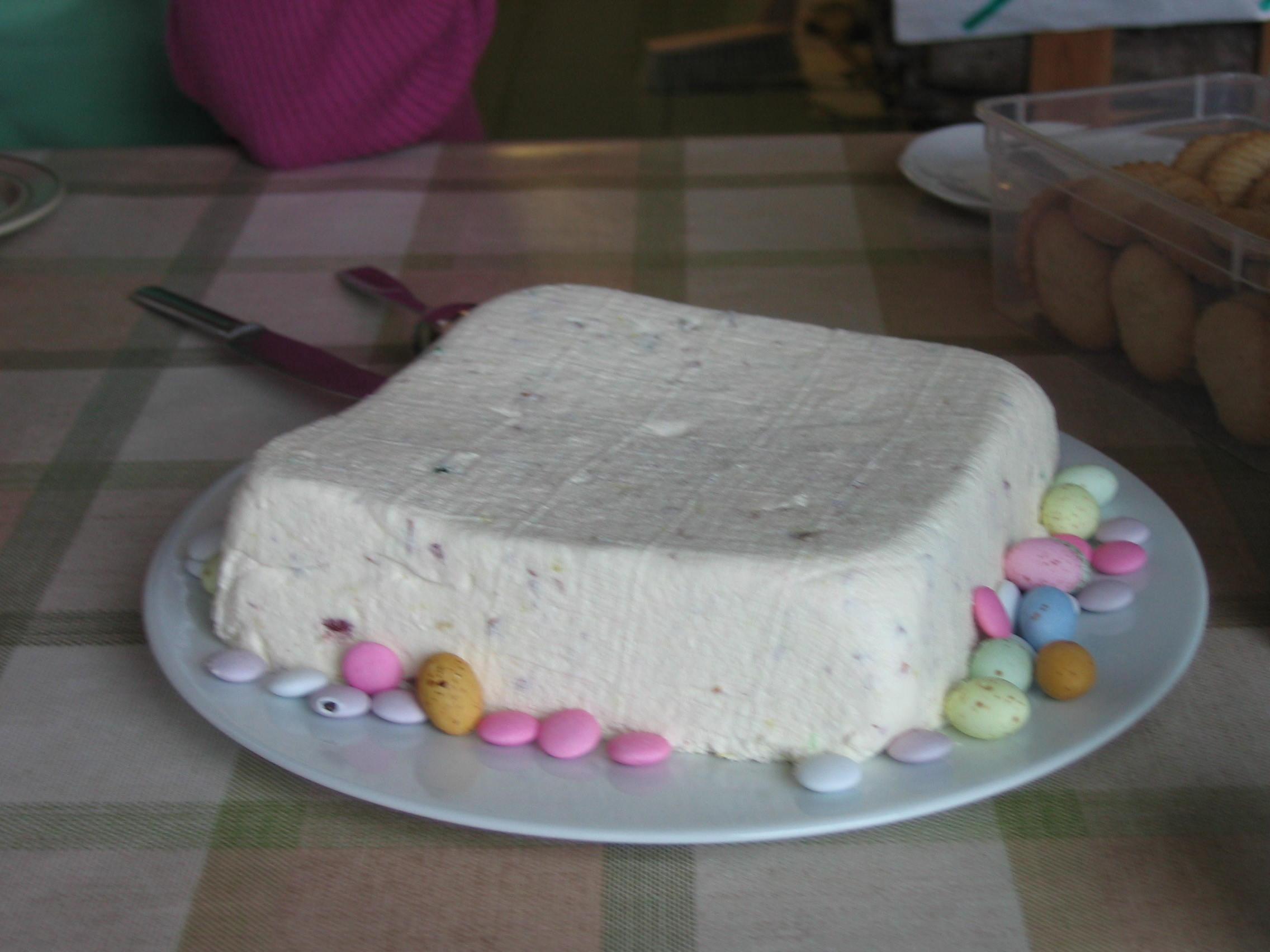
Paskha

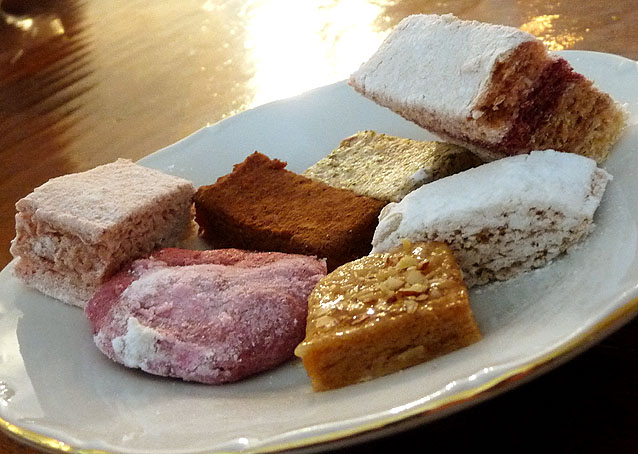
Pastila

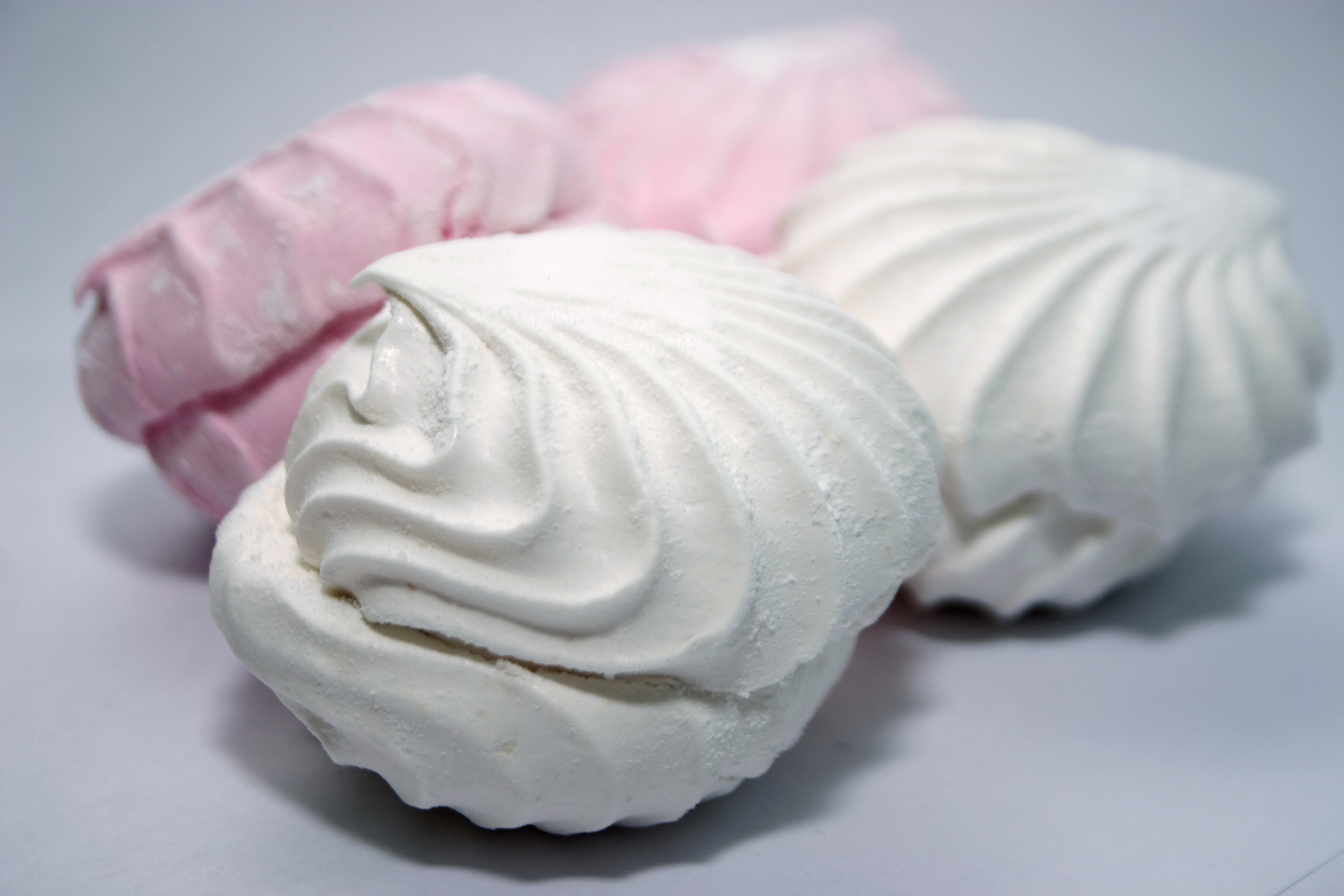
Zefir

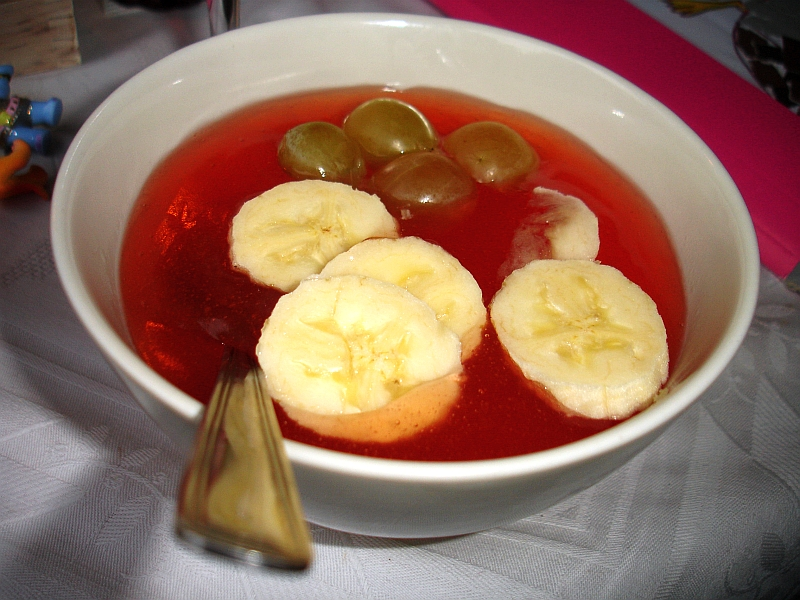
Kissel served with bananas and grapes

== Beverages ==
Many traditional drinks are indigenous to Russia and are not present in other national cuisines. The most notable of these are vodka, sbiten', kvass, medovukha and mors. Many of them are no longer common and have been replaced by drinks originating in Europe. Nonetheless, these beverages were formerly drunk as a complement to meat and poultry dishes, sweet porridge, and dessert. Of particular note is sbiten, an immensely popular medieval drink which has since been replaced by tea as the Russian mainstay beverage.

=== Alcohol ===
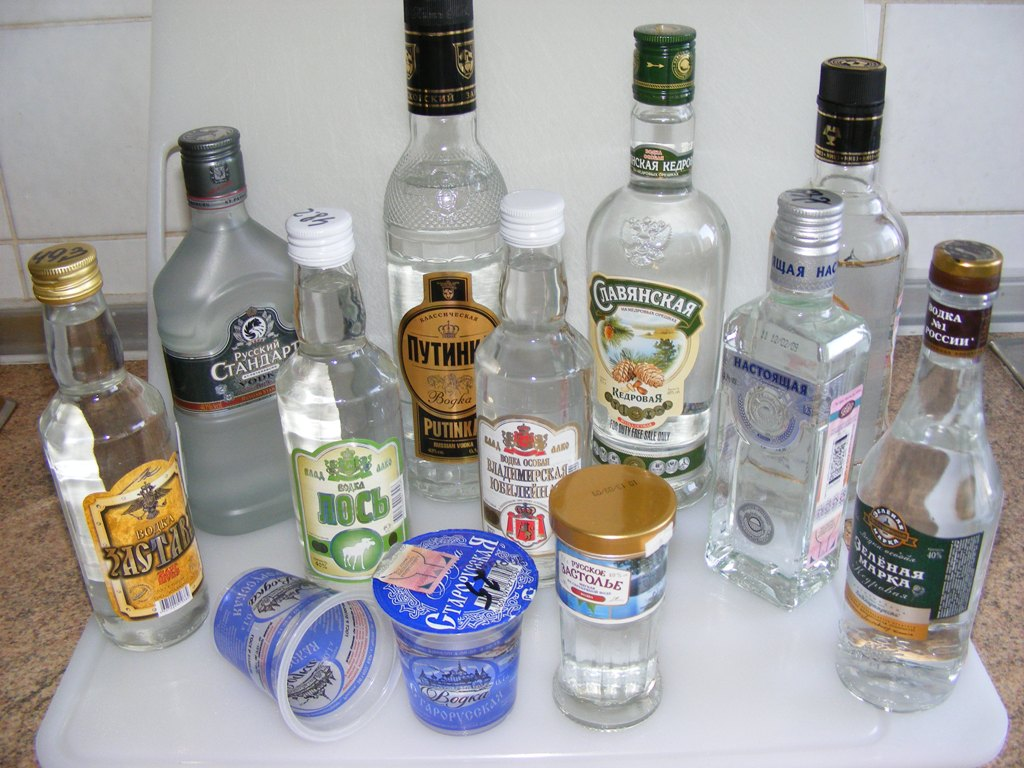
Russian vodkas in various bottles and cups

Of Russia's alcoholic beverages, perhaps the most ancient is Medovukha, a sweet, low-alcohol drink, made with fermented honey with the addition of various spices. A stronger honey-based beverage, stavlenniy myod, also exists in Russia and is broadly equivalent to Scandinavian mead; it is typically made with the admixture of berry juices.

Vodka is the best known of Russia's alcoholic products and is produced, with some variation, throughout the country. Vodka can be either grain or potato based and is frequently flavored with a great variety of ingredients ranging from hot-pepper and horseradish to fruits and berries.

Beer has been manufactured in Russia since at the very least the 9th century. Its popularity was for many centuries concentrated in the Lands of Novgorod. Beer continued to be made throughout Russian history, but real growth came in the 18th century when many breweries were founded in order to supply the newly modernized and expanded imperial army and fleet. A real explosion in the popularity of beer came in the last decades of the Soviet Era and has continued into the present day, with Russia now ranking as the fourth largest producer in the world.

Wine is manufactured in the southern regions in the country but lags far behind other alcoholic beverages in popularity. The wine industry, which was somewhat notable in imperial times, is slowly expanding, but most Russians that drink wine tend to prefer imported foreign varieties, especially sweet varieties produced in the countries of the former USSR and little known in the outside world.

=== Non-alcohol drinks ===
Most non-alcoholic Russian drinks are based on fruits and berries. Those include kompot, made by boiling fruit with sweetened water; uzvar, in which dried fruit is used instead; mors, made of berries such as lingonberry, cranberry, blueberries, or raspberries; and kisel, a viscous fruit drink thickened with cornstarch, potato starch or arrowroot.

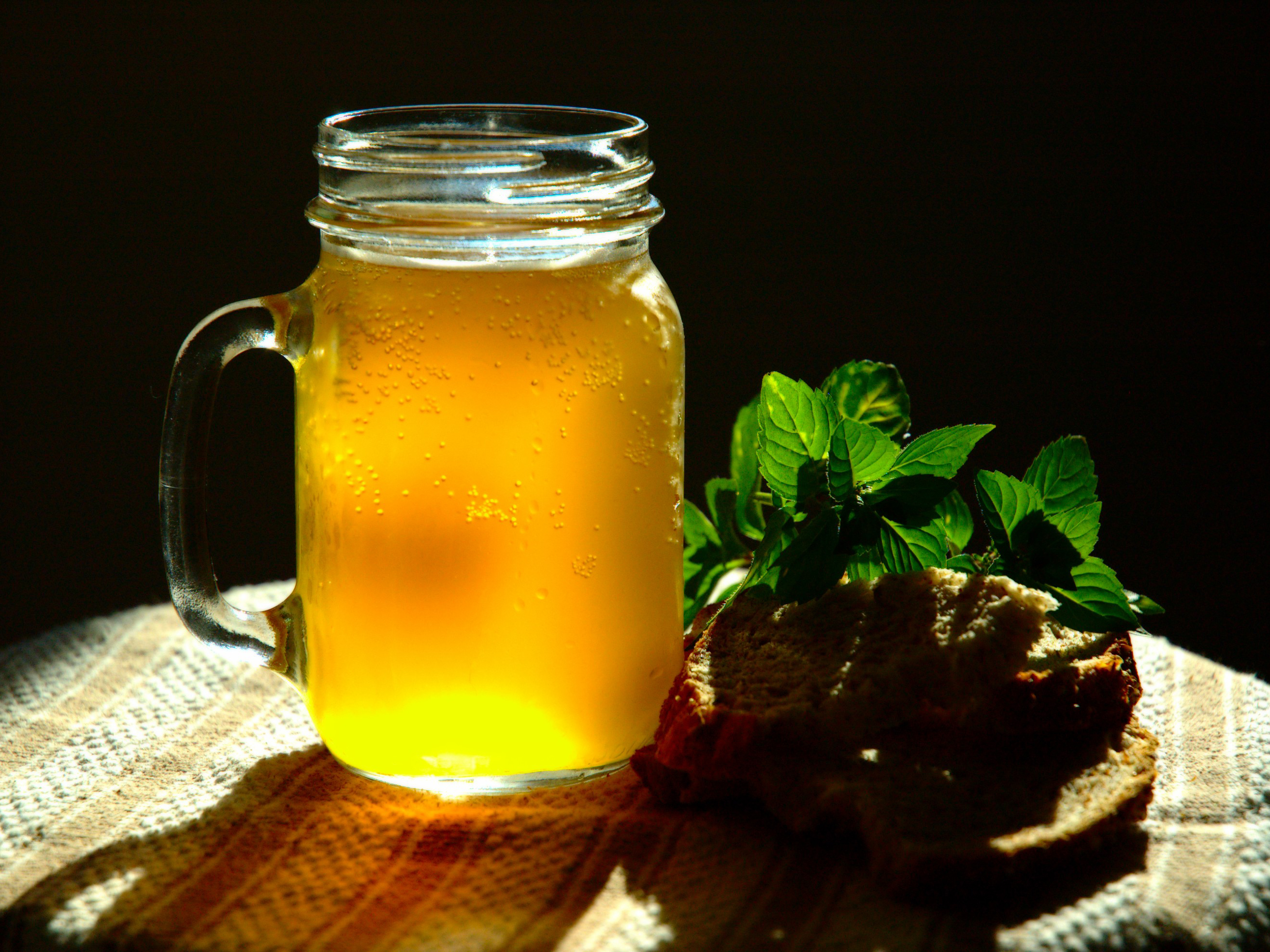
Kvass is a bread-based drink and a key ingredient in many soups.

Kvass is an ancient and still widely popular bread-based drink. The basic method of preparing kvass includes water, flour and liquid malt; these ingredients are used to make a dough that is subjected to fermentation. This results in a beverage with very low alcohol content. Commercial kvass is often around 0.5% alcohol. The fermented liquid, referred to as "zator", is diluted with water and mixed with yeast, sugar, and aromatic additives. This final mixture is allowed to brew for several days. Flavor additives may include fruit and berry juices (cherry, raspberry, lemon, etc.), as well as ginger and mint.

Sbiten, another non-alcoholic drink, is made of honey, water, fruit juices, and spices. Sbiten was once the most popular non-alcoholic beverage in the country, but in the last few centuries, it has been superseded and largely replaced by tea and coffee.

Tea is by far the most common drink in almost all parts of Russia. First introduced from China in the 17th century, its popularity has since spread throughout the country. Black tea has always been the dominant variety, but after the Russian acquisition of Central Asia, awareness of and interest in green tea began to increase slowly. Today Russia remains one of the largest tea consumers in the world. Russian Caravan is perhaps the most well-known type of Russian tea around the world.

Until the Sino-Soviet split, tea was mostly brought in from China. Now, Russia imports most of its tea from India and Sri Lanka, with Darjeeling being the most prized variety. Domestic cultivation exists in the southern regions of the country (mostly in Krasnodar Krai), but local supply is very limited compared to national consumption.

Coffee is also popular but has never caught up to tea in popularity. Peter the Great is credited with introducing coffee to Russia, with the drink becoming steadily more pervasive since that time. Coffee is commonly made either using the Turkish, or common European methods.

== Gallery ==
Russian cuisine on a postage stamp sheet of Russia

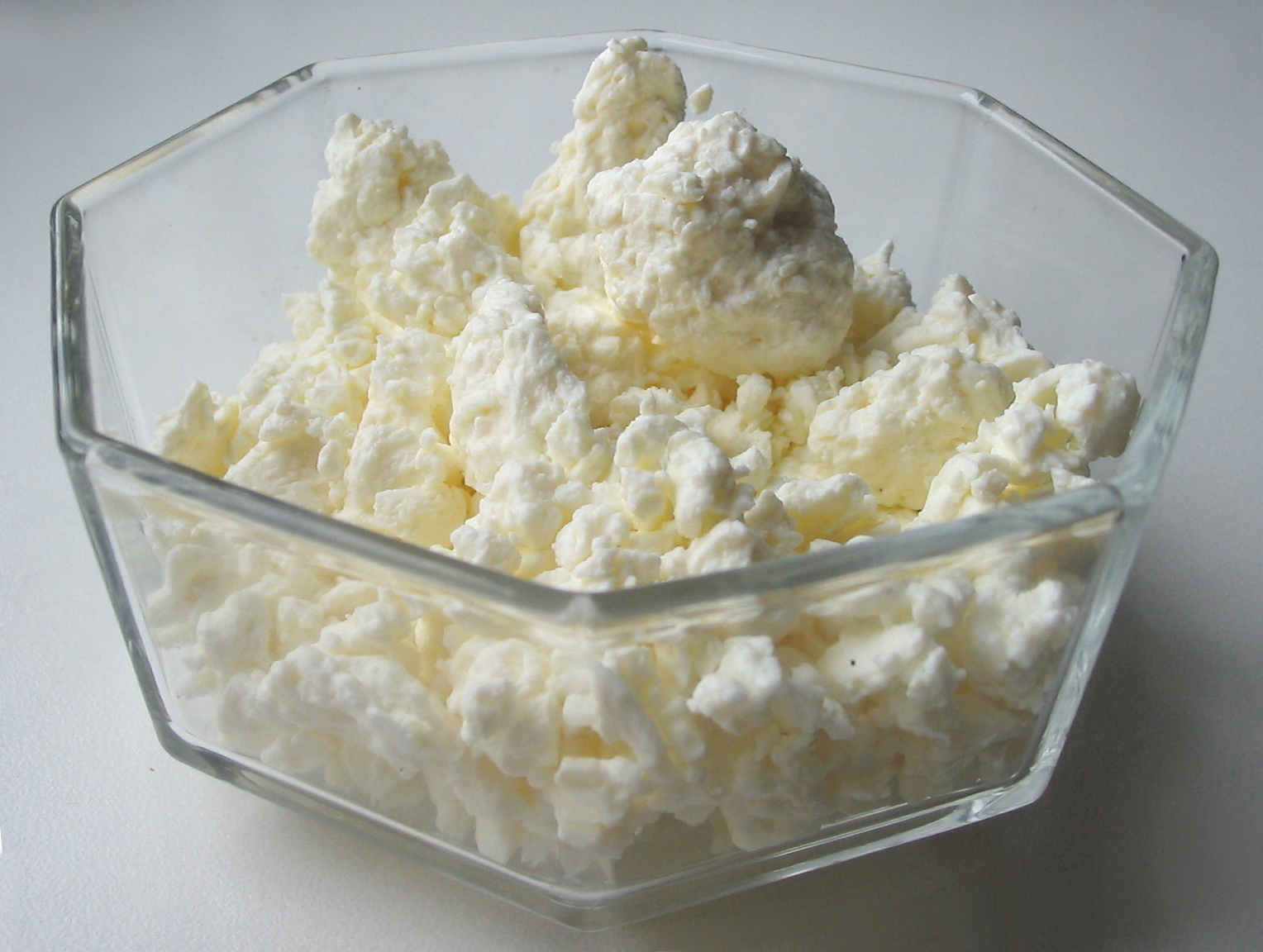
Russian tvorog cheese

== See also ==
- A Gift to Young Housewives, a well-known 19th-century Russian cookbook
- List of Russian dishes
- List of Russian desserts
- List of Russian restaurants
- Pirog
- Ukrainian cuisine
- Cossacks cuisine
