= Baba-sharpanyna =

Ukrainian dish

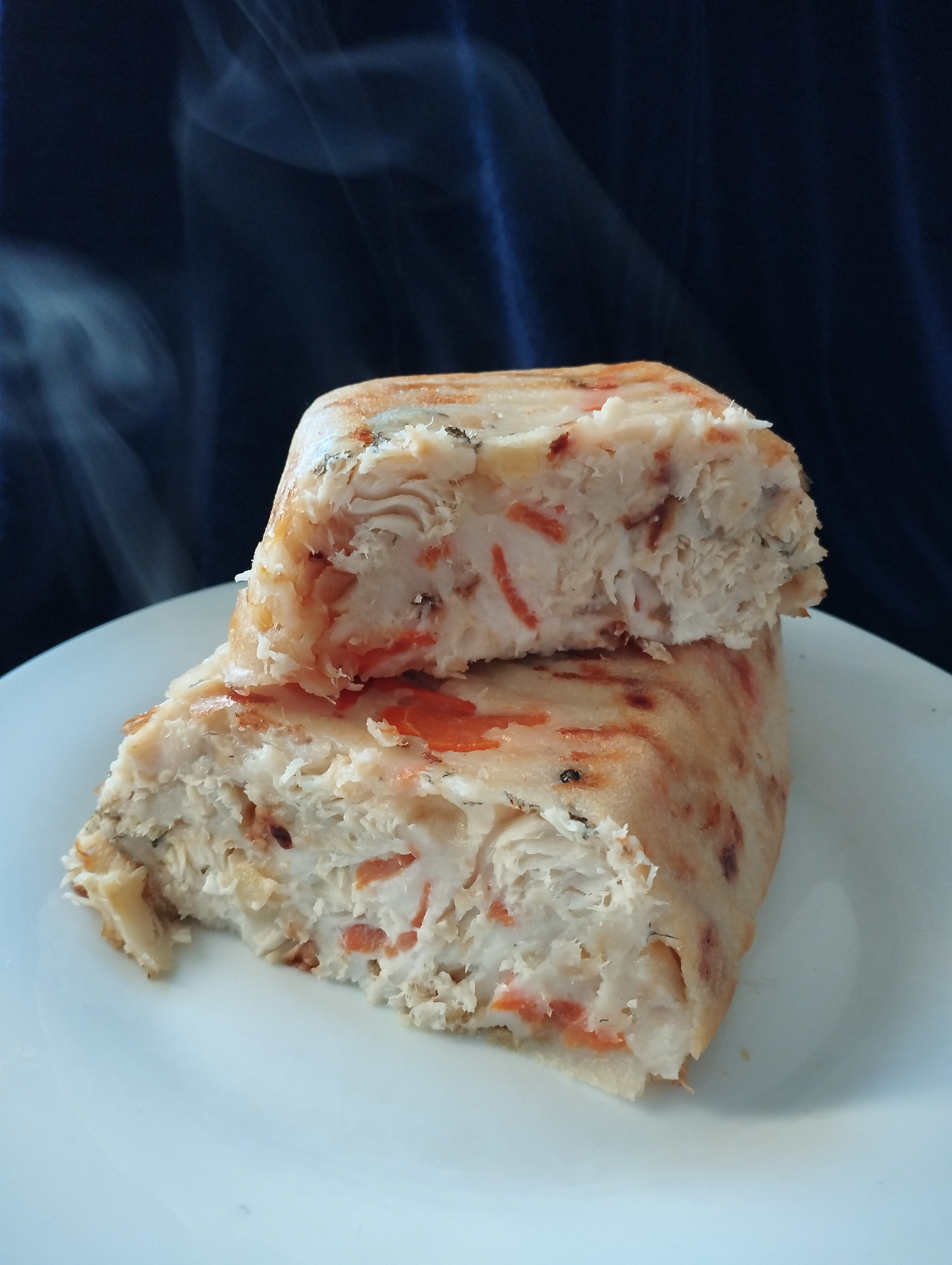
- Type: casserole
- Course: main course
- Place of origin: Ukraine
- Serving temperature: hot or cold
- Main ingredients: flour, fish broth, fish, onion, carrot, oil

Baba-sharpanyna (Ukrainian: Баба-шарпанина) is a Ukrainian dish, a fish casserole. The name comes from the word "sharpaty" meaning to tear or shred. Pieces of fish (roach, pike, perch, or bream) are coated in batter, fried butter, and onions, and baked. Some sources refer to baba-sharpanina as a type of oladyi. This dish is mentioned by I. Kotlyarevsky in his Eneida.

== Preparation ==
The fish is cleaned, washed, deboned, cut into pieces, and simmered until tender with parsley, carrots, bay leaves, pepper, salt, and onions. Sift the flour into a saucepan, add lightly fried onions in vegetable oil, gradually add the broth the fish was cooked in, and mix into a thick, sour cream-like dough. The cooked fish is divided into small pieces, sprinkled with pepper, placed in greased dishes, covered with the prepared dough, and baked in the oven.

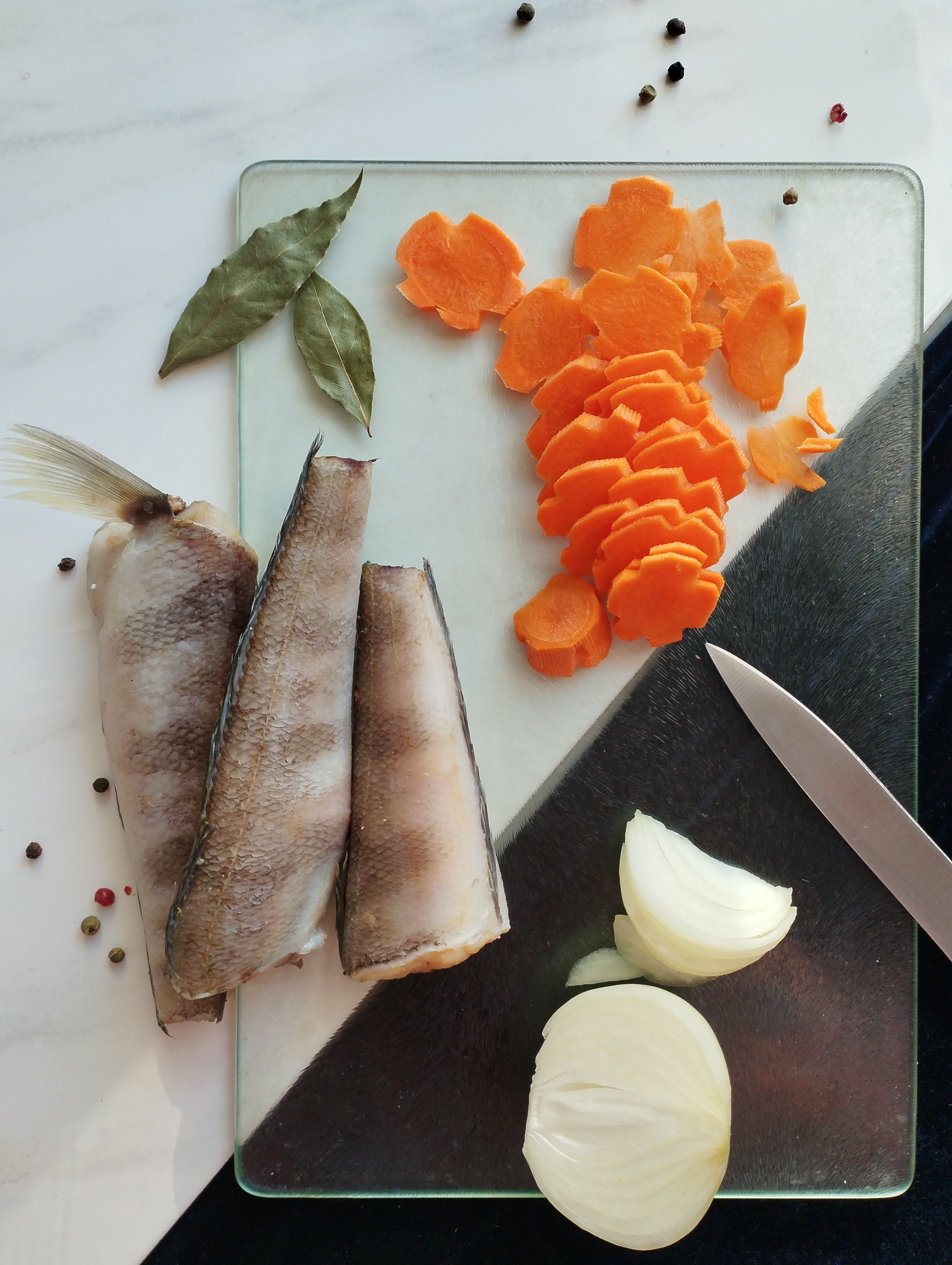

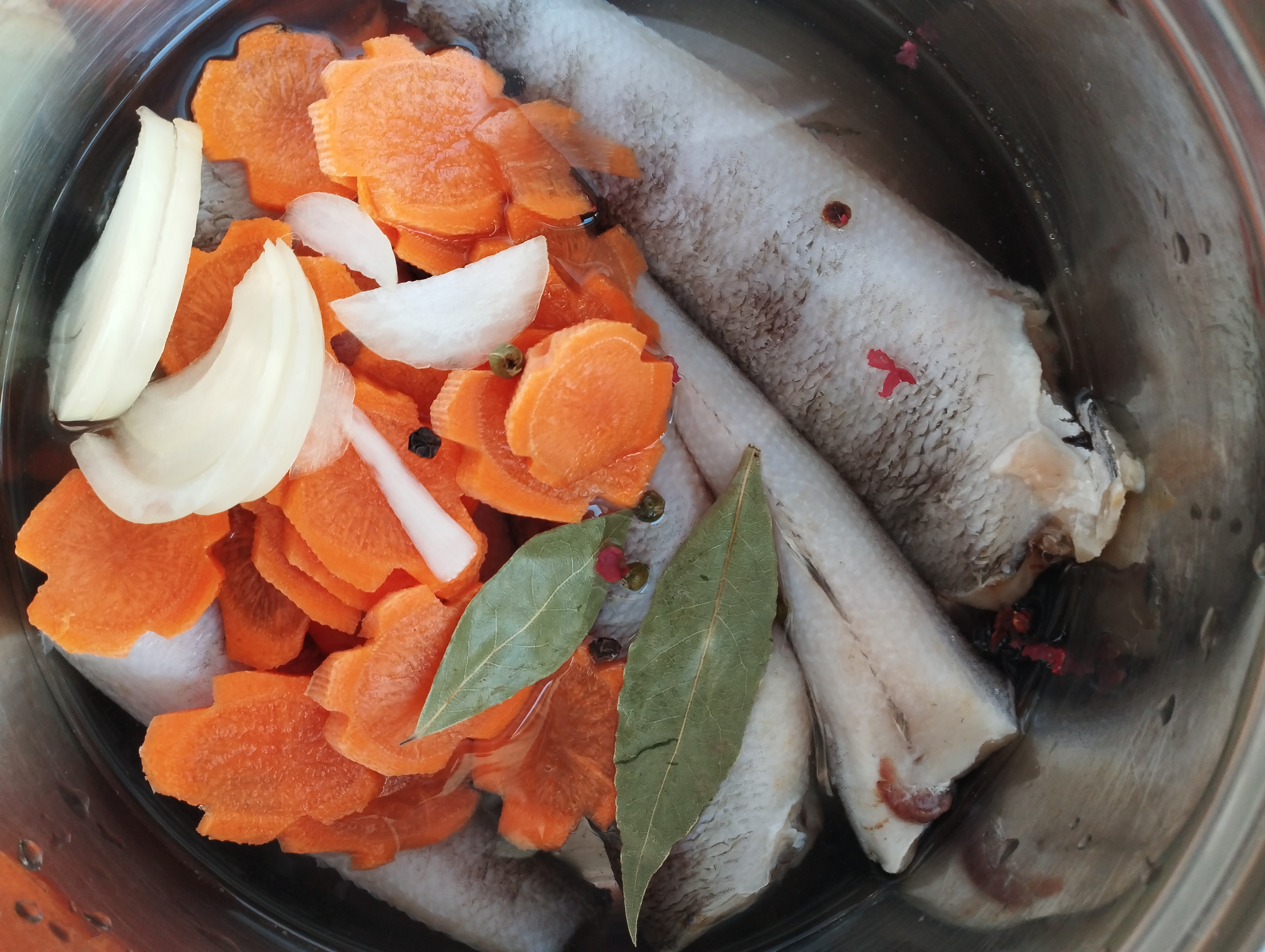

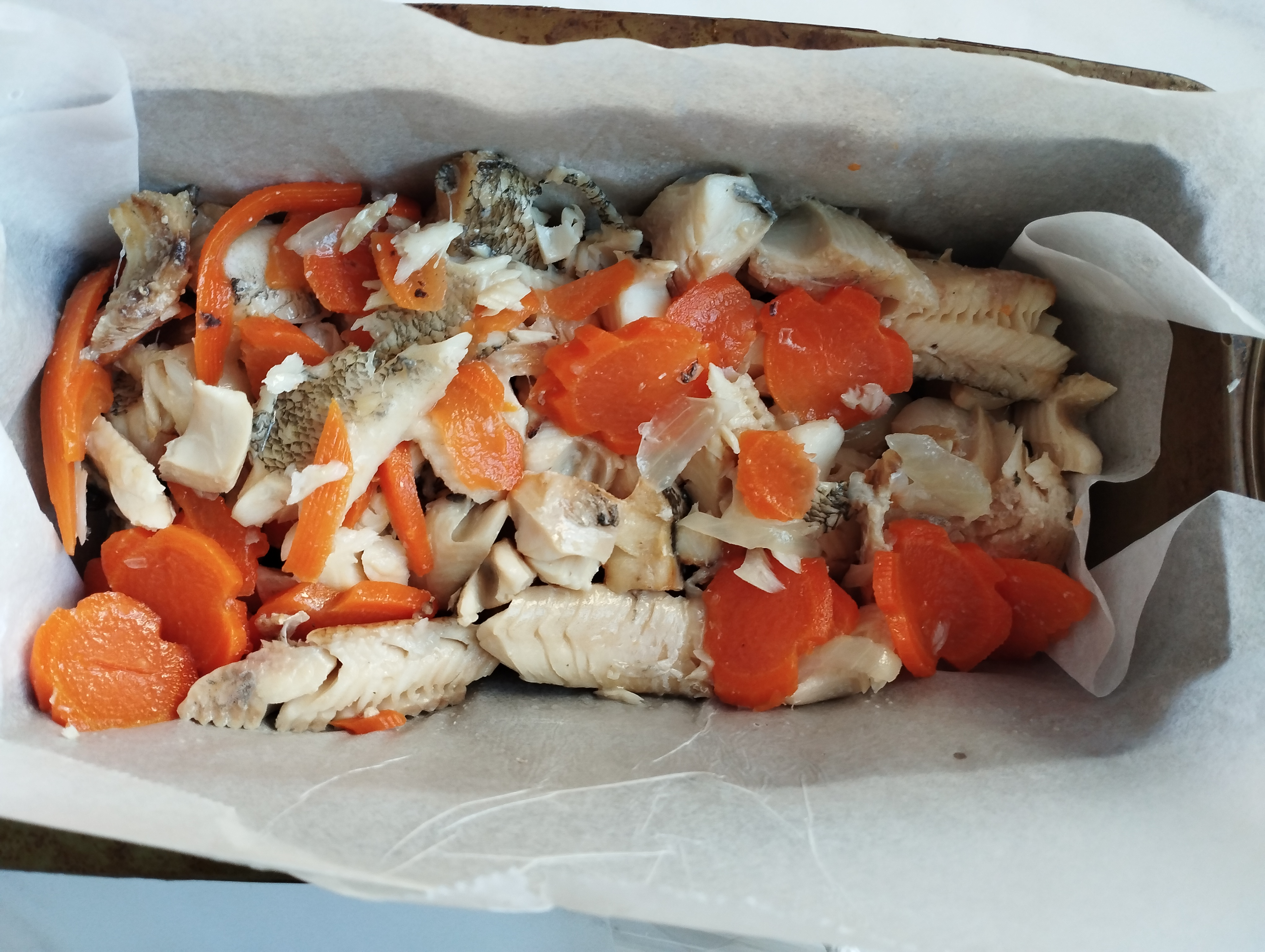

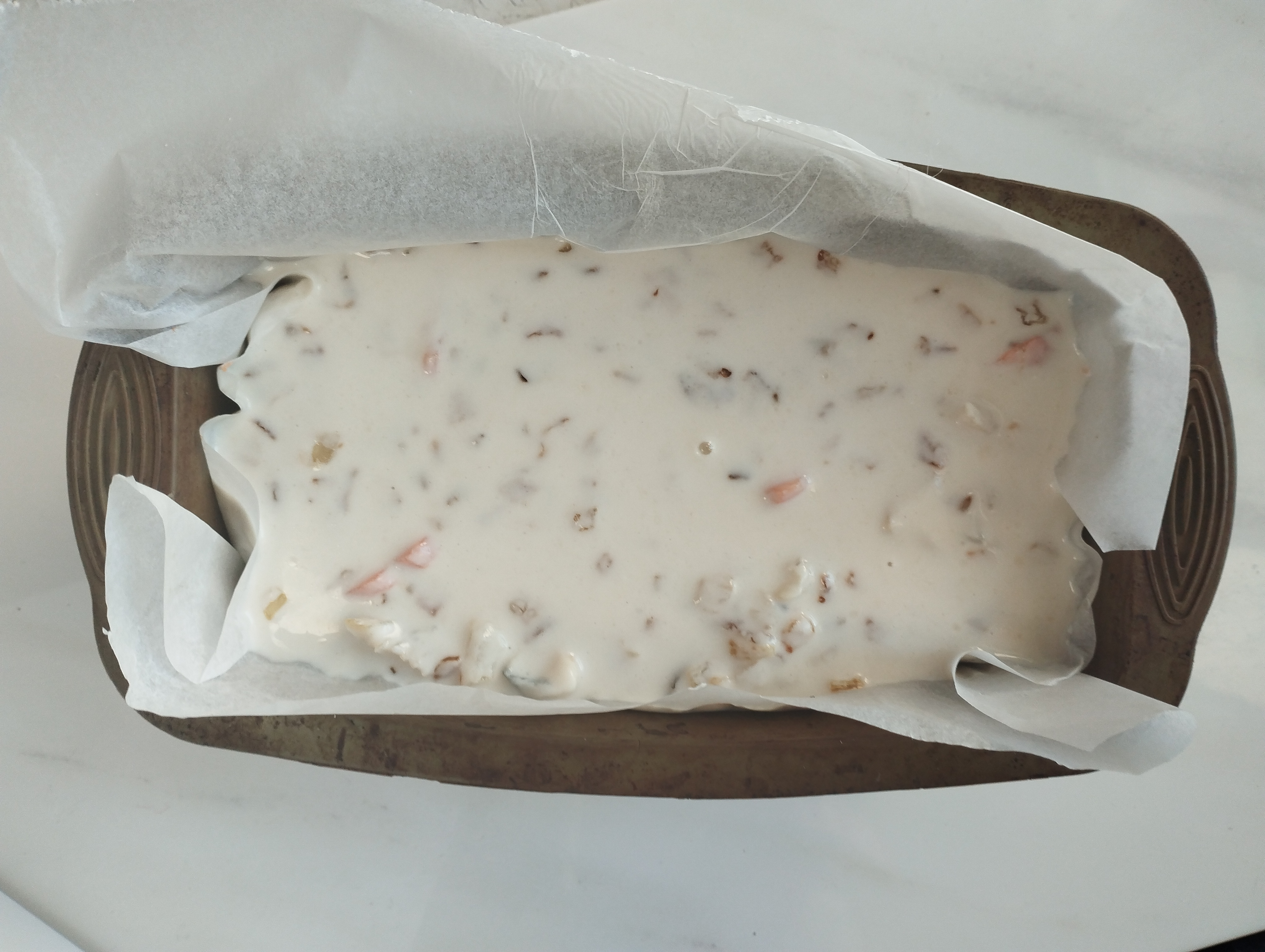

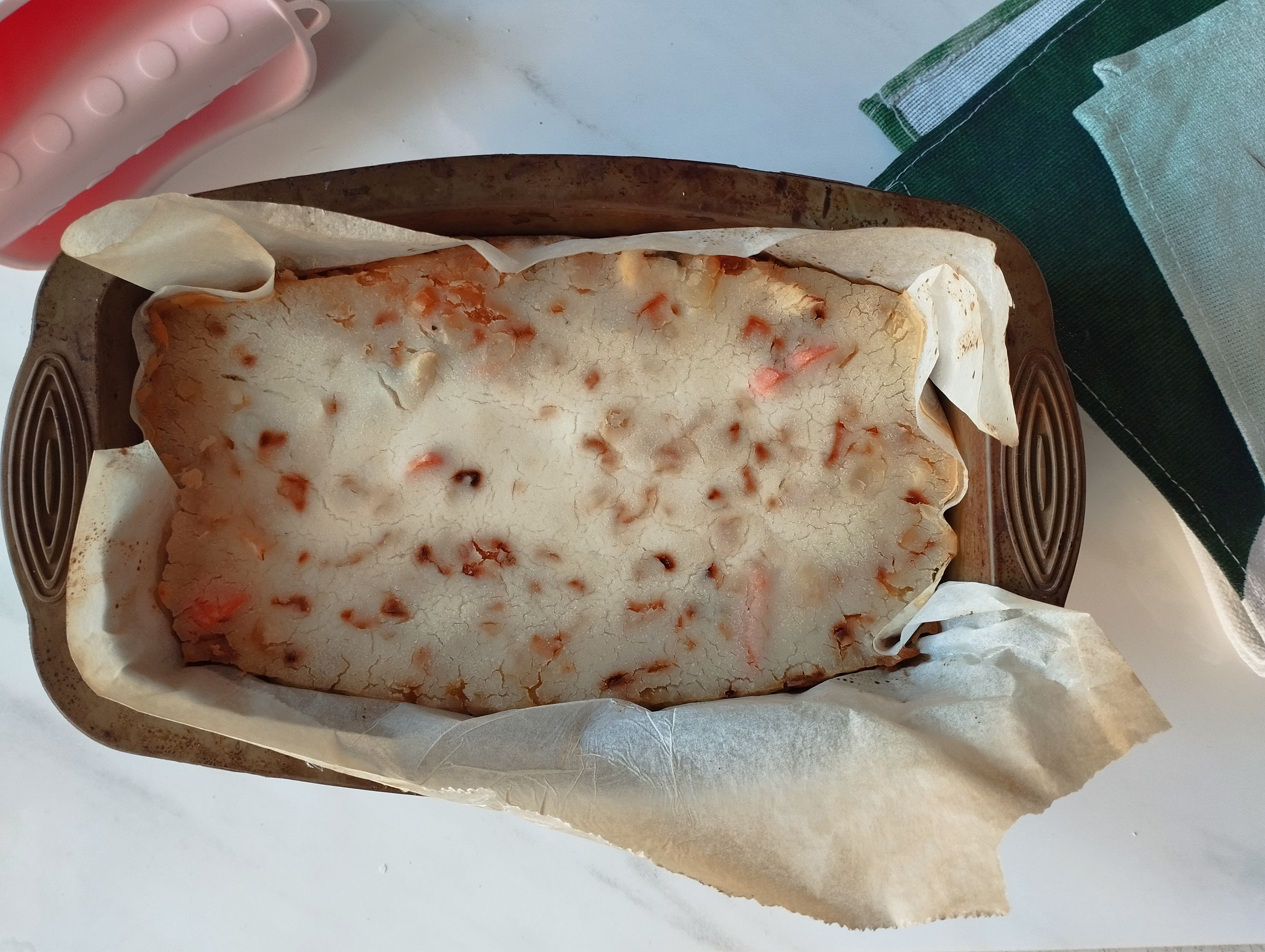

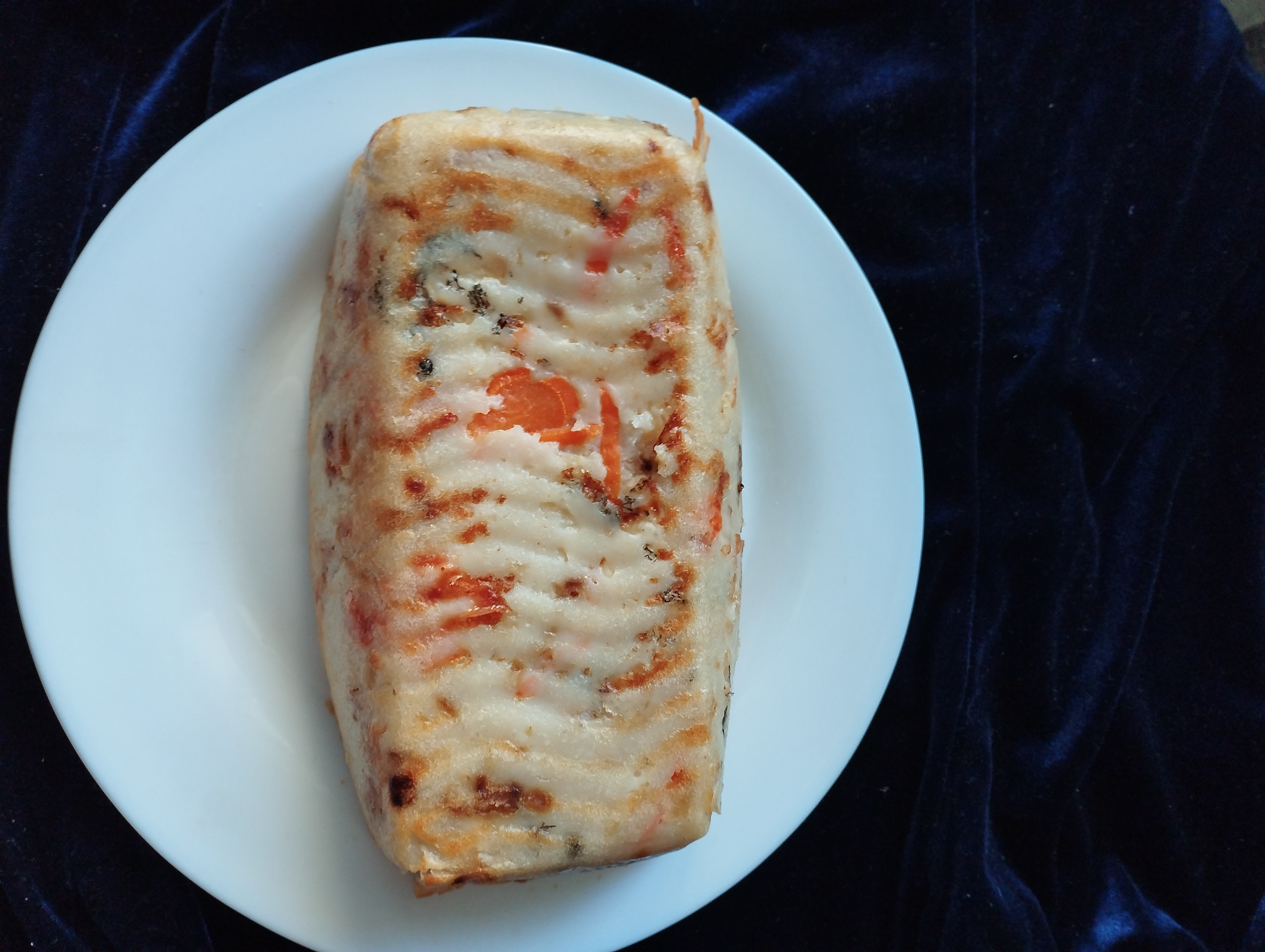

== Sources ==
- Артюх Л. Ф. Коментарі до тексту: Шарпанина; Баба-шарпанина // Страви й напитки на Україні / Клиновецька З.; Вид. репринт. З видання: Київ-Львів, 1913. — Київ: Час, 1991. — С. 32.
- Баба-шарпанина // Обычаи, поверья, кухня и напитки малороссиян. / Маркевич Н.— К., 1860. — С. 151.
