= Latke =

Jewish potato pancake dish

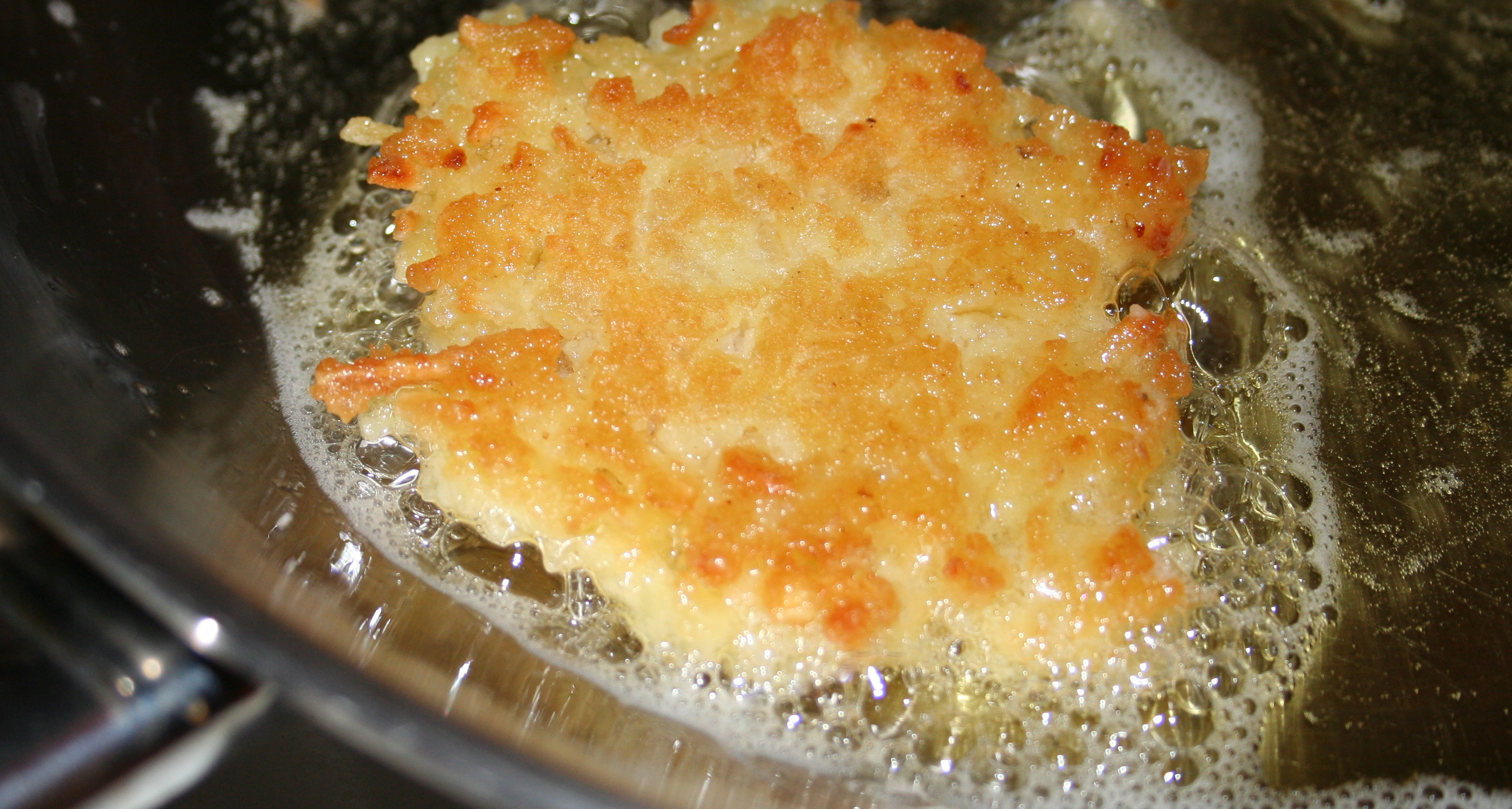
- A latke frying
- Alternative names: Levivot, latka, potato pancake
- Type: Fritter
- Region or state: Central and Eastern Europe
- Serving temperature: Hot, traditionally with sour cream or applesauce
- Main ingredients: Potatoes, onion, egg, matzo meal, kosher salt, cooking oil

A latke (Yiddish: לאַטקע, romanized: latke, lit. 'pancake'; sometimes romanized latka) is a type of potato pancake or fritter in Ashkenazi Jewish cuisine that is traditionally prepared to celebrate Hanukkah.

It is commonly eaten by the Jewish diaspora and has many variations. The most basic form is composed of shredded potatoes and egg yolk, fried in oil.

== Etymology ==
The word comes from the Yiddish latke, itself from the East Slavic oladka, a diminutive of oladya 'small fried pancake', which in turn is from Hellenistic Greek ἐλάδιον eládion, '(olive) oil', diminutive of Ancient Greek ἔλαιον élaion, 'oil'.

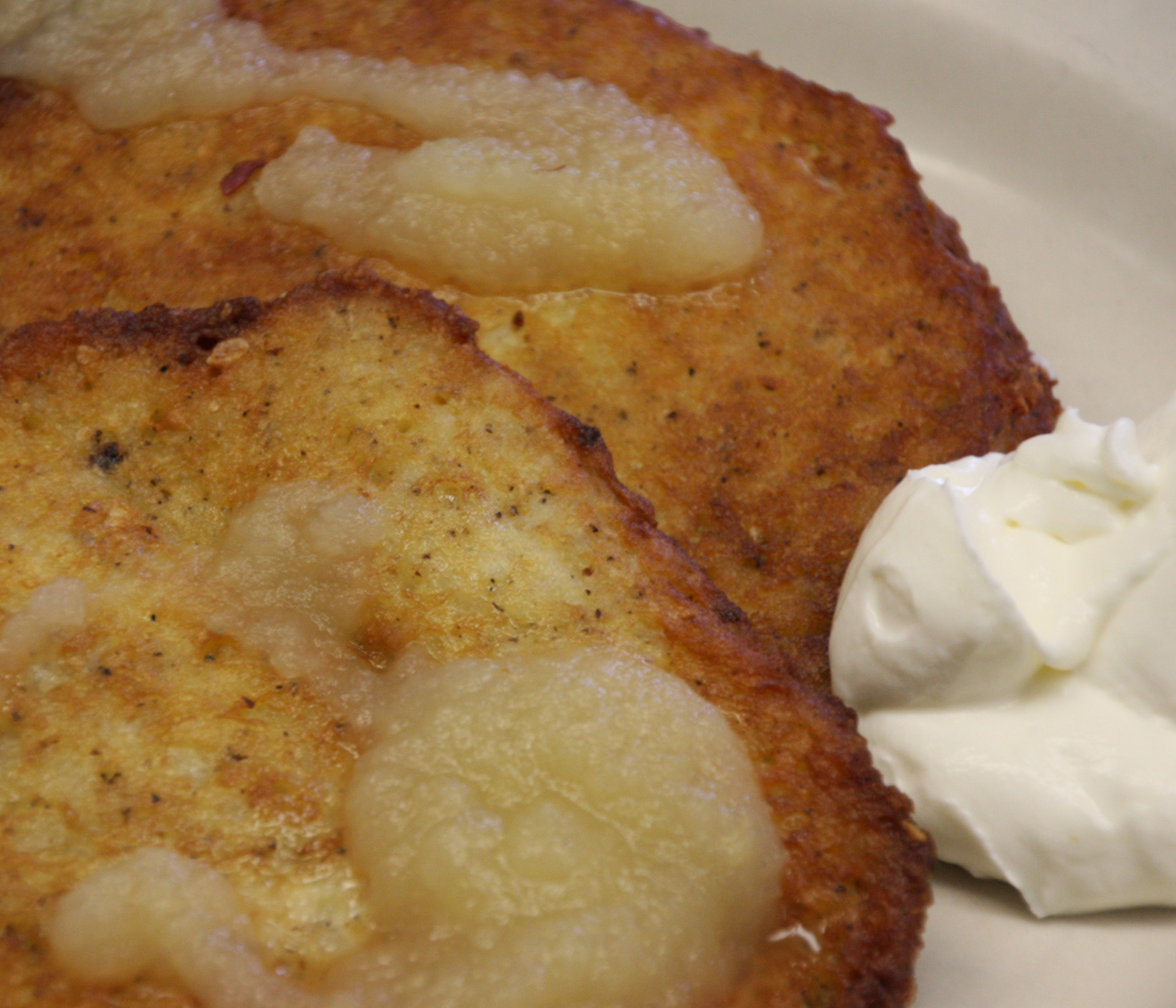
Latkes served with applesauce and sour cream

Its Modern Hebrew name, levivah (לְבִיבָה levivá), plural levivot, is a revival of a word used in the Book of Samuel to describe a dumpling made from kneaded dough, part of the story of Amnon and Tamar.

== History ==
Although the fritter was not made in the Land of Israel during biblical times, the story behind the levivot is usually regarded as biblical, and appears in the story of Amnon and Tamar. Amnon, who lusted after his half-sister Tamar, pretended to be ill and asked their father David: "Let Tamar my sister come and prepare two levivot before my eyes, so I may eat from her hand" (2 Samuel 13:6). And it is written about Tamar: "She took the dough, kneaded it, and prepared the levivot before his eyes, and cooked them. Then she took the pan and served them to him..." (verses 8–9).

Some version of latkes goes back to at least the Middle Ages. They were likely made of cheese (probably either ricotta or curd cheese), fried in poppyseed oil or butter, and served with fruit preserves. These cheese latkes were the most common kind of latke in Ashkenazi communities until the 19th century when the potato arrived in Eastern Europe. At the time, the cheapest and most readily available cooking fat was schmaltz, rendered poultry fat (usually from a goose or chicken), and due to Jewish dietary laws, which prohibit the mixing of meat and dairy products, alternatives to the cheese latke were introduced. These included buckwheat, rye flour, or root vegetables endemic to the region, such as turnips. As the potato became popular in Eastern Europe (particularly in Poland and Ukraine) along with crop shortages, it was quickly adopted to the point that today, latke is almost synonymous with potatoes.

The latke carries religious symbolism within Judaism, and is traditionally prepared during the Hanukkah holiday to commemorate the miracle of the oil in the Jewish Temple in Jerusalem lasting eight days.

== Variations ==
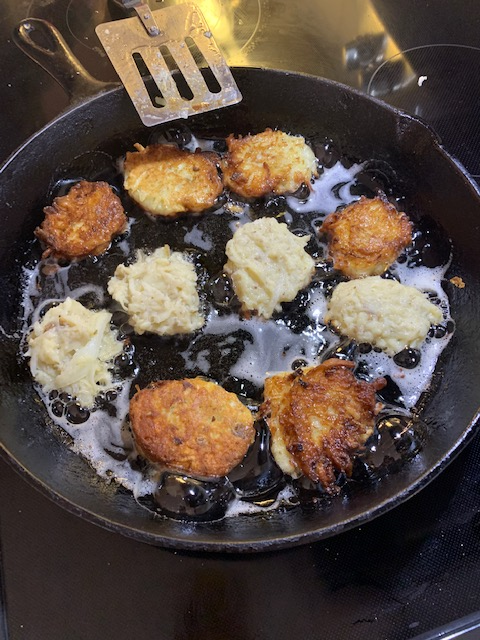
Potato latkes frying in a skillet

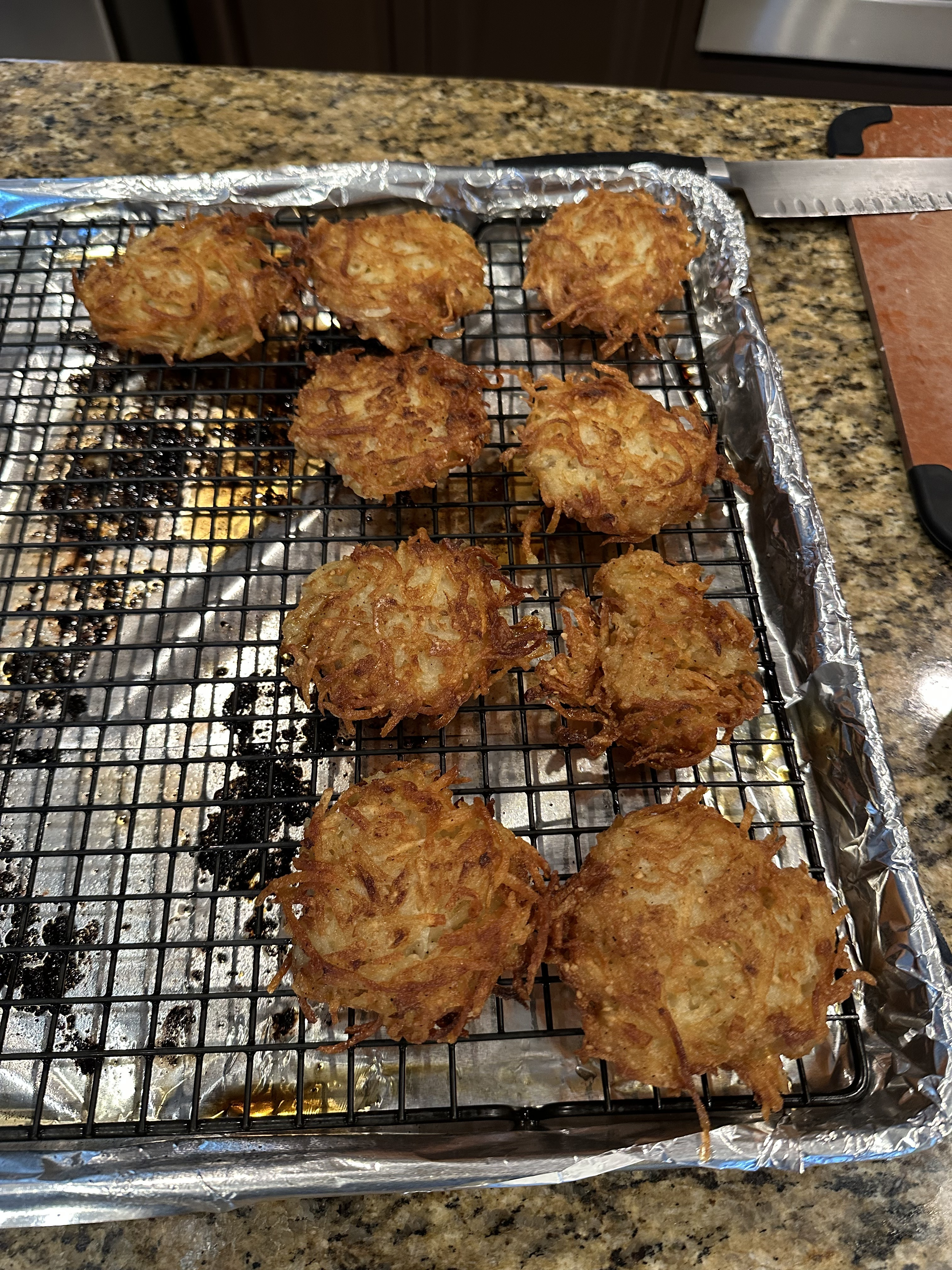
Tray of cooked latkes

Latkes today are most commonly made with potatoes, although other vegetables are also sometimes used. There are two main varieties: those made with grated potato and those made with puréed or mashed potato. The textures of these two varieties are different.

=== Grated potato version ===
Latkes made of grated potatoes are popular. They are prepared by grating potatoes and onions with a box grater or food processor; then, excess moisture is squeezed out. The grated potatoes are then mixed with eggs and flour or matzo meal. A vegan version uses chickpea flour and potato starch instead of eggs. The latkes are fried in batches in an oiled pan. The thickness is a matter of personal preference.

=== Puréed potato version ===
The dough for puréed potato latkes is puréed in a food processor. This form of latke is easier to shape and has a "pudding-like consistency".

=== Other variations ===
Before the potato, latkes were and in some places still are, made from a variety of other vegetables, cheeses, legumes, or starches. Modern recipes often call for the addition of onions and carrots. Other versions include zucchini, sweet onion, gruyere (for french onion flavor), and sweet potatoes. Sephardi Jews make latkes with zucchini and garlic (mücver), omitting dairy-based toppings (yogurt) when served as a side for roasts or meat. Latkes are often served with either sour cream or applesauce.

== See also ==
- Ijjeh – Arab dish of eggs in a pancake (sometimes cooked like latkes)
- Fritas de prasa – Sephardic Jewish leek fritters
- Hush puppy – Deep-fried savory food made from cornmeal batter
- Latke–Hamantash Debate – Annual debate at the University of Chicago
