= Varenye =

Type of whole-fruit preserve

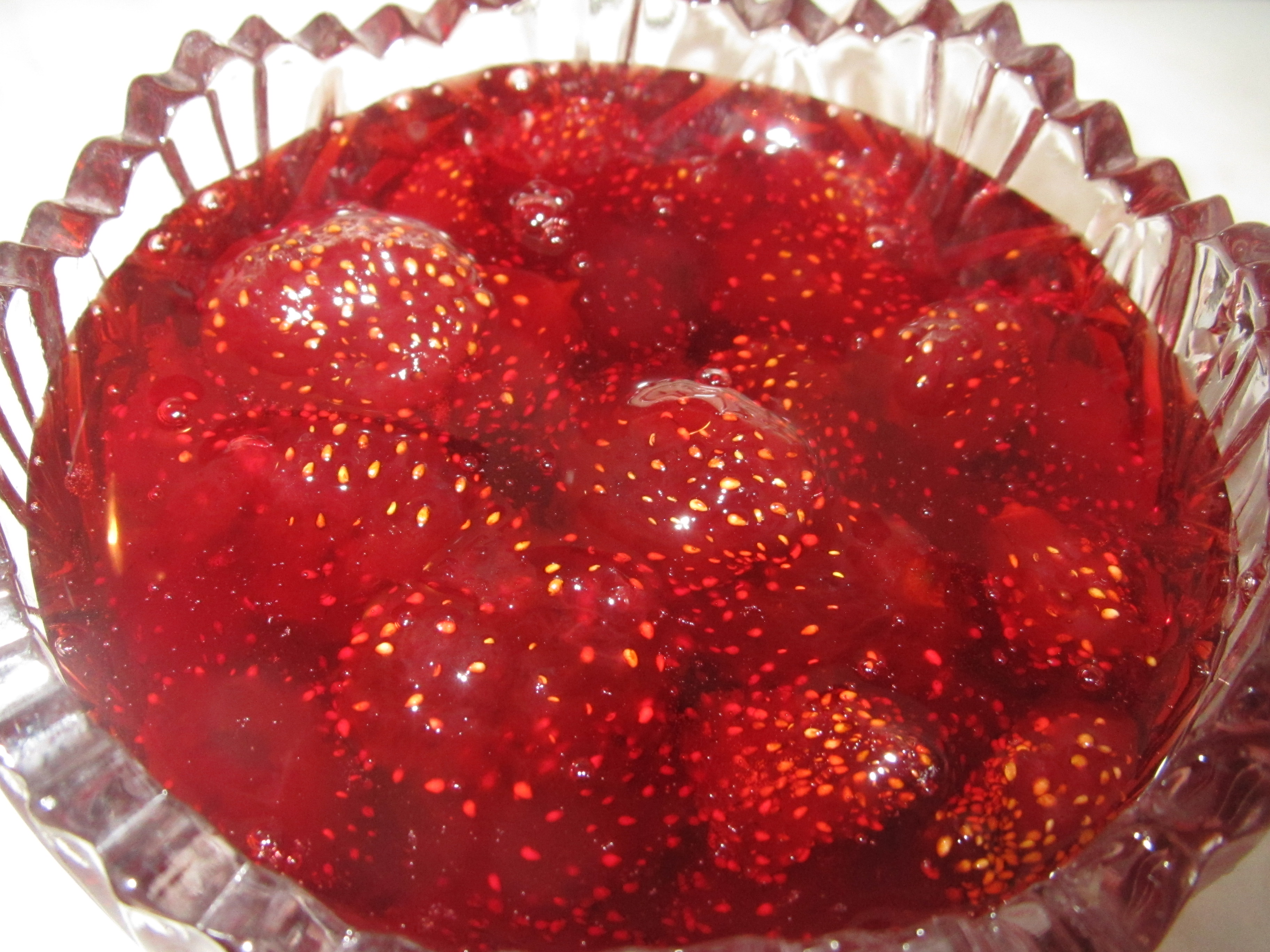
- Strawberry varenye
- Course: Dessert
- Region or state: Eastern Europe, Baltic region
- Main ingredients: berries or other fruits, sugar

Varenye (Note: Russian: варенье, pronounced [vɐˈrʲenʲjɪ]; Belarusian: варэнне/варэньне, romanized: varennie/vareńnie, or сочыва, sočyva (rare); Ukrainian: варення, romanized: varennia, pronounced [wɐˈrɛnʲːɐ]; Lithuanian: uogienė, pronounced [uə̯ˈɡʲǐə̯nʲeː]; Latvian: ievārījums; Estonian: moos) is a popular whole-fruit preserve, widespread in Eastern Europe (Russia, Ukraine, Belarus), as well as the Baltic region. It is made by cooking berries, other fruits, or more rarely nuts, vegetables, or flowers, in sugar syrup. In some traditional recipes, other sweeteners, such as honey or treacle, are used instead of or in addition to sugar.

Varenye is similar to jam except the fruits are not macerated, and no gelling agent is added. It is characterized by a thick but transparent syrup having the natural colour of the fruits.

== Etymology, translations, and cultural references ==
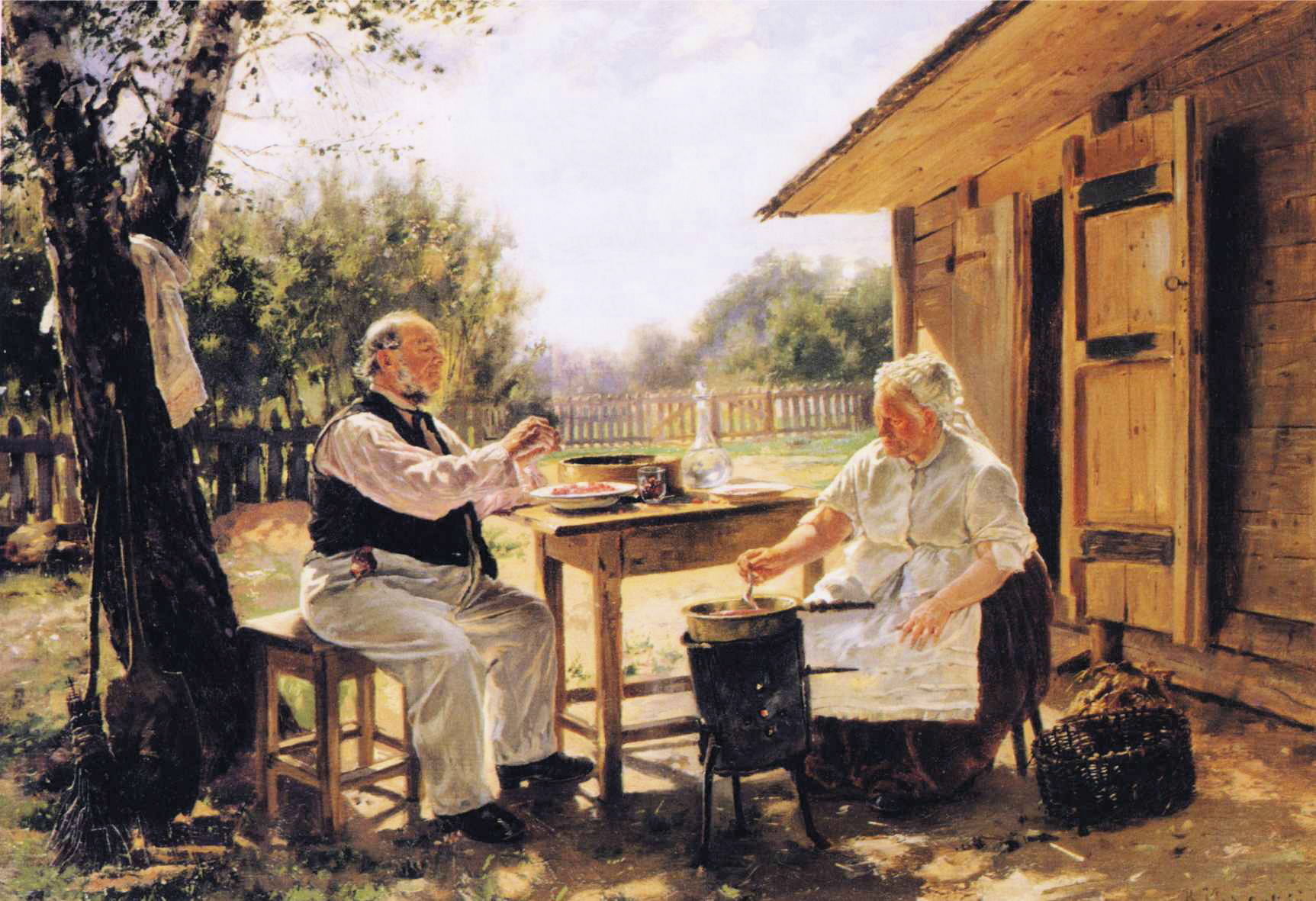
Vladimir Makovsky, Making Varenye, 1876

Varenye is an old Slavic word which is used in East Slavic languages in a more general sense to refer to any type of sweet fruit preserve. The word has common etymological roots with the verbs denoting cooking, boiling, brewing, or stewing (Russian: варить, Belarusian: варыць, Ukrainian: варити).

In literary translations, especially of children's books, into Russian, the term is often used to replace less-common loanwords, such as jam, confiture or marmalade. Examples are the translations of Alice's Adventures in Wonderland, Harry Potter, The Adventures of Tom Sawyer, and the animated movies about Karlsson-on-the-Roof.

The same is true when translating from Russian. For instance, the making of raspberry varenye is described in Leo Tolstoy's novel Anna Karenina (VI-2). In her classic translation, Constance Garnett refers to the activity as "jam-making".

In the popular Soviet children's book A Tale About a War Secret, About the Boy Nipper-Pipper, and His Word of Honour by Arkady Gaidar the antihero Little Baddun betrays his friends for "a barrel of varenye and a basket of biscuits" (Russian: бочка варенья и корзина печенья; again, in English translation jam is used instead of varenye). This phrase became an idiomatic expression for betrayal or selling out in Russian, similar to thirty pieces of silver.

== Preparation ==
The making of varenye requires a careful balance between cooking, or sometimes steeping in the hot sugar mixture for just enough time to allow the flavor to be extracted from the fruit, and sugar to penetrate the fruit, and cooking too long that fruit will break down and liquefy. Some fruits with tough skins require cooking for many hours, while others are suitable for making "five-minute varenye" (Russian: варенье-пятиминутка, varenye-pyatiminutka). For the latter, dry sugar is spread over raw fruit in layers and left for several hours to steep into the fruit. The resulting mixture is then heated for just about five minutes.

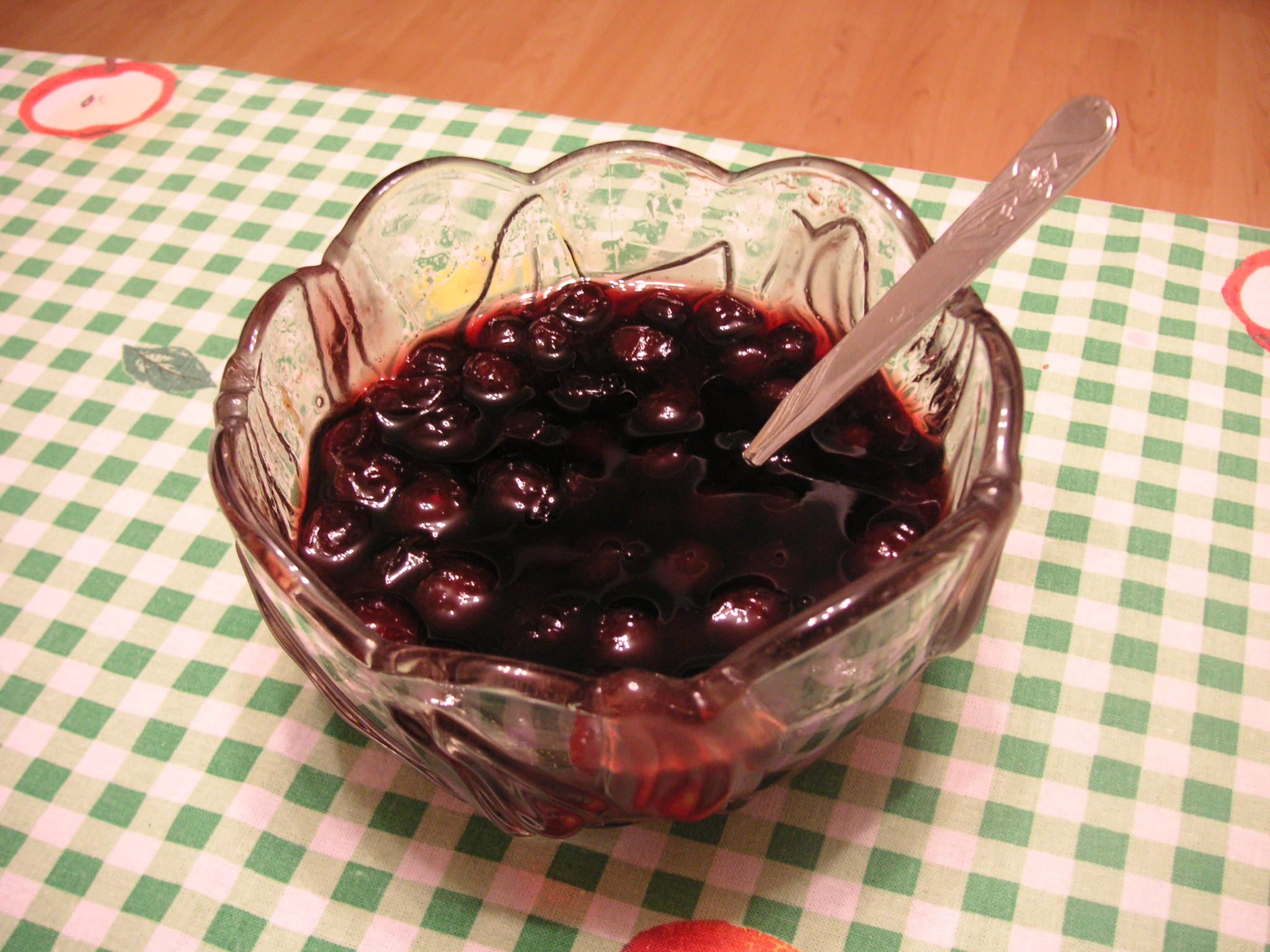
Sour cherry varenye

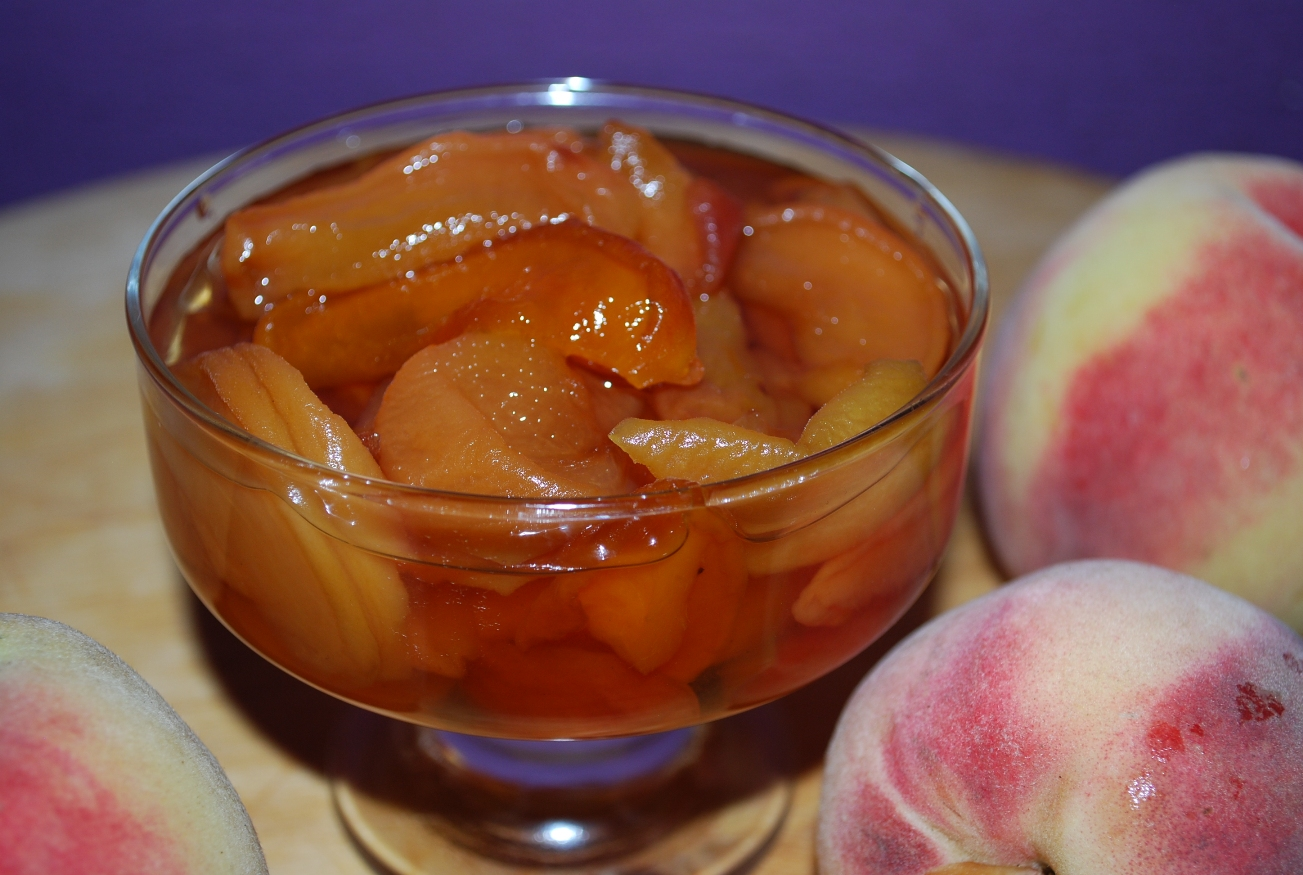
Peach varenye

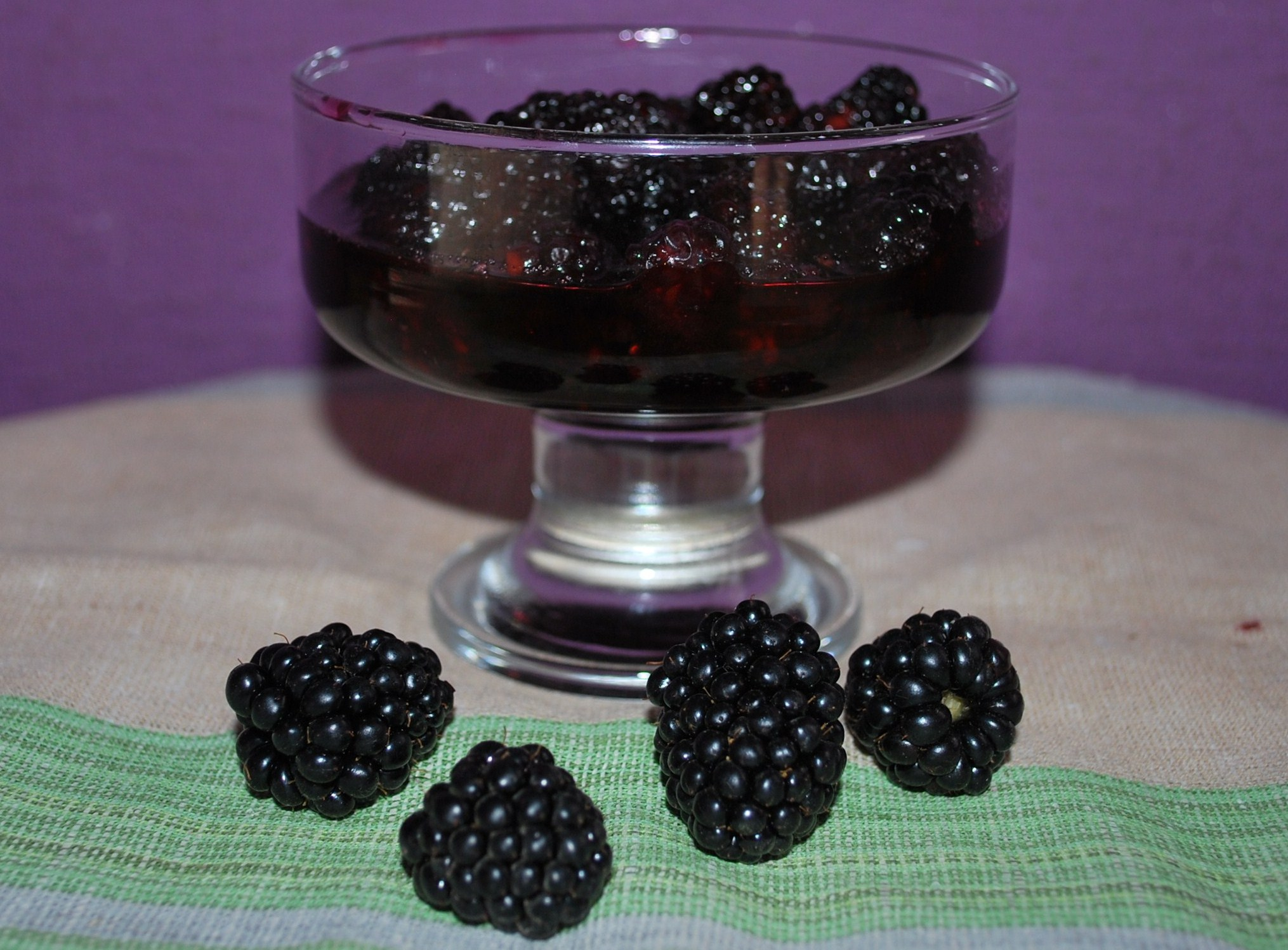
Blackberry varenye

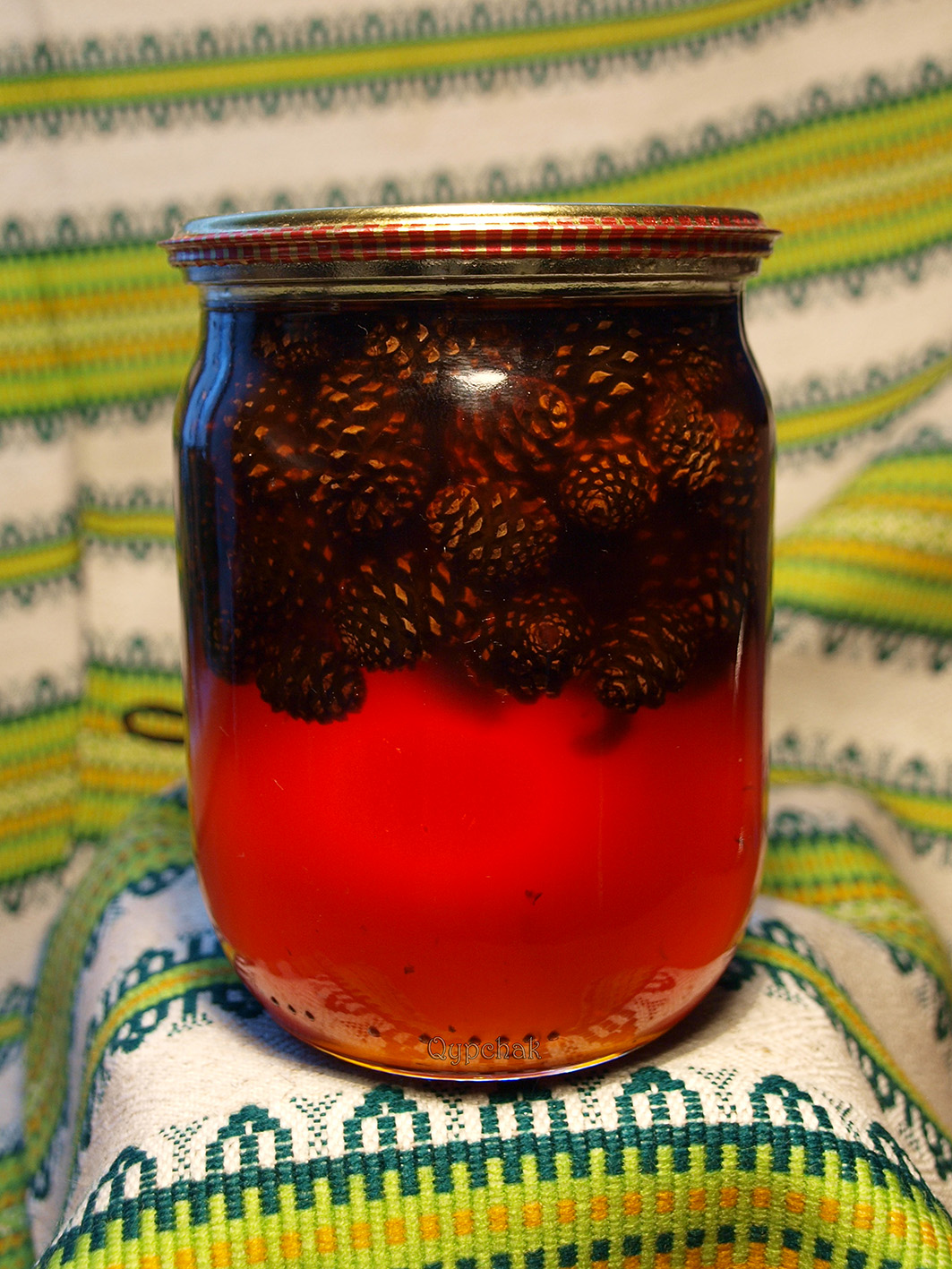
Pine cone varenye

== Usage ==
Varenye is enjoyed as a dessert and condiment, in particular as a topping for pancakes (bliny, oladyi, syrniki), as a filling for pies (pirogi and pirozhki), dumplings (vareniki), cakes and cookies, and as a sweetener for tea. It is also used as a spread on bread, though due to its liquid consistency it is not well suited for that. Finally, it is eaten on its own as a sweet.

== Related specialties ==
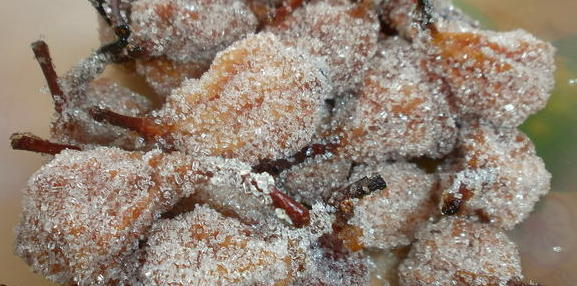
Dry pear varenye Kyiv-style

The more general usage of the term varenye in Eastern Europe includes a number of related local specialties.

=== Raw varenye ===
In the preparation of "raw varenye" (Russian: сырое варенье, syroye varenye) the heating is omitted completely. The recipes usually include grating of raw berries or other fruits and mixing them with sugar.

=== Dry varenye ===
In pre-revolutionary Russia, "dry varenye" (Russian: сухое варенье, sukhoye varenye; Ukrainian: сухе варення, sukhe varennia) referred to a local variety of candied fruits (fruit confit) obtained by extracting fruits from varenye syrup and drying them. Kyiv (today the capital of Ukraine) was particularly famous for this delicacy, and it regained its popularity in the city in 2016.

== Similar dishes ==
Similar sweets are also made in Transcaucasia and in some regions of Central and South Asia, where they are called murabba. In Bulgarian, Macedonian, and Serbian cuisines, these kinds of confections are called slatko, and in Greece and Cyprus, they are known as spoon sweets. In French cuisine, they are referred to as confitures or fruits confits.
