= Cheese latke =

Ashkenazi dish

- Alternative names: Kases Kikelech (Yiddish)
- Type: Pancake
- Course: Breakfast, dessert
- Place of origin: Israel
- Region or state: Ashkenazi Jewish cuisine
- Created by: Ancient Israelites
- Serving temperature: Warm
- Main ingredients: Cheese, eggs, flour
- Variations: Ricotta cheese, added spices

Cheese latkes (Yiddish: קאַזעס קיכעלעך, romanized: kases kichelech, literally "cheese cookies") are a traditional Jewish dish with ancient roots, especially significant in Ashkenazi cuisine. It is a type of latke pancake made from cheese and is often enjoyed during Hanukkah and other festive occasions. Cheese latkes are distinct from the more commonly known potato latkes, which also play a significant role in Jewish culinary traditions.

== History ==
The origins of cheese latkes can be traced back to ancient Israel, where dairy products were a staple in the diet of the Israelites. Historical texts and archaeological findings suggest that cheese was a significant part of the diet in ancient Israel, often made from goat's or sheep's milk. The tradition of making dairy-based dishes, such as cheese pancakes, has been carried through centuries, evolving with time and diaspora influences.

In ancient times, dairy foods were associated with the holiday of Shavuot, which celebrates the giving of the Torah at Mount Sinai. The consumption of dairy during this period is thought to be linked to the Israelites' temporary inability to adhere to kosher meat preparation laws immediately after receiving the Torah. Thus, dairy dishes, including early forms of cheese latkes, became customary.

== Ingredients ==
The basic ingredients for cheese latkes typically include:

- Farmer cheese or cottage cheese
- Eggs
- Flour or matzo meal
- Sugar
- Salt
- Vanilla extract (optional)

Additional ingredients such as lemon zest or raisins can be added for extra flavor.

== Preparation ==
To prepare cheese latkes, the cheese is mixed with eggs, flour (or matzo meal), sugar, and salt to form a batter. Small portions of the batter are then spooned into a hot, oiled skillet and fried until golden brown on both sides. They can be served warm, often topped with sour cream, applesauce, or a sprinkle of powdered sugar.

== Variations ==
There are several variations of cheese latkes, influenced by regional preferences and family traditions. Some recipes use ricotta cheese for a lighter texture, while others might incorporate spices like cinnamon or nutmeg. In some households, cheese latkes are sweetened more heavily and served as a dessert.

== Cultural significance ==
Cheese latkes hold a special place in Jewish culinary tradition, especially during Hanukkah. They embody the themes of the holiday, celebrating the miracle of the oil and the resilience of the Jewish people. The tradition of eating cheese latkes during Hanukkah may also be linked to the story of Judith, who is said to have fed cheese to the Assyrian general Holofernes, making him thirsty for wine, which led to his downfall and the Jewish victory.

== See also ==
- Syrniki
