= Syrniki =

Fried quark pancakes from Eastern European cuisine

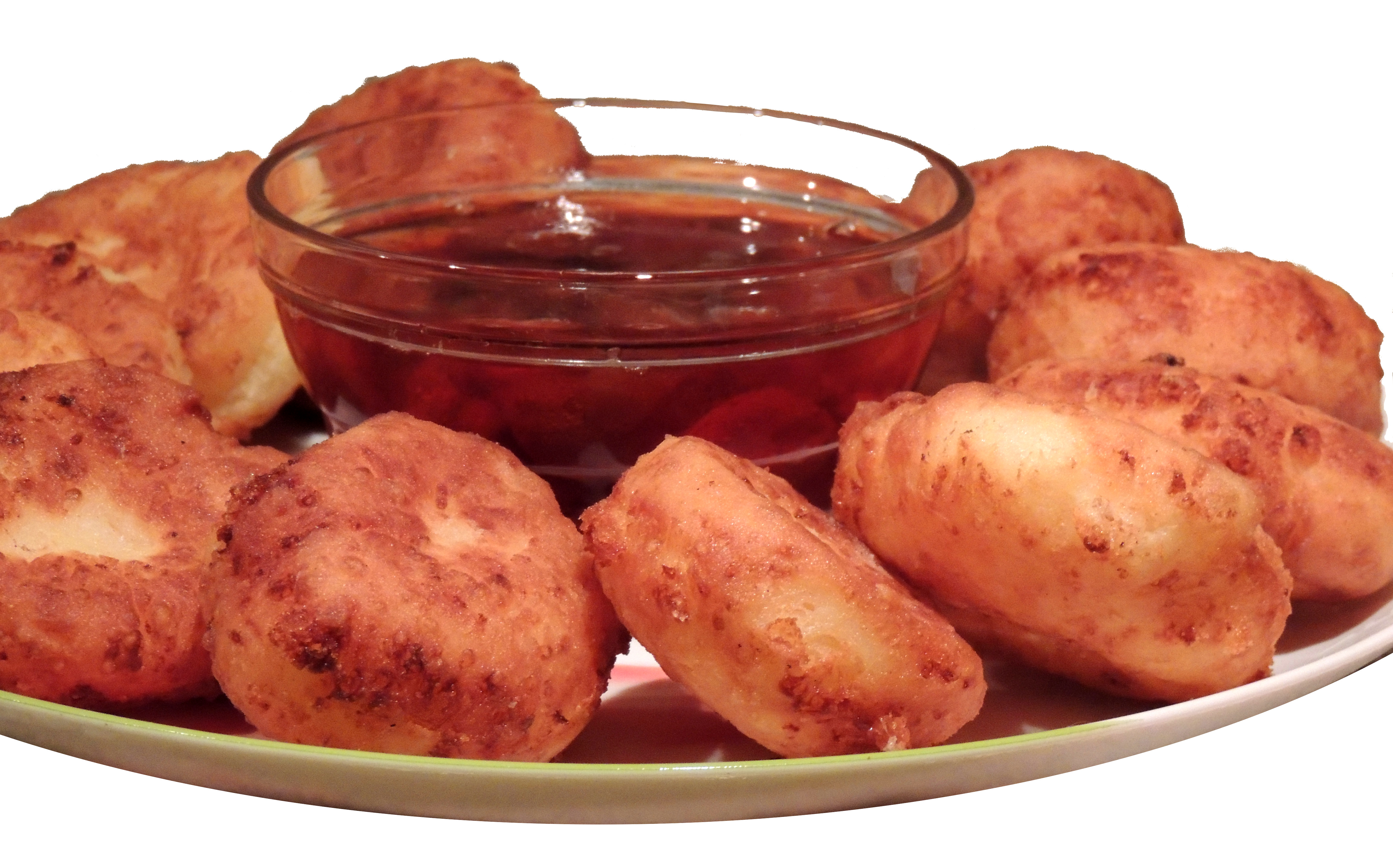
- Syrniki served with strawberry varenye
- Alternative names: Syrnyky, tvorozhniki
- Type: Pancake
- Associated cuisine: Belarusian, Polish, Russian, Serbian, Ukrainian
- Main ingredients: Tvorog/quark (curd cheese)/cottage cheese, flour, eggs, sugar; sometimes raisins, vanilla extract

Syrniki (Belarusian: сырнікі; Russian: сырники; Ukrainian: сирники) are fried Eastern Slavic quark (curd cheese) pancakes. They are a part of Belarusian, Russian, Ukrainian, Latvian (biezpiena plācenīši) and Lithuanian (varškėčiai) cuisines. In Russia, they are also known as tvorozhniki (творо́жники).

== Etymology ==
The name syrniki is derived from the Slavic root syr (сир, сыр), meaning a soft curd cheese. The Ukrainian language retains the old Slavic sense of the word, as in domashnii syr (домашній сир, literal translation 'domestic cheese'), whereas in Russian another old Slavic word for curd cheese, tvorog (творог), is used.

== Preparation ==
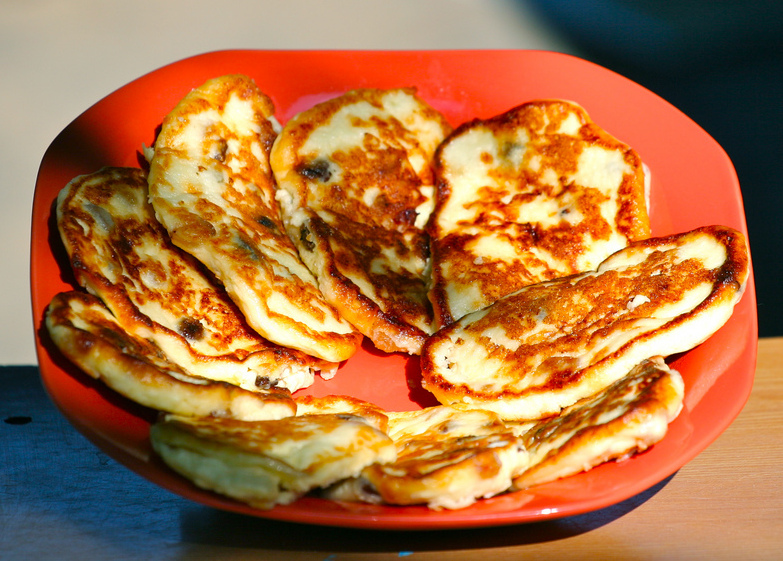
Syrniki with raisins

Syrnyky or tvorozhniki are made from creamy tvorog, mixed with flour, eggs and sugar, sometimes adding vanilla extract. Pot cheese or farmer's cheese or quark is suggested as a substitute for the tvorog. The soft mixture is shaped into cakes, which are pan- or shallow-fried in vegetable oil or in hot butter. The consistency should remain slightly creamy, while they are slightly browned on both sides. They are traditionally sweet and served for breakfast or dessert, but can be made savory as well. Raisins, chopped dried apricot, fresh apples or pears are sometimes added into the batter. They are typically served with varenye, jam, smetana (sour cream) or melted butter.

== Outside Eastern Europe ==
Their equivalent in Germany, especially East Germany, is Quarkkäulchen. Syrniki have gained popularity in Israel in recent years, brought by immigrants from Ukraine, Russia, and Belarus.

== See also ==
- Cheese latke
- Oladyi
- Lazy pierogi
