= Confiture =

Fruit jam in thick syrup

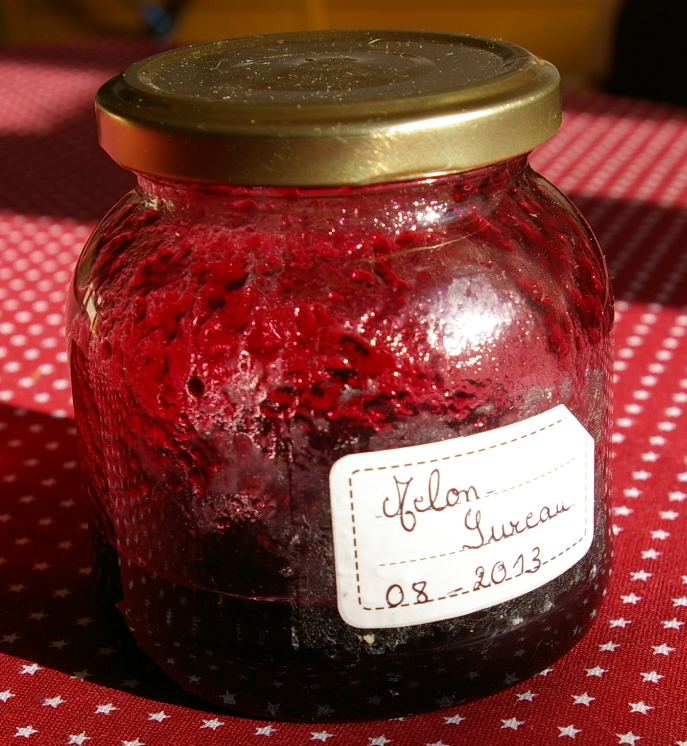
- Elderberry confiture (jam)
- Type: Jam, marmalade, paste, sweetmeat, or fruit stewed in thick syrup
- Main ingredients: Fruit

A confiture is any fruit jam, marmalade, paste, sweetmeat, or fruit stewed in thick syrup. Confit, the root of the word, comes from the French word confire, which literally means 'preserved'; a confit being any type of food that is cooked slowly over a long period of time as a method of preservation.

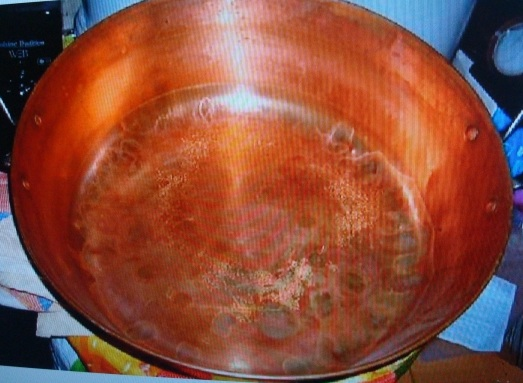
A copper bowl for cooking confiture

== See also ==
- Fruit preserves – fruits combined with sugar readied in a manner appropriate for long-term storage
- Konfyt – South African jam
- Spoon sweets – Fruits candied in a syrupy glaze, offered in Greece as a gesture of hospitality
- Varenye – Russian preserves made with whole fruits or large fruit pieces
- Slatko – a whole-fruit preserve in Eastern European cuisine
- List of spreads
