= Blini =

Russian pancake

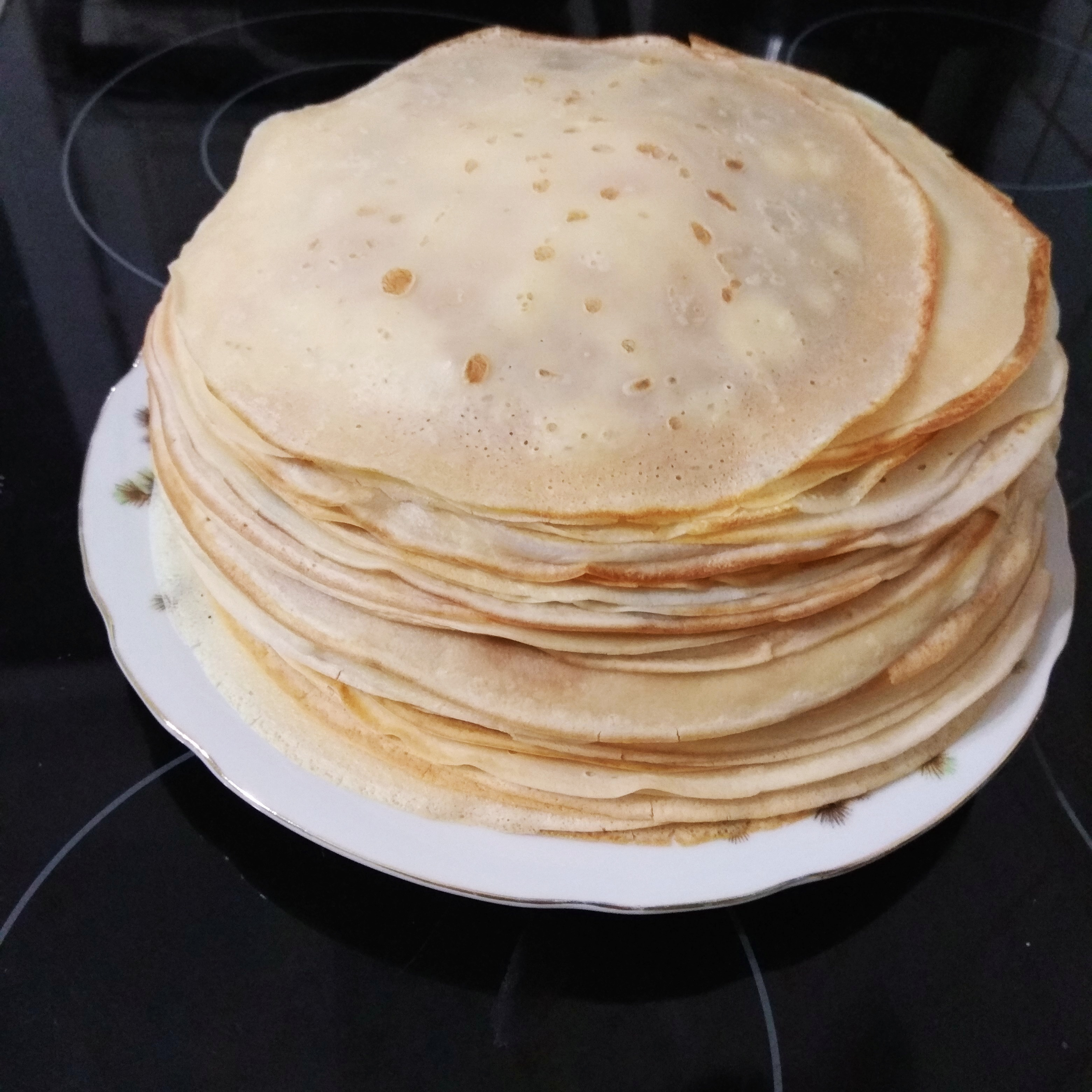
- Blini
- Alternative names: blin, bliny
- Type: pancake
- Place of origin: Russia
- Main ingredients: wheat, eggs (optional), milk, water

Blini (also blinis or bliny; Russian: блины; sing. blin; Russian: блин) are Russian pancakes, often made with a yeast-raised batter of buckwheat, or wheat flour and milk. (Note: Attributed to the following references:) They may be served with smetana, cottage cheese, caviar and other garnishes, or simply smeared with butter. They are a traditional dish in Russian cuisine.

In the English language, blini traditionally refers to small savory pancakes made with leavened batter. In modern Russian, the term most often refers to pan-sized leavened thin pancakes, although smaller leavened pancakes are also called blini. Smaller and thicker pancakes (with several of them baked on one larger pan) are called oladyi.

Blintzes, called blinchiki ('little blinis') in Russian, are an offshoot of blini or crêpes. They are basically rolls based on thin pancakes usually made of wheat flour, folded to form a casing for various kinds of filling, typically cheese, fruit, or (in Russian cuisine) pre-fried minced meat, and then sautéed or baked.

== Etymology ==
The Proto-Slavic term for the Russian pancakes was probably mlinŭ ('to mill'), which was transformed in Old Russian into млинъ, mlinŭ, and блинъ, blinŭ (cf. млинець, mlynets, Ukrainian for blin). Max Vasmer, in his Etymological Dictionary of the Russian Language, notes that a similar word is used in many Slavic languages, as well as in Latvian and Lithuanian. While the modern Russian word блины, bliny (plural of блин, blin), also refers to foreign-introduced pancakes in general, the term русские блины, russkiye bliny ('Russian pancakes'), is often emphasized in Russia for differentiation.

Some English dictionaries record usage of the forms blin as singular and blini or bliny as plural, which corresponds to the original Russian forms, but other dictionaries consider this usage so rare in English that they do not mention blin at all and only record the widespread modern regular usage of blini for the singular and blinis for the plural.

== History ==
Blini have a history dating to the Middle Ages. In Russian culture, blini were traditionally prepared at the end of winter during Maslenitsa ('butter week') as a treat eaten twice a day. There were also other occasions for eating blini, such as at funerals and during prayers for the dead.

Traditional Russian blini are made with yeasted batter, which is left to rise and then diluted with milk, soured milk, and cold or boiling water. When diluted with boiling water, they are referred to as zavarnye bliny (the Russian term zavarnoe testo corresponds to "choux pastry"). A lighter and thinner form made from unyeasted batter (usually made of flour, eggs, milk, or soured milk, kefir, ryazhenka, varenets) is also common in Russia. All kinds of flour may be used, from wheat and buckwheat to oatmeal and millet, although wheat is currently the most popular. Historically, blini have been baked in a Russian oven, which was used for heat processing of all kinds of food. Even though blini are nowadays pan-fried, like pancakes, preparing blini is still referred to as "pech bliny" (i.e., "to bake blini") in Russian, and the word for "Russian oven" is a cognate, "(russkaya) pech".

The influence of French cuisine in the 19th century may have led to the development of lighter blini. According to Lesley Chamberlain: "In a full Russian obed, blini are served after the cold zakuski. They may be followed by consommé, then pies and then the main meat course. For all this you would need a gargantuan appetite..."

== Varieties ==
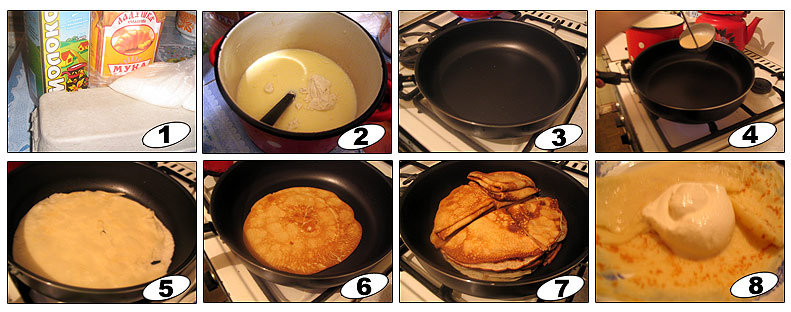
The preparation of bliny

Some ways that blini are prepared and served include the following:

- Blini made from batter containing various additions such as grated potato or apple and raisins.
- Blini covered with butter, sour cream, varenie or jam, honey or caviar (whitefish, salmon or traditional sturgeon).

They may be folded or rolled into a tube with sweet or salty fillings such as varenye, fruit, berry, mashed potatoes, tvorog, cooked ground meat, cooked chicken, salmon, chopped boiled eggs with green onions or chopped mushrooms.

- Blini made by pouring batter over chopped vegetables, meat, or mushrooms put on a frying pan beforehand are called "blini s pripyokom."
- Caviar is a popular filling for blini during Russian-style parties and in foreign Russian-style restaurants.
- Buckwheat blini are part of traditional Russian cuisine. They are also widespread in Ukraine, where they are sometimes known as hrechanyky (Ukrainian: гречаники), and Lithuania's Dzūkija region, the only region of the country in which buckwheat is grown, where they are called grikių blynai (which is in fact literally "buckwheat blini").

Similar pancakes are eaten in neighboring countries, such as nalistniki in Belarus, although blini are also widely eaten.

== Gallery ==
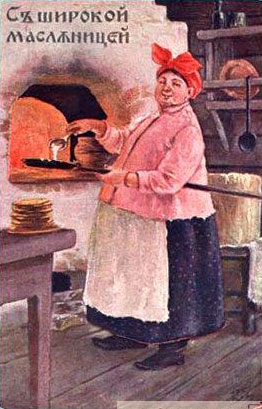
An old woman prepares blini in a Russian oven for Maslenitsa

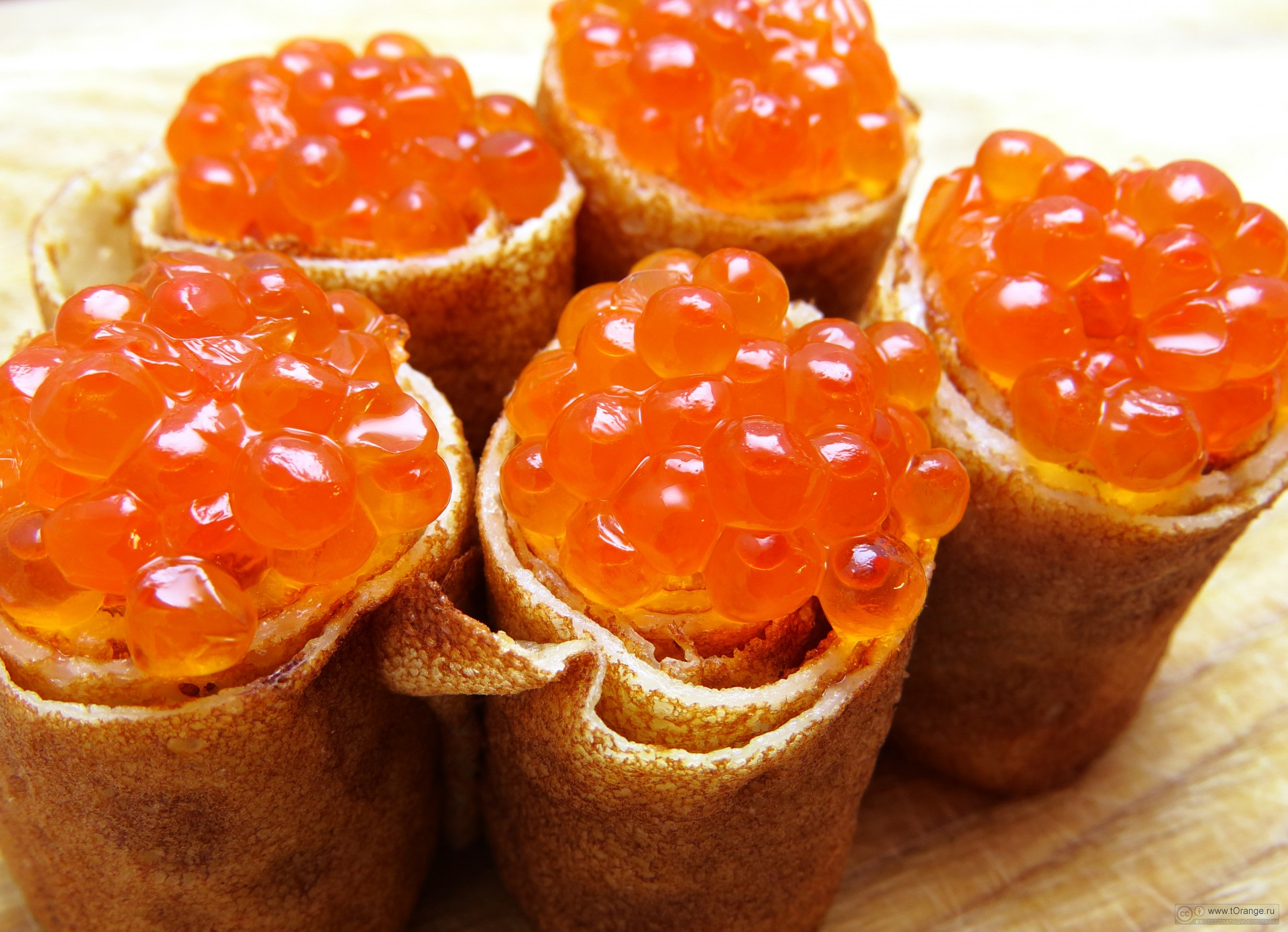
Blini served with red caviar

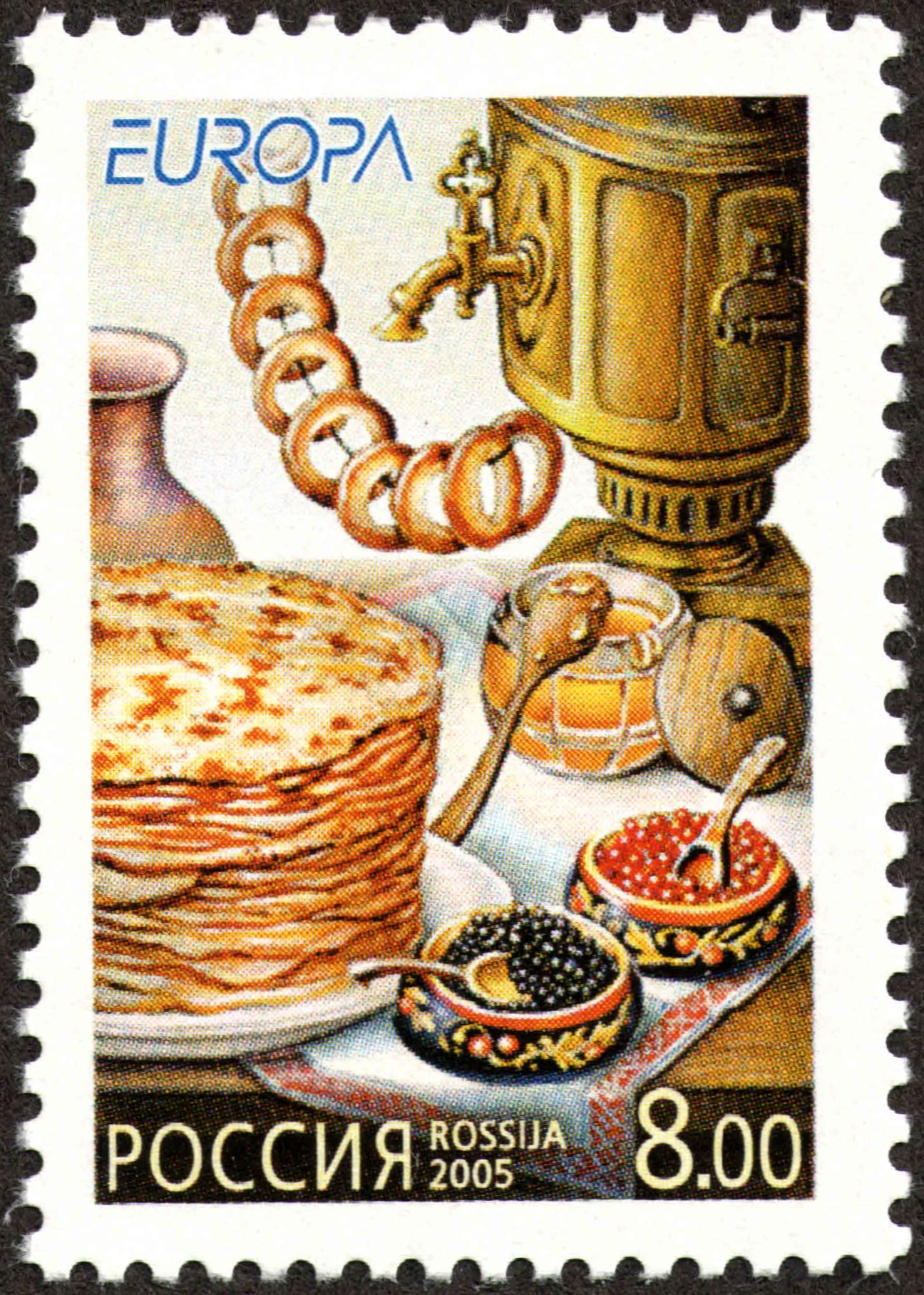
Russian stamp with blini and other stereotypes of Russian cuisine

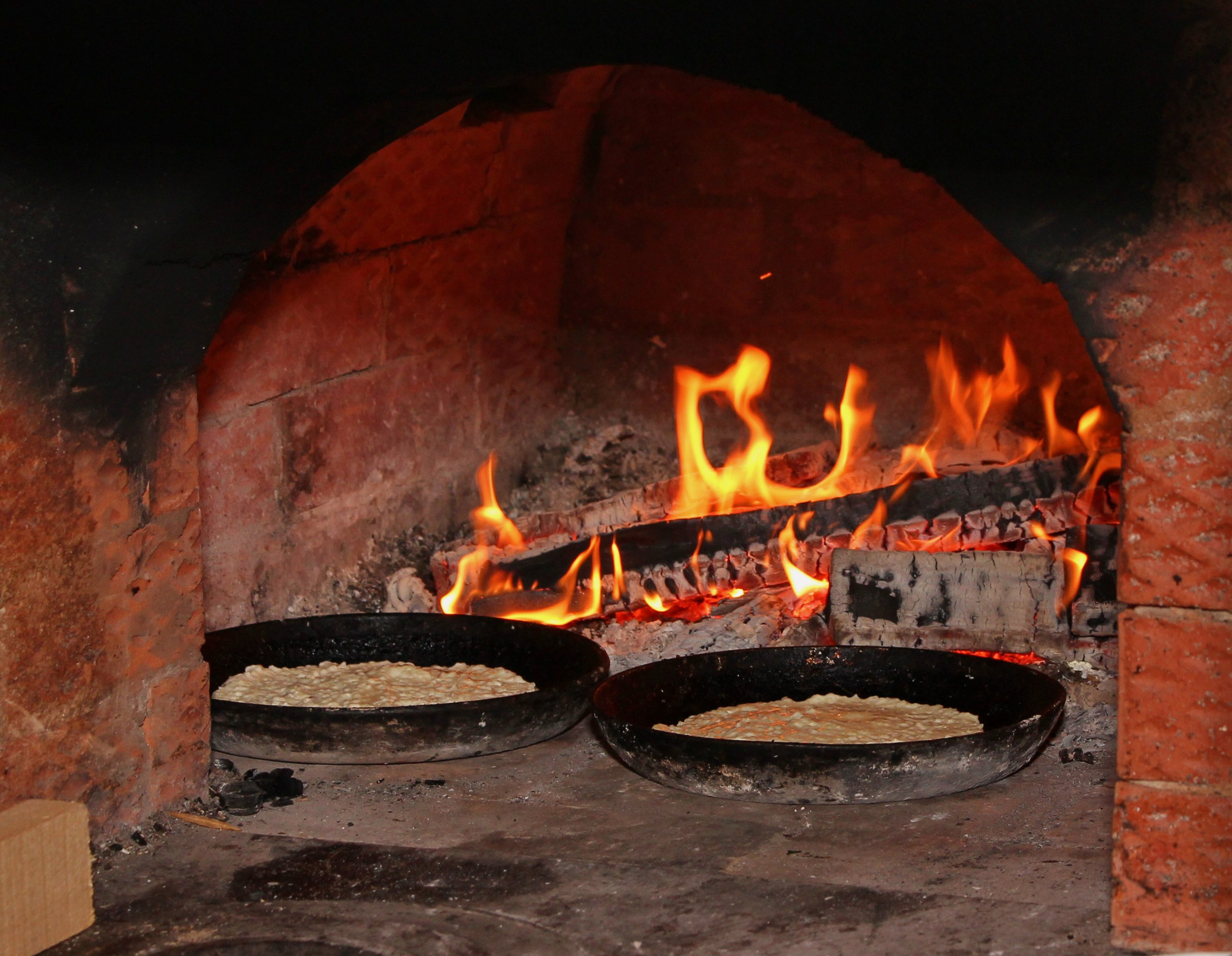
Blini fried in an oven in the Mari El Republic, Russia

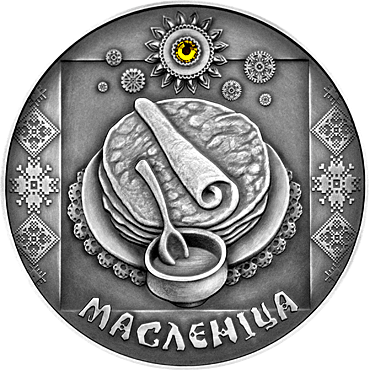
Belarusian commemorative coin with Maslenitsa theme and the accompanying blini

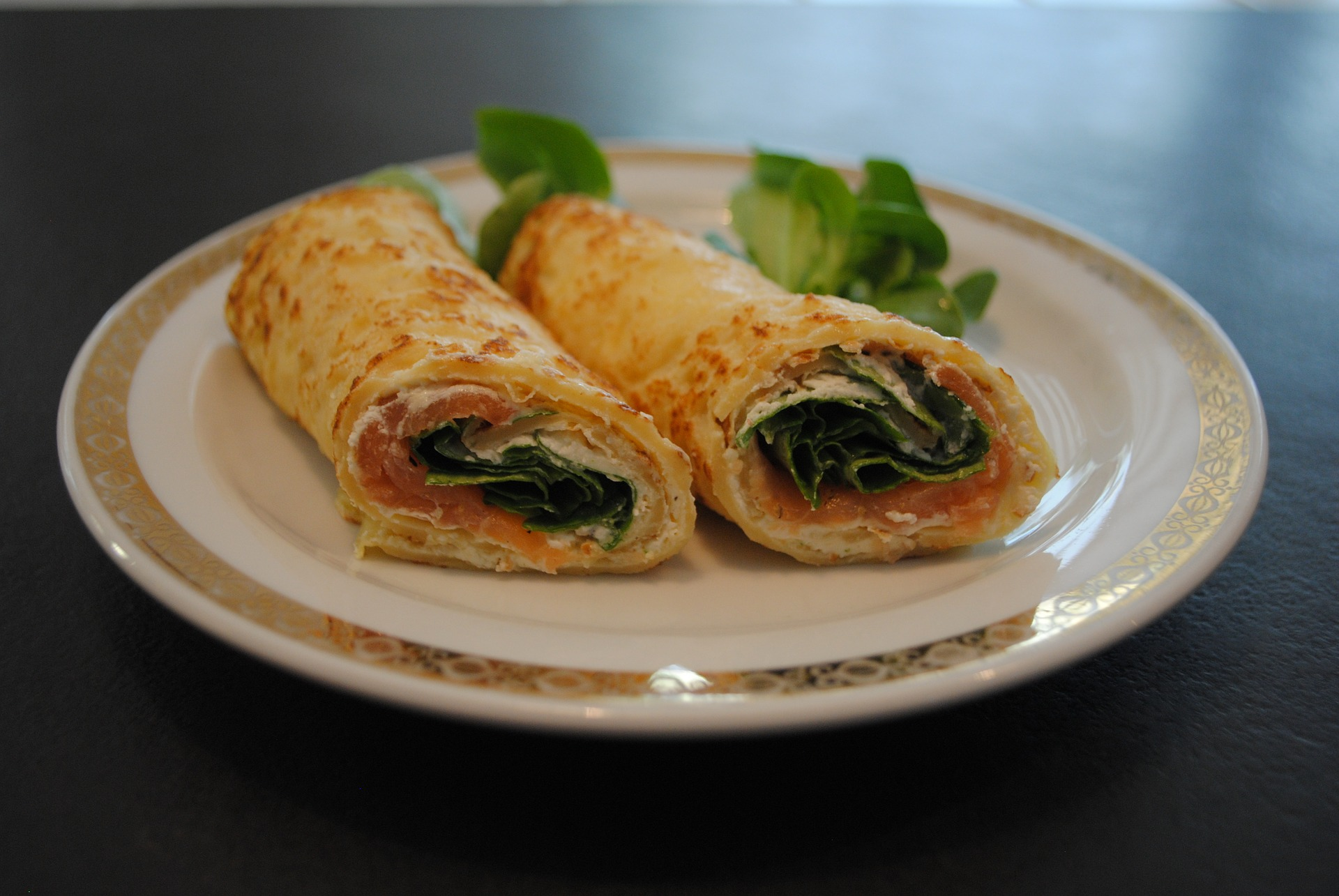
Blini rolled up

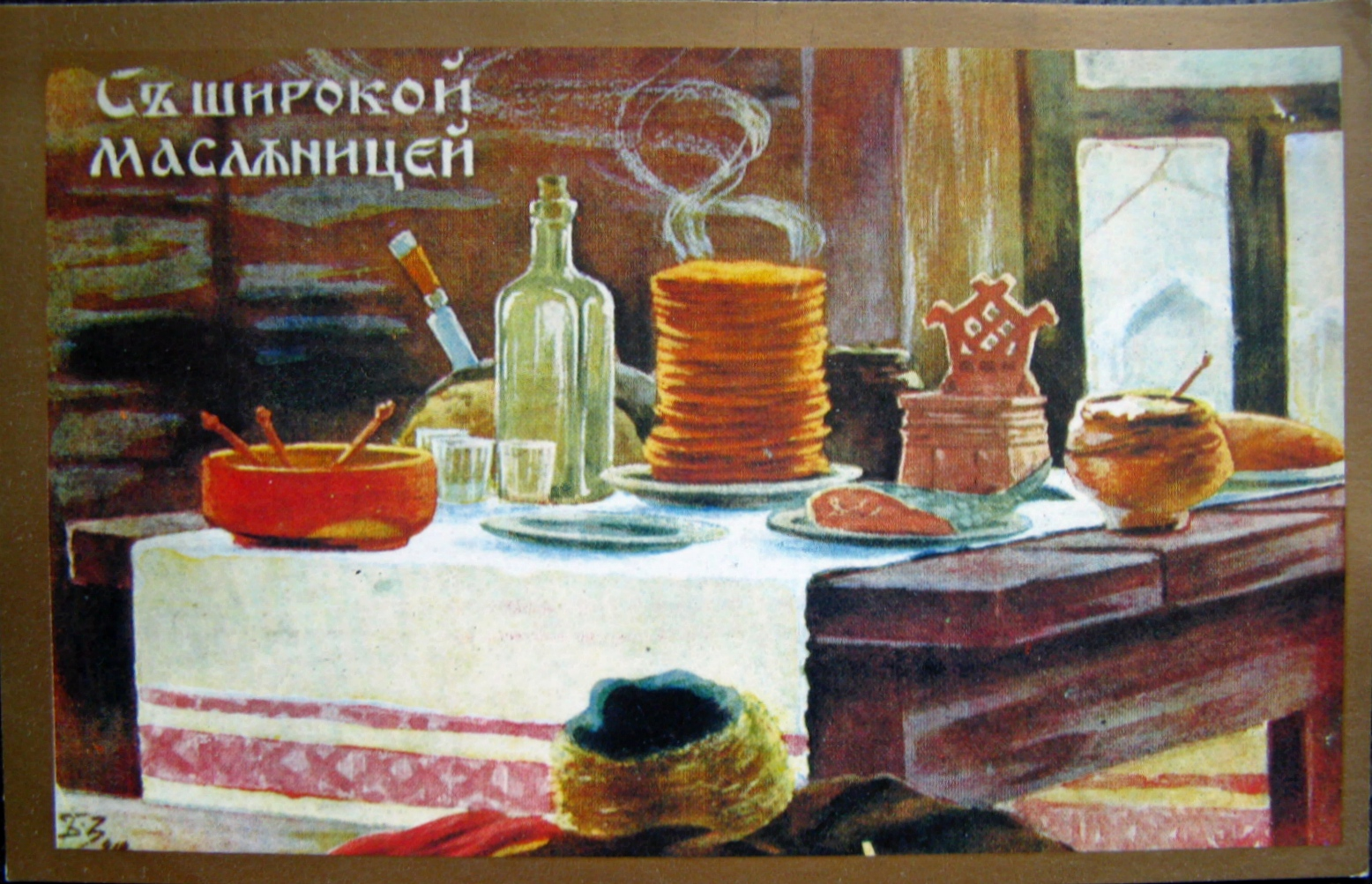
A pre-1917 Maslenitsa congratulation postcard

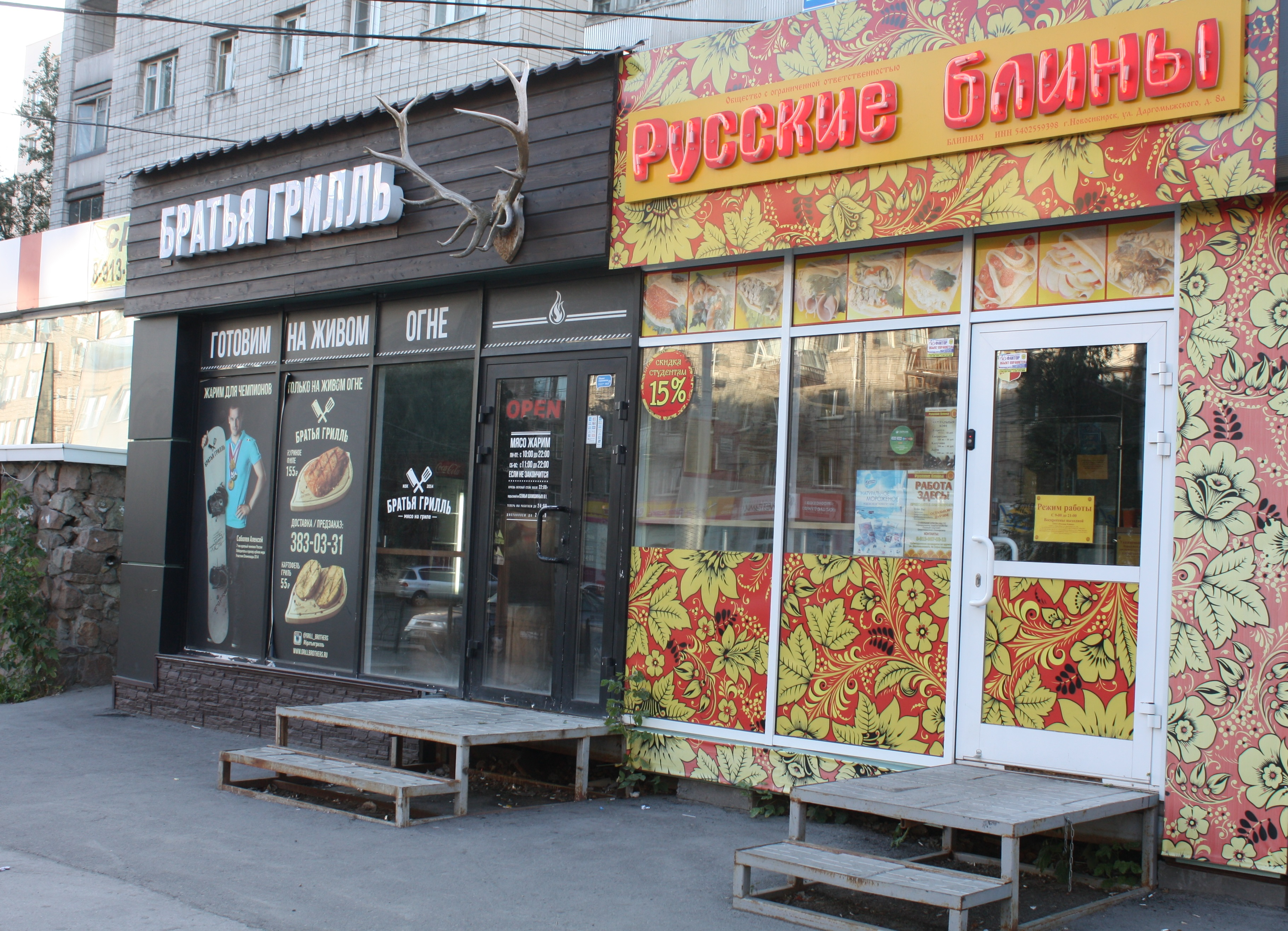
Blini shop in Novosibirsk, Russia

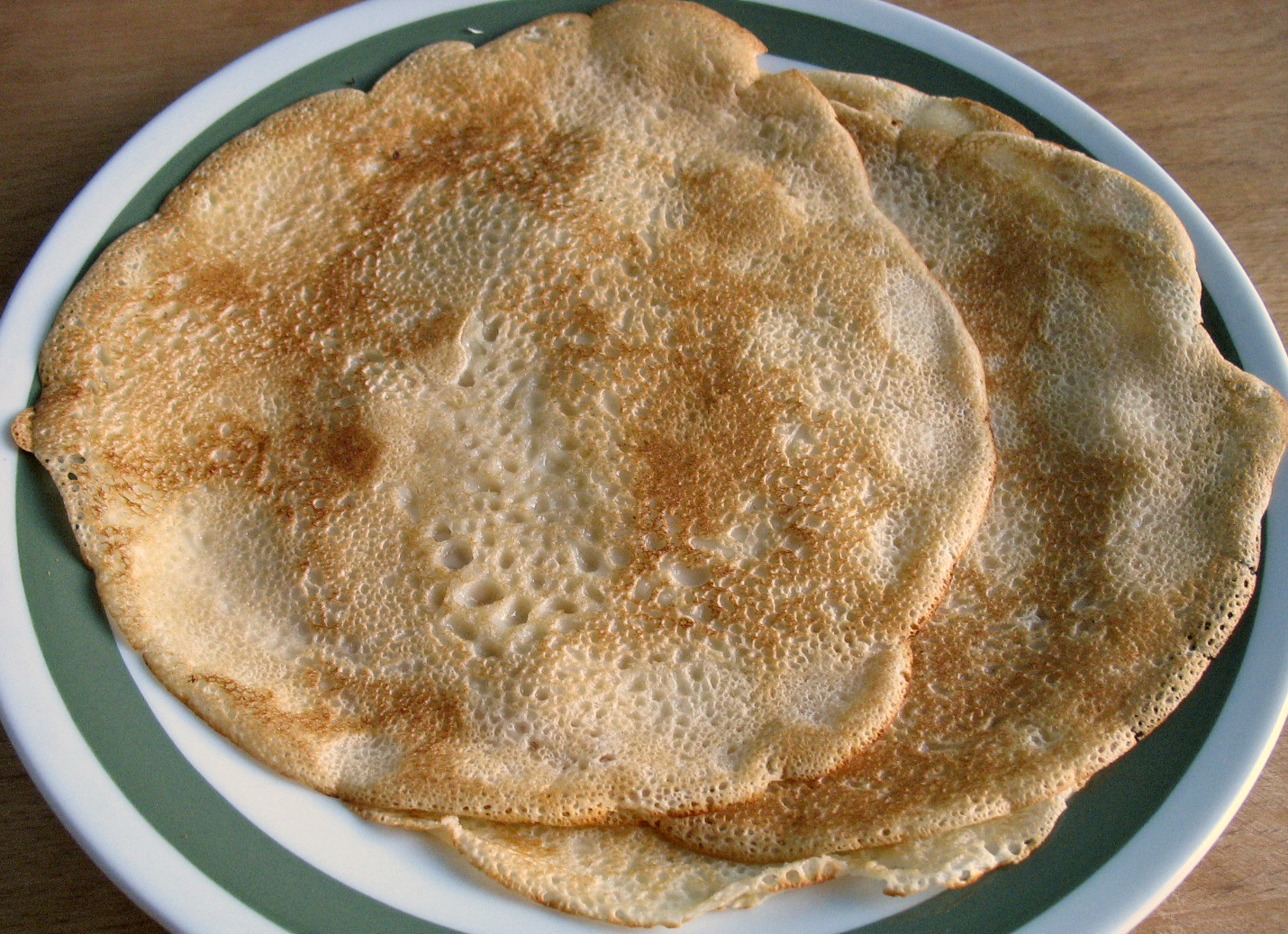
Lithuanian Blini (blynai or sklindziai)

== In popular culture ==
Aside from referring to pancakes, the word blin (блин) is used in Russian as a "minced oath" for the Russian swear word "блять" blyat', used as an interjection to express a negative emotion, akin to the words "damn!" or saying "Holy Moly!" while meaning "Holy shit!".

There are many Russian proverbs involving blini. For example, "Первый блин комом" ("The first blin is lumpy") is a figurative saying that the first attempt to do something is expected to be unsuccessful, said to calm down the person who failed the first try. An English equivalent would be "You must spoil before you spin".

== See also ==
- List of pancakes
- List of Russian dishes
