= Keftes (Sephardic) =

Sephardic Jewish fritters

Keftes, also known as Keftikes in Sephardic cuisine, are croquettes, pancakes, patties, or fritters, usually made with vegetables, and other ingredients. Sephardic keftes are not the same as the non-Jewish kofta which are meatballs. Keftes might not contain meat, as opposed to the kofta which are almost always made mainly from meat.

Some keftes are eaten on holidays due to the ingredients or method of cooking which may be associated with that holiday. Especially common are the fritas de prasa or leek fritters, traditionally served on Rosh Hashana, Hannukah and Passover.

== Varieties ==
- Keftes de karne—ground-beef meat patties
- Keftes de espinaka/spinaka—made with spinach
- Keftes de lentejas—lentil patties
- Keftes de gayina or Keftikes de poyo—chicken croquettes/chicken patties
- Keftes de patata kon karne—potato and meat patties
- Keftes de pescado/pescada/pishkado—croquettes made with fish and mashed potatoes.
- Keftes de prasa or Keftes de puero—made with leeks
- Keftes de prasa i karne—made with leeks and meat

== Holidays ==
Keftes de prasa are popular all year round at holidays

=== Rosh Hashana ===
Keftikes de prassa or keftes de prasa i karne are also known as yehi rasones or yehi ratsones (Hebrew: "May it be Your Will"). The leeks in this dish are a symbolic food on Rosh Hashana because of the puns of the name of the food in Hebrew or Aramaic. Leeks or foods made with leeks are eaten during a special seder on Rosh Hashana as a demonstration of a particular wish to be God's will.

The symbolism of the leeks is the pun of its name in Hebrew, karti, which is similar to yikartu, meaning to be cut off. The yehi rason of karti is a wish that the enemies of Jews will be "cut off".

=== Hanukkah ===
Keftes de prasa especially, or any kefte for that matter, are eaten at Hanukkah because they are fried. Keftes de prasa, which are made without meat, are pancake-like and are particularly suited to being oily as are most Hanukkah foods.

== See also ==
- Fritas de prasa
- Sephardic Jewish cuisine

== Bibliography ==
- A Fistful of Lentils: Syrian-Jewish Recipes from Grandma Fritzie's Kitchen, Jennifer Felicia Abadi, Harvard Common Press
- The New Jewish Holiday Cookbook, Gloria Kaufer Greene, Crown, 1999
- Sephardic Flavors: Jewish Cooking of the Mediterranean, Joyce Goldstein and Beatriz Da Costa, Chronicle Books, 2000
- Sephardic Israeli Cuisine: A Mediterranean Mosaic, Sheilah Kaufman, Hippocrene Books, 2002
- The Sephardic Table: The Vibrant Cooking of the Mediterranean Jews, Pamela Grau Twena, Houghton Mifflin Harcourt, 1998
- The World Of Jewish Cooking: More Than 500 Traditional Recipes from Alsace to Yemen, Gil Marks, Simon & Schuster, 1999
