= Fritas de prasa =

Sephardic Jewish leek fritters

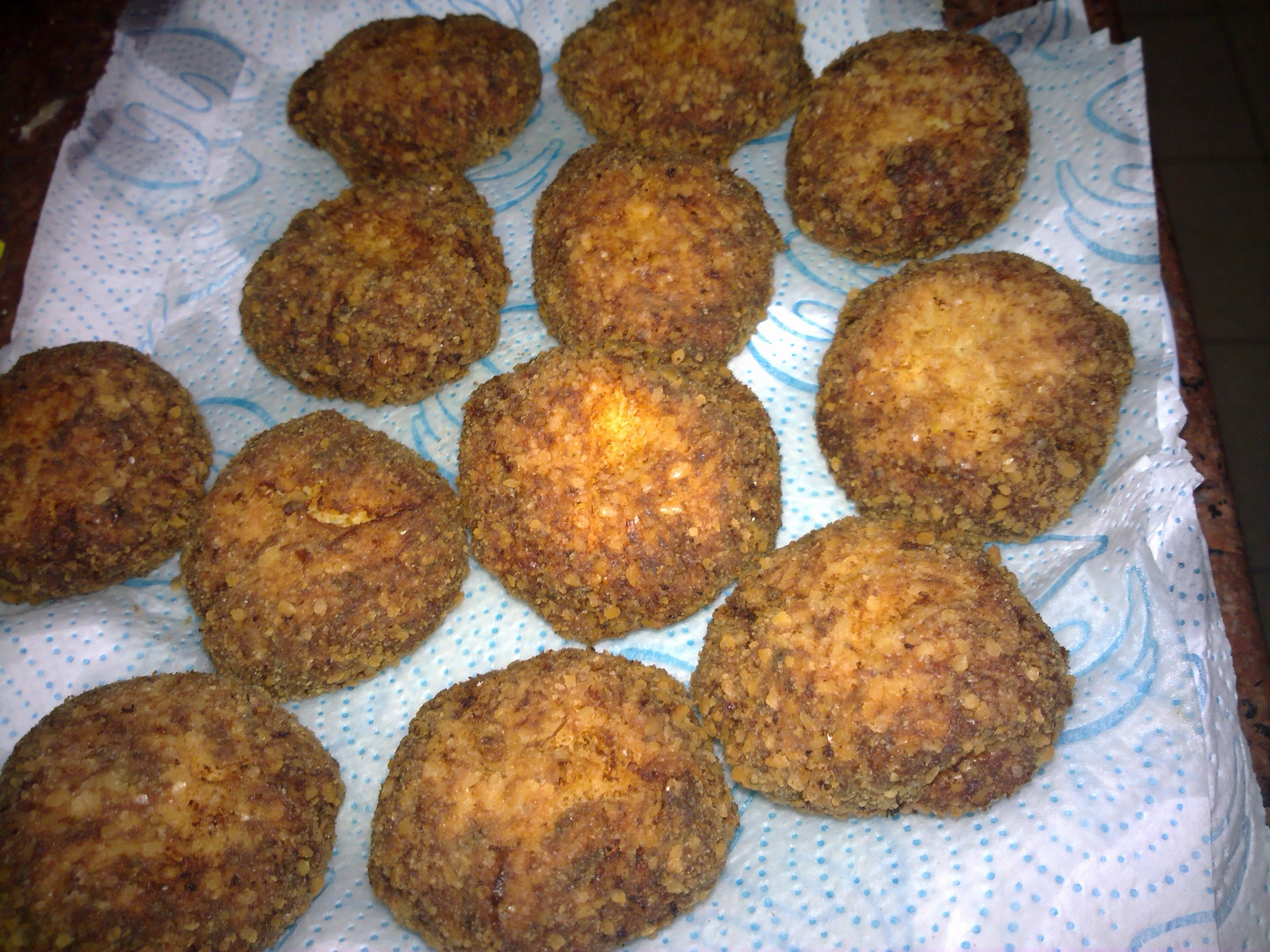
- Fritas de prasa
- Alternative names: Keftes de prasa, koftas de prasa, leek patties, potato-leek patties, Sephardi latkes
- Type: fritters, patties
- Course: Appetizer
- Region or state: Possibly Spain; today popular in Israel and the Sephardic Jewish diaspora
- Associated cuisine: Sephardi Jewish cuisine, Israeli cuisine
- Created by: Sephardic Jews
- Serving temperature: Hot, traditionally served for Hanukkah, Passover, and Rosh Hashanah, although it can be served all year
- Main ingredients: Leeks, potatoes, egg, matzo meal, kosher salt, cooking oil

Fritas de prasa, also keftes de prasa and albondigas de prasa (Hebrew: קציצות כרישה, romanized: ktzizot krisha, lit. 'leek patties') are fried potato-leek pancakes common in Sephardic Jewish cuisine.

Fritas de prasa have been served by Sephardic Jews on Rosh Hashanah, Hanukkah, Passover since the time of the Spanish Inquisition and forced expulsion of Jews from Spain.

== Etymology ==
Tan and Hosking note that "the name reflects the journey of Sephardic cuisine". The term "prasa," meaning leek, originates from Greek and has influenced the Turkish word "pirasa." The word "kofte," referring to minced meat, is of Persian origin and is commonly used in Turkish cuisine to denote meatballs. The Spanish word "albondigas," used for meatballs, has its roots in the Arabic term "al-bunduq," which means hazelnut and, by extension, small round objects. It is likely that Jews in Spain adopted this term.

== Description ==
Fritas de prasa are similar to a latke.

According to Tan and Hosking, this dish "would be listed among the top five typically Jewish dishes among Turkish Jews."

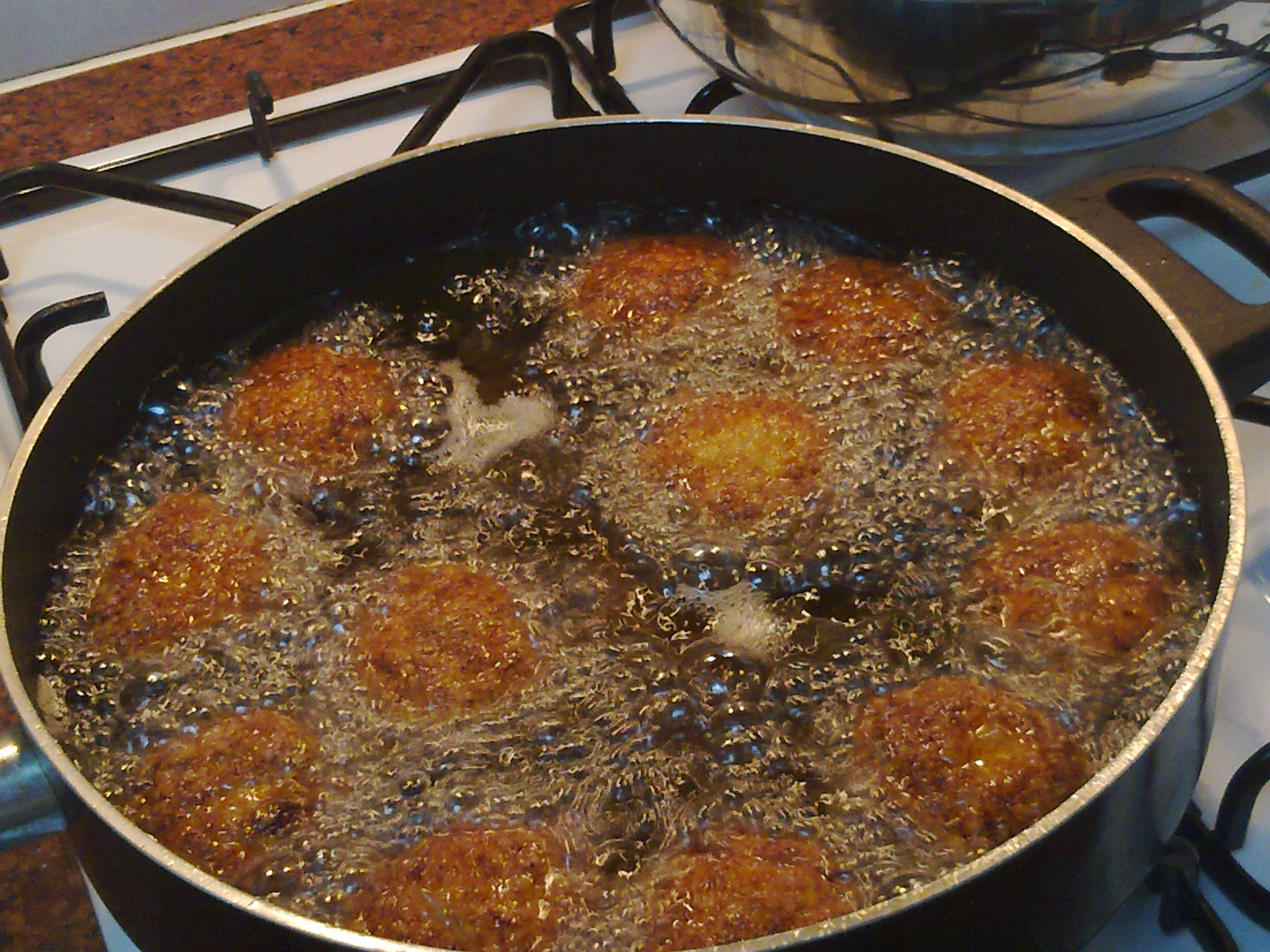
Prasa fritters being fried

== See also ==
- Keftes
- Latkes
- Sephardic Jewish cuisine
- Israeli cuisine
