= Oladyi =

Small, thick pancakes or fritters common in East Slavic cuisine

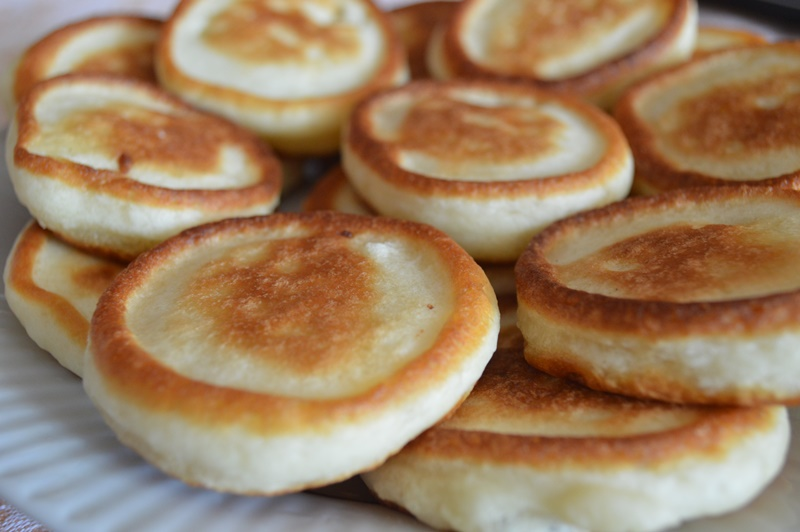
- Oladyi
- Type: Pancake
- Main ingredients: Batter, raisins, apples

Oladyi or oladi (Russian: оладьи [ɐˈɫadʲjɪ] pl., diminutive: оладушки, oladushki, sg. оладья, oladya [ɐˈɫadʲjə]; Ukrainian: оладки, oladky; Belarusian: аладкі, aładki) are small thick pancakes or fritters common in Russian and Ukrainian cuisines. The batter for oladyi is made from wheat or (nowadays more rarely) buckwheat flour, eggs, milk, salt, and sugar with yeast or baking soda. The batter may also contain kefir, soured milk or yoghurt. Oladyi may also include various additions, such as apple or raisins.

Oladyi are usually served with smetana (sour cream), as well as with sweet toppings such as jam, powidl, or honey. Savoury versions may be served with caviar, similarly to blini.

Generally, the term oladyi in Eastern Slavic cuisines may also denote fritters made with other ingredients, such as potato pancakes (картофельные оладьи), carrot fritters (морковные оладьи), bean pancakes (оладьи из бобовых), rice pancakes (рисовые оладьи), and summer squash fritters (кабачковые оладьи). Syrniki (tvorog pancakes) may also be considered a type of oladyi.

== Etymology ==
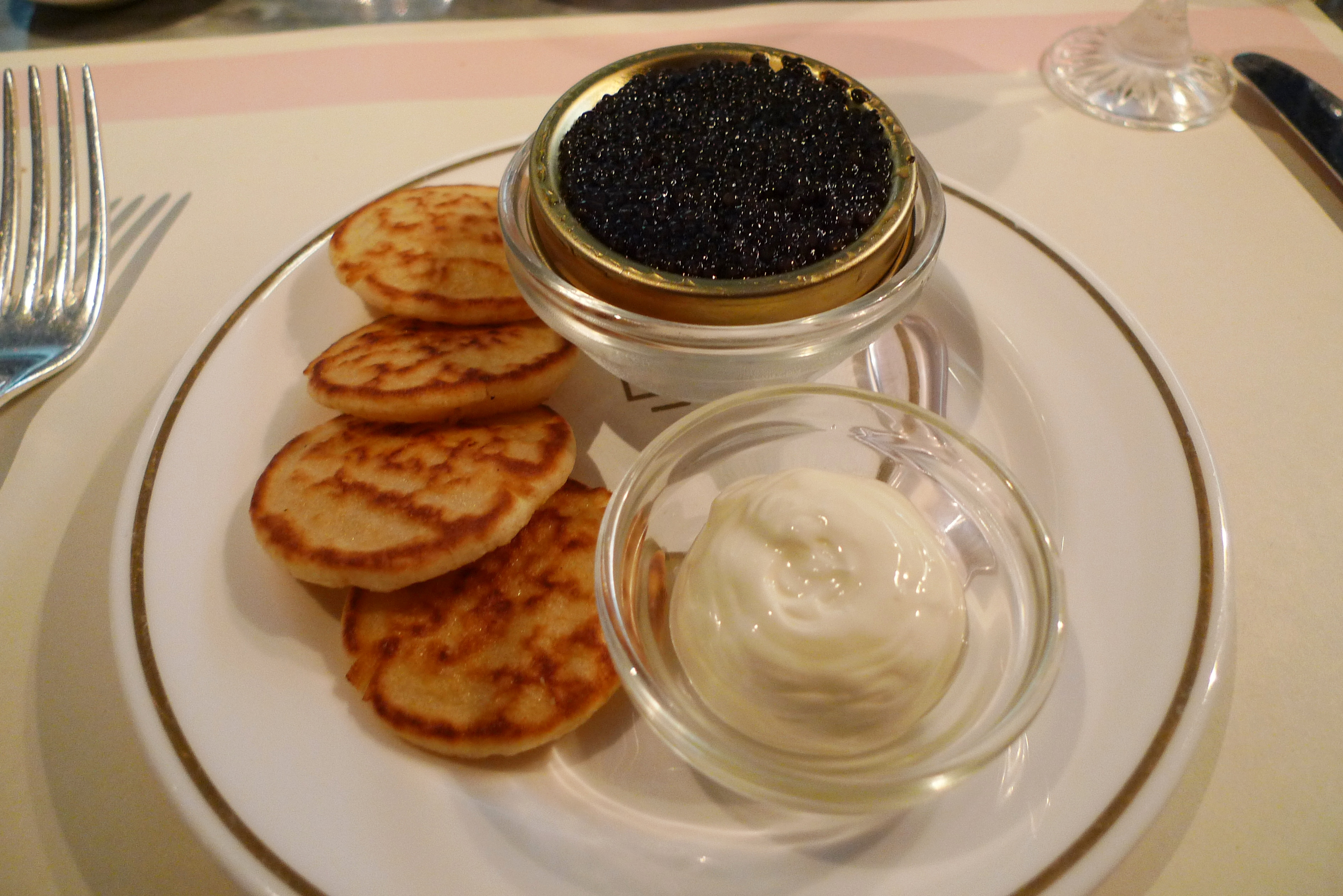
Oladyi served with caviar and smetana

The Old East Slavic word oladya as a proper noun is first attested in 1470. As a dish, it is first mentioned in Domostroy, the 16th-century Russian book of household rules, instructions and advice. The word derives from Ancient Greek ἐλάδιον, diminutive of ἔλαιον, "olive oil", "oily substance".

The word latke denoting potato pancakes in Jewish cuisine is derived from oladka.

== Sources ==
- П. В. Абатуров; et al. (1955). М. О. Лифшиц (ed.). Кулинария. Москва: Госторгиздат, Министерство пищевой промышленности СССР. [P. V. Abaturov; et al. (1955). M. O. Lifschitz (ed.). Cookery (in Russian). Moscow: Gostorgizdat, USSR Ministry of Food Industry.]
- Olena Benediktova (2016). 25 Popular Dishes from Ukraine. Olenka Books. ISBN 978-1-31018-162-7.
- Matthew Goodman (2001-11-23). "On Chanukah, Cheese Was the Norm, But Then Came the Potato". Forward. Archived from the original on 2005-09-07.
- Marks, Gil (2010-11-17). Encyclopedia of Jewish Food. Houghton Mifflin Harcourt. p. 707. ISBN 978-0544186316.
- Елена Молоховец (1901). Подарок молодым хозяйкам (in Russian). Санкт-Петербург. A Gift to Young Housewives, English translation (shortened): Joyce Stetson Toomre (1998). Classic Russian Cooking: Elena Molokhovets' a Gift to Young Housewives. Indiana University Press. ISBN 978-0-253-21210-8.
- Tatiana Whitaker (2010). A Taste of South Russia. Tatiana Whitaker. ISBN 978-1-44618-668-8.
- Vasmer, Maksimilian Romanovich (1973) [1958]. "Etimologichesky slovar russkogo yazyka" (Этимологический словарь русского языка) [Russian Etymological Dictionary] (in Russian). Moskva: Progress.
