= Tartelette =

Small pastry shell baked to hold a filling

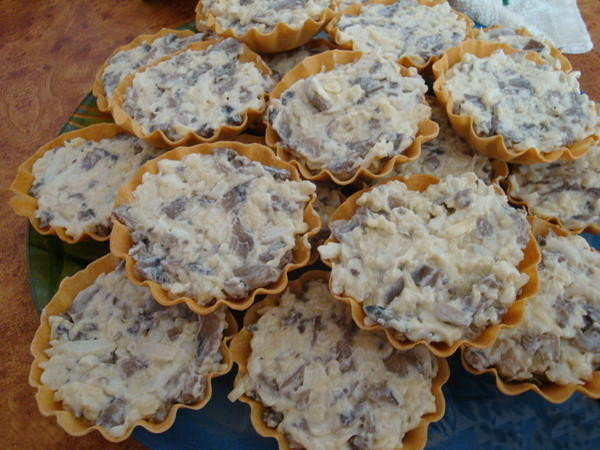
Julienne with smoked chicken served in tartlets

A tartelette or tartlet (French: tartelette, lit. 'small tart') is a pastry baked in the form of a small basket, up to 10 cm across, usually of shortcrust pastry, intended to be filled afterward. In European cuisine the filling is generally sweet: fruit with custard or cream, flan or chocolate. In Russia tartlets serve chiefly as vessels for "zakuski" appetizers (meat, fish or vegetable, dressed with sauces and seasonings). The tartlet is eaten together with its appetizer filling. A special basket-shaped baking mold is used to bake tartlets.

== History ==
According to the Russian food historian William Pokhlebkin, tartlets are used throughout international restaurant cuisine as small dough cups for fillings of meat, fish, mushrooms or vegetables dressed with sauces and spiced seasonings; a good kitchen puts a generous amount of butter, eggs and cream into the shell, which is accordingly meant to be eaten together with its filling. Pokhlebkin considered the tartlet an invention of Italo-Austrian cuisine, tracing it to the Neapolitan manner of pie-making (the Neapolitan torte), which the Viennese and French kitchens adapted as a decorative way of presenting all manner of leftovers, and sometimes plain side dishes, in an attractive, festive form.

== Preparation ==
In restaurant practice tartlets are baked in large batches in small individual molds. The molds are set tightly side by side and buttered inside; a single sheet of dough, rolled out thin, is draped over the whole array like a cloth and worked with a rolling pin so that it cuts into each mold, then pressed home by hand. Covered with oiled paper, the shells are baked in a slow oven for about half an hour, after which they can be released from the molds by flipping.

Tartlets intended for appetizers are baked from an unleavened dough in special molds; a single shell weighs 25–30 g and is filled only after cooling, then dressed with herbs and garnishes such as lemon, olives, and butter or butter-based mixtures. Appetizers in tartlets are served in the same manner as open sandwiches; they may also figure among the garnishes accompanying appetizers and main dishes of meat, poultry and fish. Typical fillings include salads of fish, crab, shrimp, spiny lobster and other seafood, or of meat, poultry and game; pâtés of liver, poultry, game or brynza; marinated fruit (apples, pears, grapes); and fresh fruit in sauce (oranges, mandarins, bananas, apples, pears, pineapple, kiwifruit). The filling matches the shell in weight, at 25–30 g.

== Sources ==
- Pokhlebkin, V. V. (2015). "Тарталетки" [Tartelettes]. Кулинарный словарь [Culinary Dictionary] (in Russian). Moscow: E. pp. 348–349. ISBN 978-5-699-75127-3.
- Ratushny, A. S.; Aminov, S. S. (2016). "Тарталетки" [Tartelettes]. Всё о еде от А до Я: Энциклопедия [Everything about Food from A to Z: An Encyclopedia] (in Russian). Moscow: Dashkov i K°. pp. 382–383. ISBN 978-5-394-02484-9.
- Gorys, Erhard. "Törtchen". Das neue Küchenlexikon (in German). Munich: Deutscher Taschenbuch Verlag. p. 543.
