= Julienne (dish) =

Russian appetizer of mushrooms and poultry

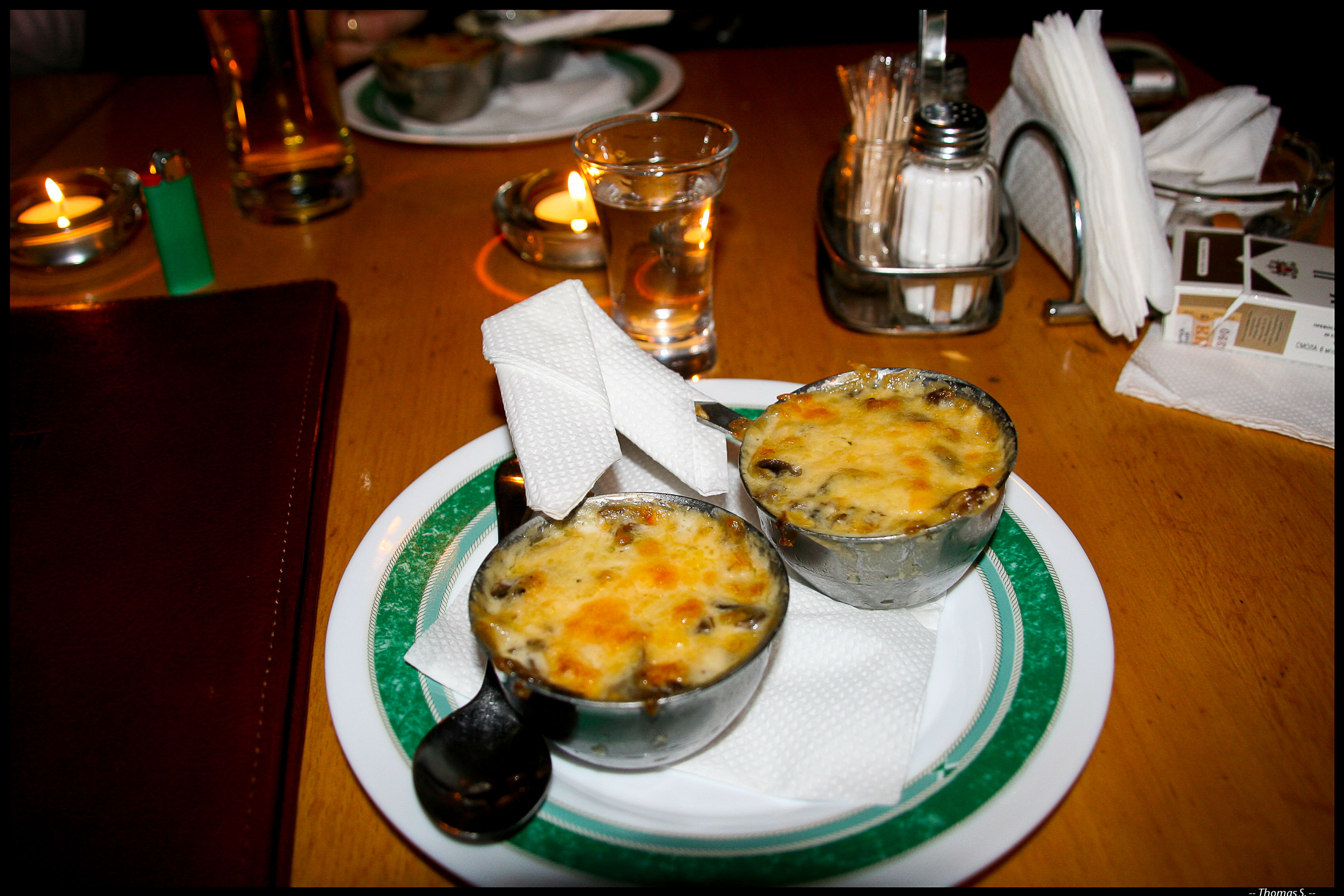
A portion of julienne served in two metal cassolettes with paper sleeves and a dessert spoon

Julienne (Russian: жюльен, romanized: zhyulyen, from French: julienne) is a complex hot appetizer, prepared chiefly from poultry or game and mushrooms cut in the eponymous manner, into thin strips or small slivers, and then baked in a small cassolette (French: cocotte de fête) with sour cream or a sauce under grated cheese. It was a popular dish of Soviet restaurant cooking. A similar mushroom appetizer is mushrooms in sour cream.

The dish takes its name from the French term for the thin cutting of young vegetables; in Russian cuisine, however, the word lost its original meaning and has come to denote a class of hot appetizers with no connection to French cuisine.

Russian кокотница serving vessel

Julienne is made with boiled fresh or dried mushrooms; poultry fillet is likewise cooked beforehand by frying or boiling. Besides mushroom and chicken juliennes, there are recipes based on meat, vegetables and seafood. Obligatory ingredients are onion fried in butter and grated cheese; according to V. V. Usov, the highest art in making a julienne lies in having the onion all but dissolve into the other ingredients. Two kinds of binding sauce are used: a sour cream one, with flour and egg, sometimes mayonnaise; and a milk or cream one, with browned flour. No spices go into the sauces, so as to preserve the natural aroma of the ingredients. Apart from cassolettes, single-portion skillets or oven-safe ceramic ramekins serve for the baking. Juliennes are brought to the table in cassolettes, a paper sleeve slipped over the handle, on special underliner plates or on pie and dessert plates covered with a single-use napkin, usually two pans to a portion. The dish is eaten with a teaspoon or a "mocha" coffee spoon, without transferring the contents onto the plate. A julienne is sometimes baked in one large dish and then served in vol-au-vents or tartlets.

Appetizers similar to julienne in their service are the "cocotte" (of mushrooms, crab or kidneys, named for the Russian: Кокотка) and the coquille (of fish, mussels and oysters, named for the shell-shaped coquille dish).

V. V. Pokhlebkin criticized the use of the name "julienne" for a non-vegetable dish, accepting it only for vegetable salads and soups.

== See also ==
- Veal Orloff

== Sources ==
- Anfimova, N. A. (2008). "Горячие закуски" [Hot appetizers]. Кулинария: учеб. пособие для нач. проф. образования [Cookery: A Textbook for Elementary Vocational Education] (in Russian) (2nd ed.). Moscow: Akademiya. pp. 277–278. ISBN 978-5-7695-4825-3.
- Glavcheva, S. I.; Cherednichenko, L. E. (2007). "Подача горячих закусок" [Serving hot appetizers]. Организация производства и обслуживания в ресторанах и барах: учеб. пособие [Organization of Production and Service in Restaurants and Bars: A Textbook] (in Russian). Novosibirsk: NGTU. p. 114. ISBN 978-5-7782-0856-8.
- Ermakova, V. I. (2007). "Подача горячих закусок" [Serving hot appetizers]. Официант, бармен: учеб. пособие для нач. проф. образования [Waiter, Barman: A Textbook for Elementary Vocational Education] (in Russian). Moscow: Akademiya. pp. 48–50. ISBN 978-5-7695-3194-1.
- Lifshits, M. O., ed. (1955). "Грибы в сметане, запечённые на сковороде" [Mushrooms in sour cream, baked in a skillet]. Кулинария [Cookery] (in Russian). Moscow: Gostorgizdat. p. 175.
- Pokhlebkin, V. V. (1988). "Жюльен" [Julienne]. О кулинарии от А до Я: Словарь-справочник [On Cookery from A to Z: A Dictionary and Reference] (in Russian). Minsk: Polymya. p. 60.
- Pokhlebkin, V. V. (2015). "Жюльен" [Julienne]. Кулинарный словарь [Culinary Dictionary] (in Russian). Moscow: E. p. 112. ISBN 978-5-699-75127-3.
- Ratushny, A. S.; Aminov, S. S. (2016). "Жюльен" [Julienne]. Всё о еде от А до Я: Энциклопедия [Everything about Food from A to Z: An Encyclopedia] (in Russian). Moscow: Dashkov i K°. p. 142. ISBN 978-5-394-02484-9.
- Usov, V. V.; Usova, L. (2017). "Жюльены" [Juliennes]. Основы кулинарного мастерства: искусство приготовления закусок и основных блюд [Foundations of Culinary Craft: The Art of Preparing Appetizers and Main Dishes] (in Russian). Moscow: Eksmo. pp. 127–129. ISBN 978-5-699-80934-9.
- Жюльен [Julienne]. Gastronom (in Russian).
