= Vinegret =

Russian salad

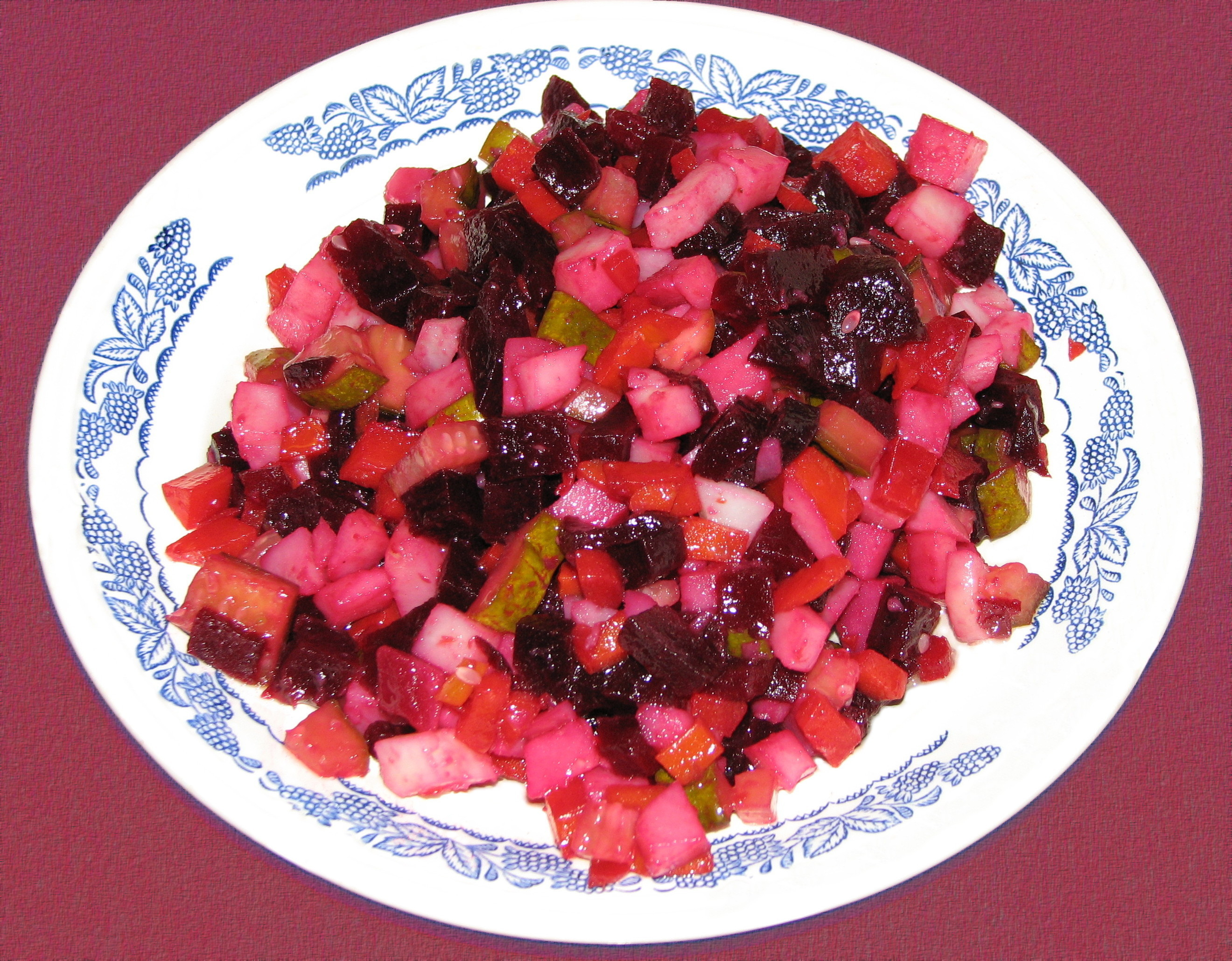
- Alternative names: Russian vinaigrette
- Type: Salad
- Course: Appetizers
- Associated cuisine: Russian
- Main ingredients: beet, potato, carrot, onion, sauerkraut and/or brined pickles

Vinegret (Russian: винегрет), or Russian vinaigrette, is a salad in Russian cuisine which is also popular in other post-Soviet states. The dish includes diced cooked vegetables (red beets, potatoes, carrots), chopped onions, as well as sauerkraut and/or brined pickles. Other ingredients, such as green peas or beans, are sometimes also added. The name comes from vinaigrette, a sauce which is sometimes used as a dressing for the salad. However, in spite of the name, vinegar is often omitted in modern cooking, and instead simply sunflower or another vegetable oil is used. Some cooks add brine from the pickled cucumbers or sauerkraut.

Along with Olivier salad and dressed herring, vinegret is served as zakuska on celebration tables in Russophone communities.

Despite their widespread popularity in Russia and Ukraine, the basic mixed salad recipes were adopted from Western European cuisines as late as the 19th century. Originally, the term vinegret denoted any mixture of diced cooked vegetables dressed with vinegar. Later the meaning changed to any mixed salad with beetroots. Modern Russian and Ukrainian cookbooks still mention the possibility of adding mushrooms, meat or fish, but this is rarely practiced.

Similar beetroot-based salads are prepared throughout Northern Europe. Examples are herring salad and beetroot salad in North German and Nordic cuisines (see also de:Heringssalat, sv:Rödbetssallad), as well as rosolli in Finnish cuisine, with the name for the latter stemming from rassol (Russian: рассол), the Russian word for brine.

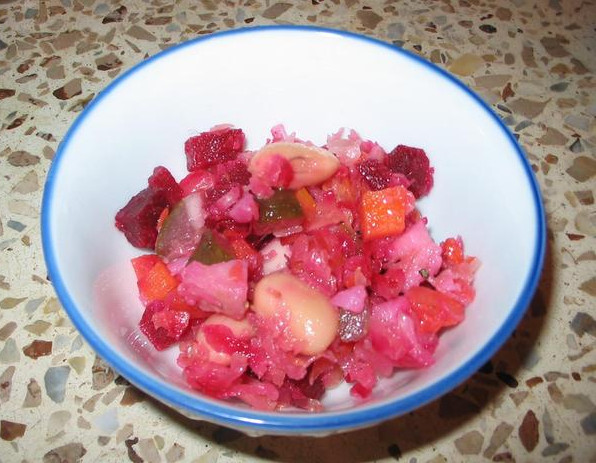
Vinegret with beans

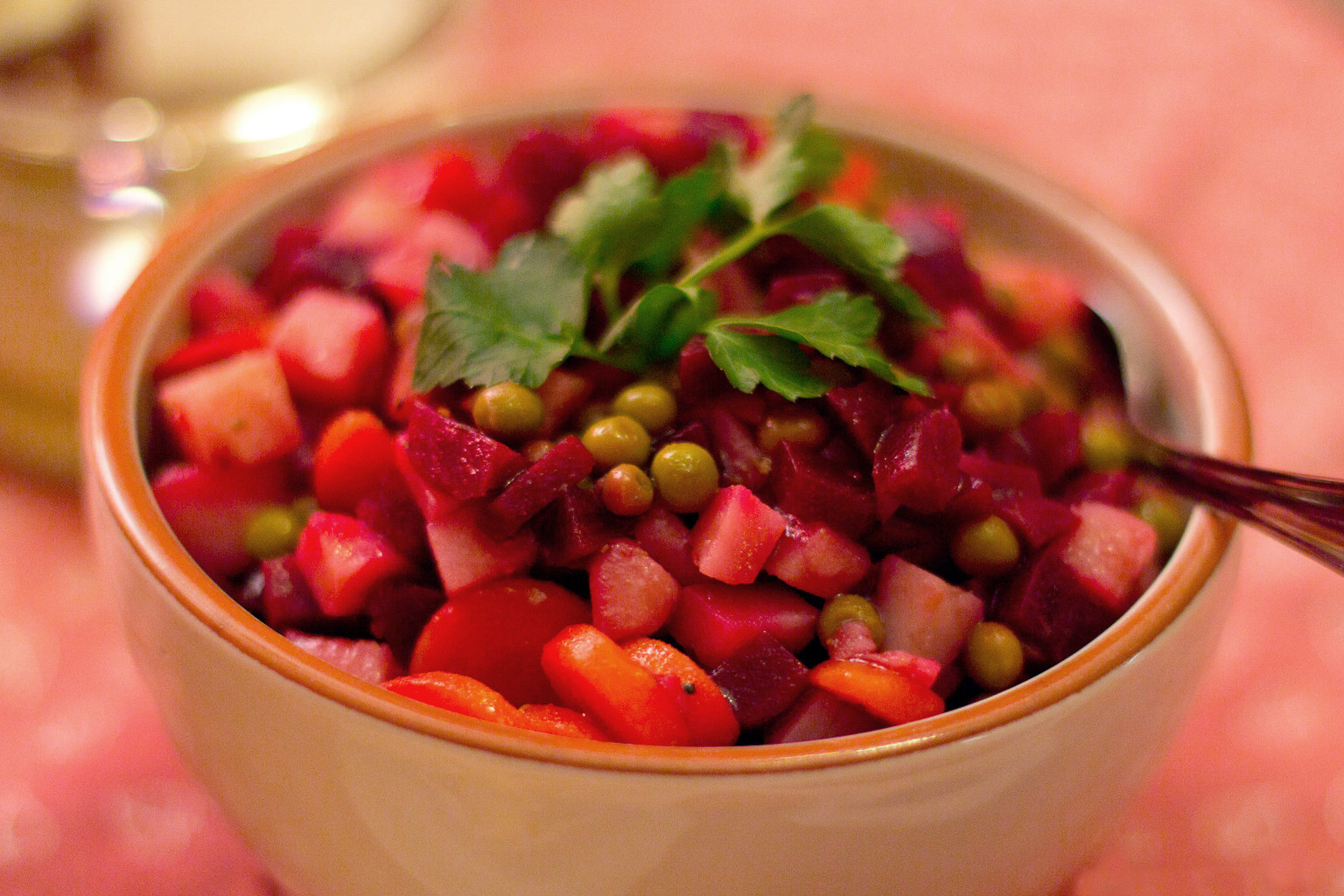
Vinegret with green peas

== See also ==
- List of Russian dishes
