= Rosolli =

Finnish Salad

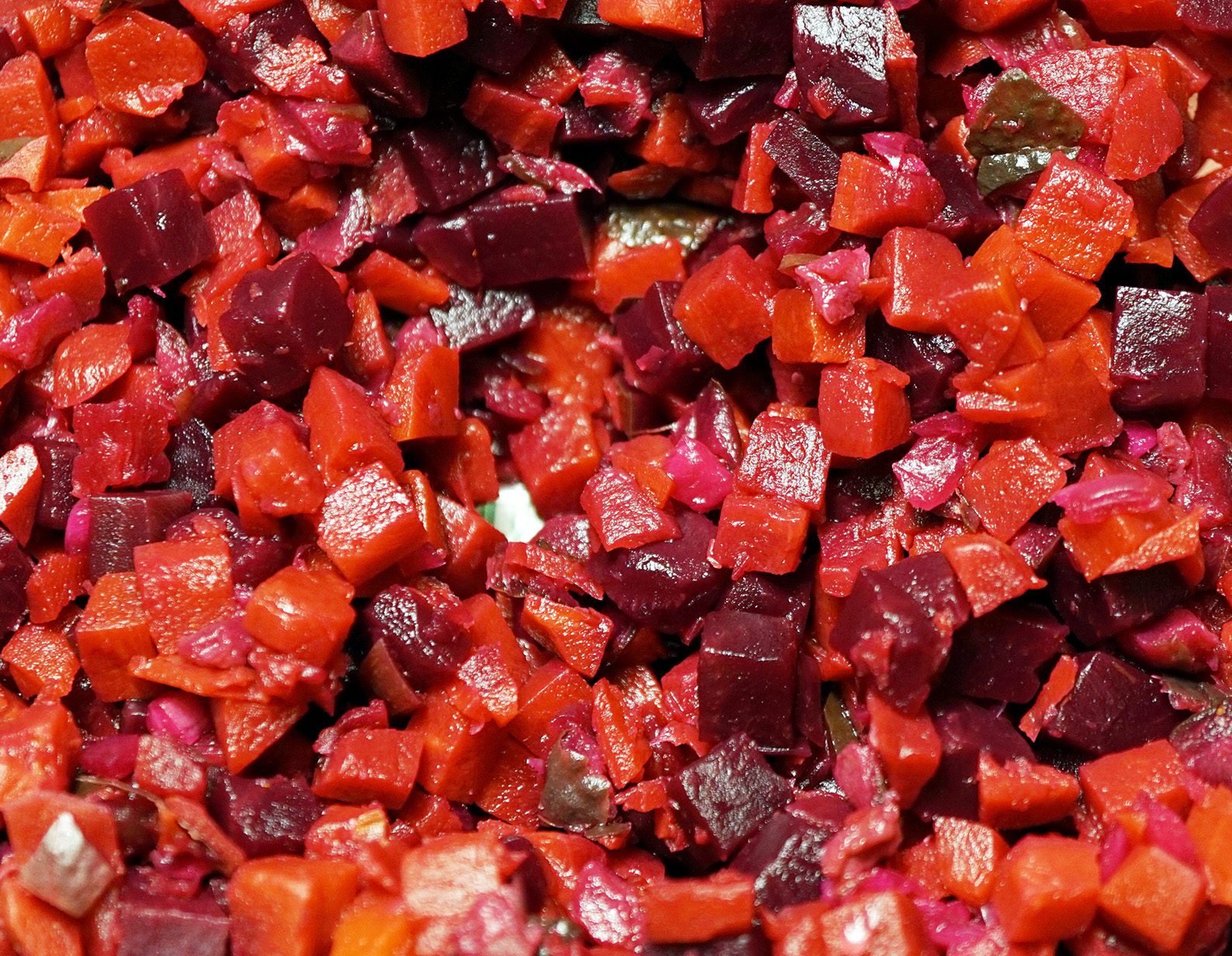
- The Finnish rosolli salad
- Type: Salad
- Place of origin: Finland, Northern Europe
- Main ingredients: potato, carrot, beetroot
- Variations: onion, apple, pickled cucumber

In Finnish cuisine, rosolli is a salad eaten mostly as a cold side dish, in particular as part of the traditional Finnish Christmas meal.

== Overview ==
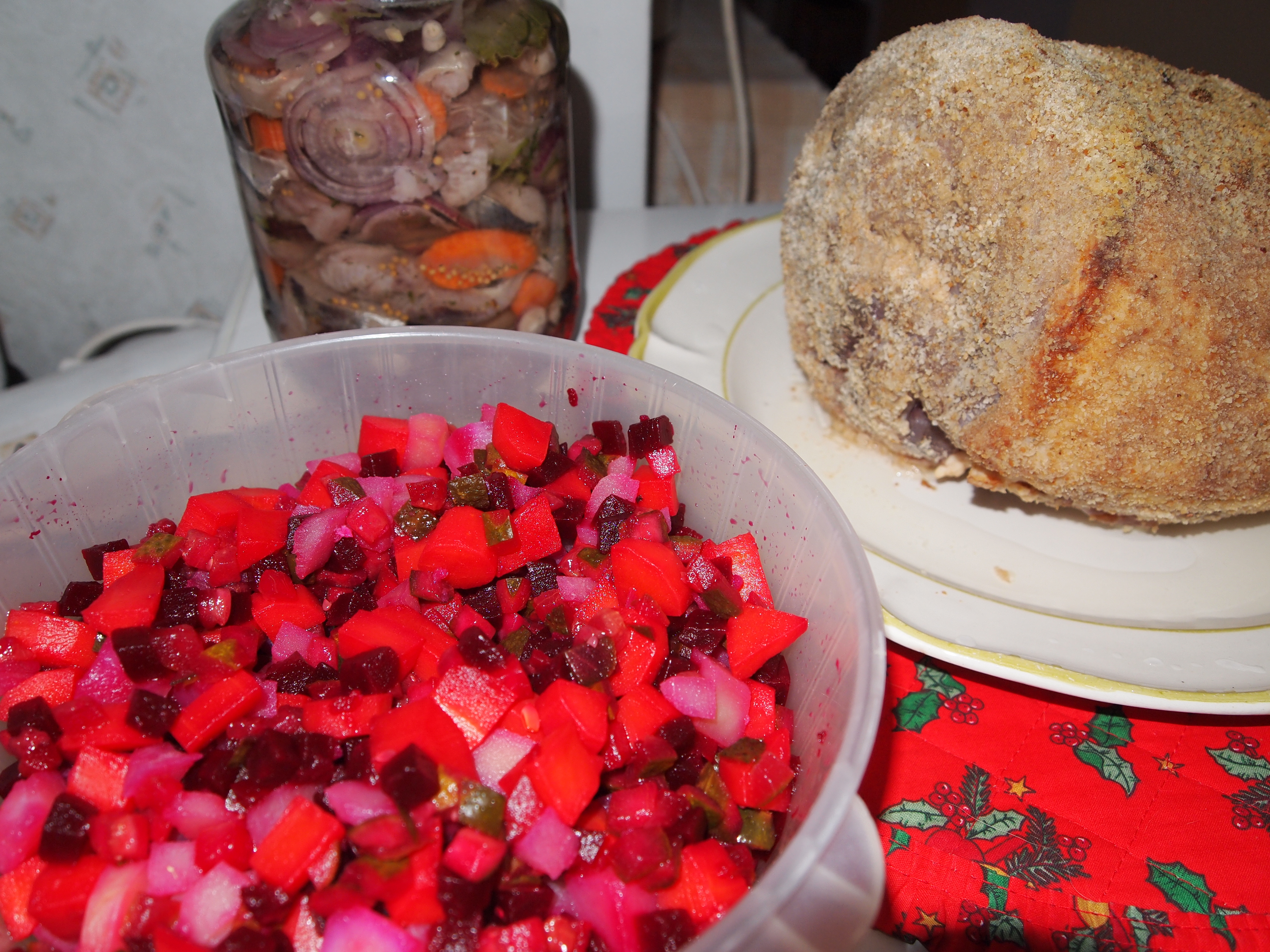
Rosolli in the foreground with lasimestarin silli ("glass-blower's herring", pickled herring with onion and carrot slices) and a Christmas ham in the background.

Rosolli is made of cooked, diced root vegetables, especially beetroot, carrot and potato, often combined with one or more of pickled cucumber (of either the vinegar or brine type), raw onion and apple. Variations may also include additional ingredients such as pickled herring or boiled egg, in which case the salad is more likely served as a starter (appetizer) rather than a side dish to a main course.

Rosolli is often served with a dressing made of whipped cream or a soured cream product available in Finland called kermaviili (being a type of viili made with sour cream), laced with vinegar or the pickling liquid of beetroot, which also colours the cream pink.

Similar dishes are found throughout northern Europe, from the Low Countries across Scandinavia to Russia. Especially the Russian vinegret is very similar to the Finnish rosolli.

== Etymology ==
According to some sources, the word rosolli comes from the Russian word rassol, meaning brine, although it is not known how this came to refer to the dish in question. In western Finland, alternative terms such as punainen salaatti (literally "red salad", rendered dialectically) or sinsalla (probably from the Swedish word sillsallad, for "herring salad") are traditionally used.

== See also ==
- Vinegret
- Herring salad
