= Red caviar =

Caviar made from the roe of salmonid fishes

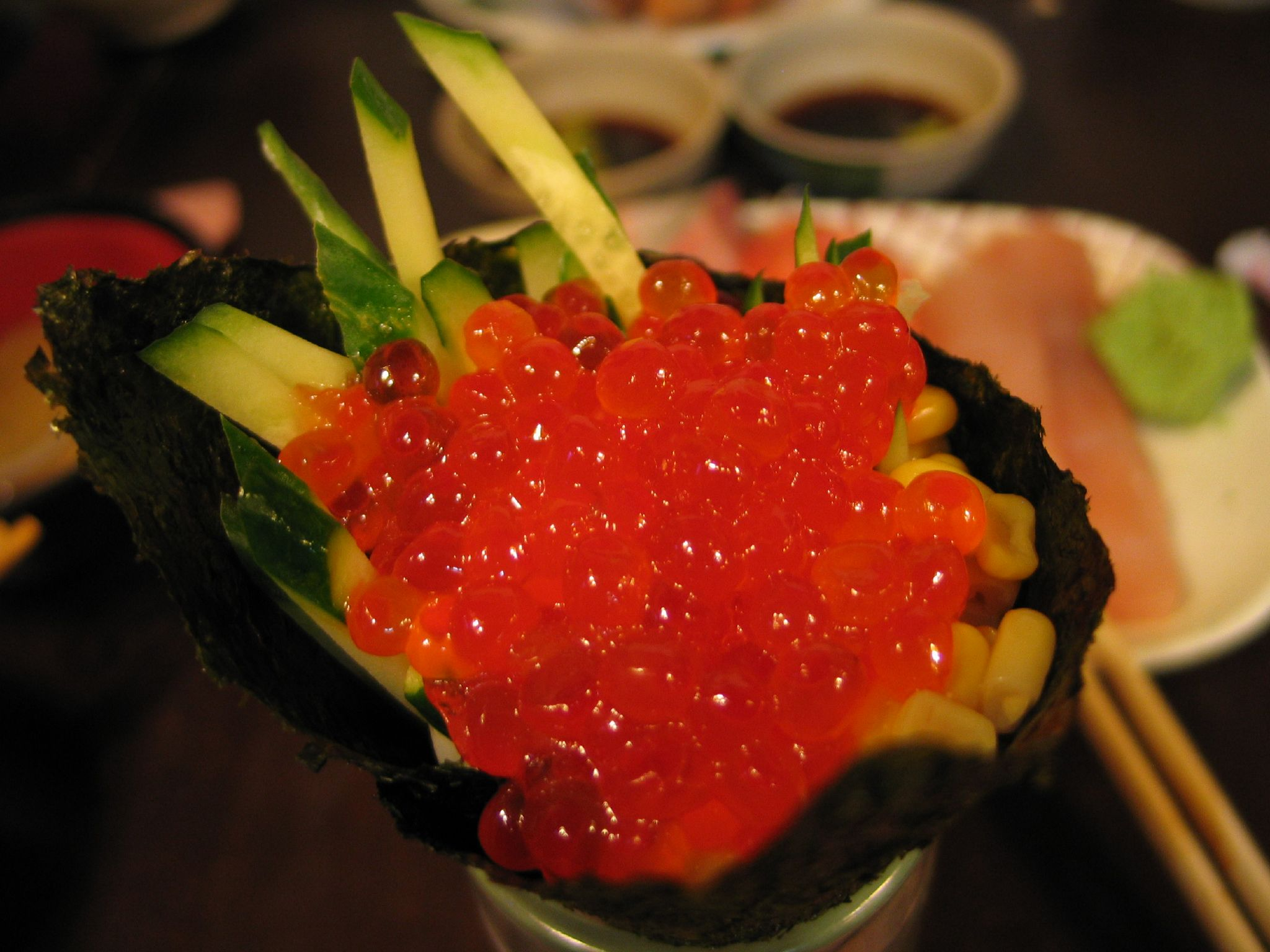
Ikura (salmon roe) sushi

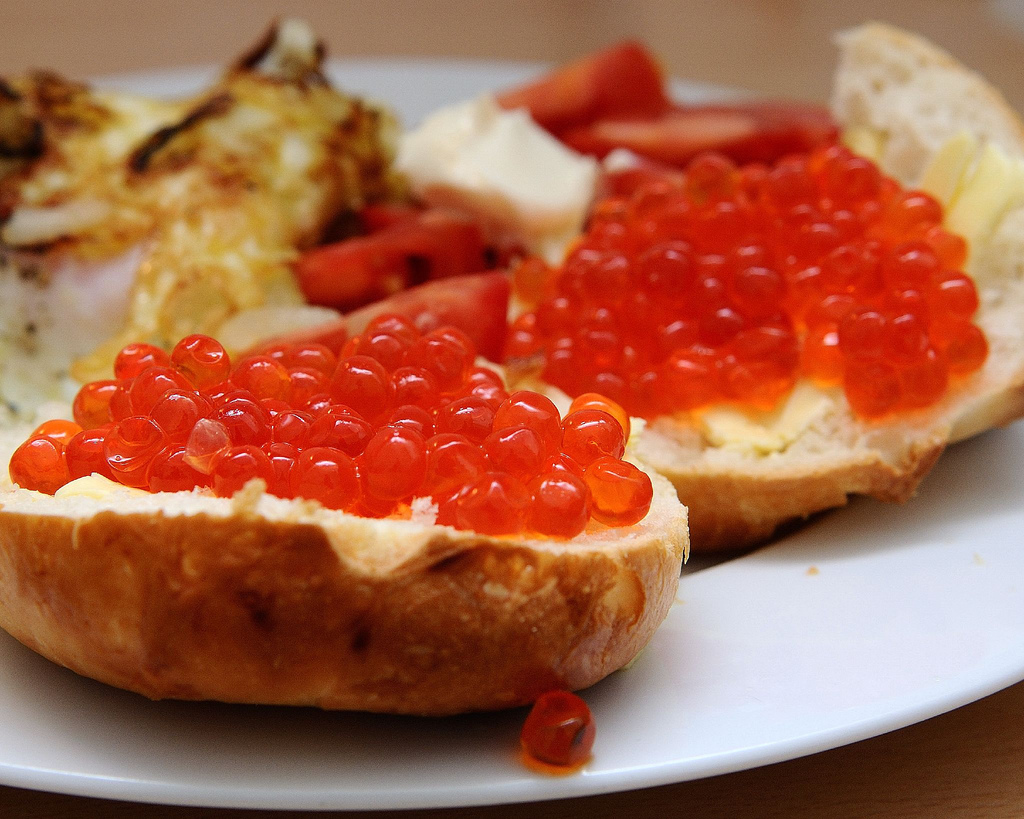
Red caviar open sandwich, a Russian zakuska

Red caviar, also known as salmon roe, is a caviar made from the roe of salmonid fishes (various species of salmon and trout), which has an intense reddish hue. It is distinct from black caviar, which is made from the roe of sturgeon.

Red caviar is part of Russian and Japanese cuisine. In Japan, salmon caviar is known as ikura (イクラ) which derives from the Russian word ikra (икра) which means caviar or fish roe in general.

In Japanese cuisine, it is usually marinated in salt or soy sauce and sake. The seasoning used varies between households. Many families pickle red caviar using only soy sauce, but some use dashi instead of sake or mirin.Ikura may be used in sushi or eaten over rice.

Russians enjoy red caviar appetizers (zakuski) on buttered bread, or on blini (Russian crêpes).
