= Mimosa salad =

Russian dish

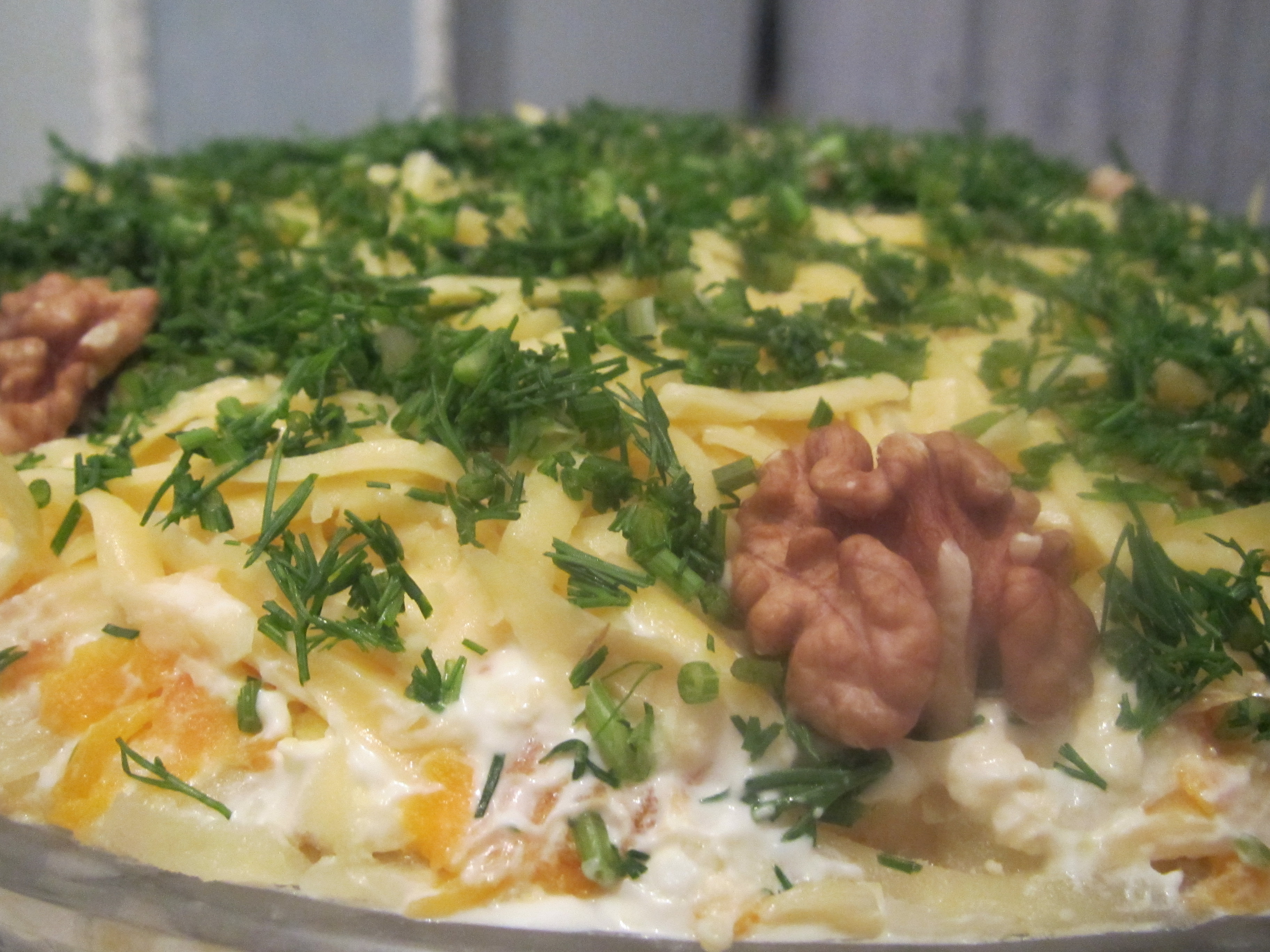
- Type: Salad
- Course: Zakuski
- Region or state: Soviet Union
- Associated cuisine: Russia
- Main ingredients: Canned fish, boiled eggs, grated cheese, onion, mayonnaise

Mimosa salad (Russian: салат мимоза) is a festive salad of which the main ingredients are cheese, eggs, canned fish, onion, and mayonnaise. Mimosa salad got its name because of its resemblance to mimosa flowers scattered on the snow. The similarity is achieved by crumbling and scattering boiled egg yolk on the surface. The salad's popularity in the USSR (and nowadays in the post-Soviet states) has led to the emergence of a wide variety of recipes.

== Preparation ==
A classic recipe is to layer ingredients in a bowl, with mayonnaise in between the layers. Typical ingredients include:

- Canned fish, drained, de-boned, mashed. Common sorts are salmon, Pacific saury, mackerel, or trout;
- Hard cheese, finely crumbled, sprinkled;
- Boiled egg whites, coarsely grated, sprinkled. Sometimes the egg yolks, without the whites, are used. Sometimes entire hard boiled eggs are used.
- Boiled egg yolks, finely crumbled, sprinkled on top;
- Onion, finely chopped, sprinkled;
- Mayonnaise.

Further ingredients may include:

- Butter, coarsely grated, frozen, sprinkled;
- Boiled potatoes, coarsely grated, sprinkled;
- Boiled carrots, coarsely grated, sprinkled.
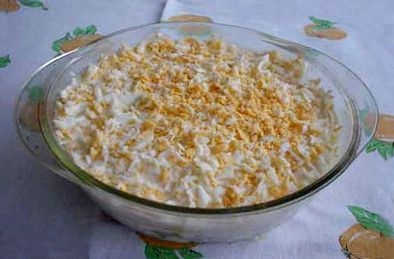
Mimosa salad, traditional decoration

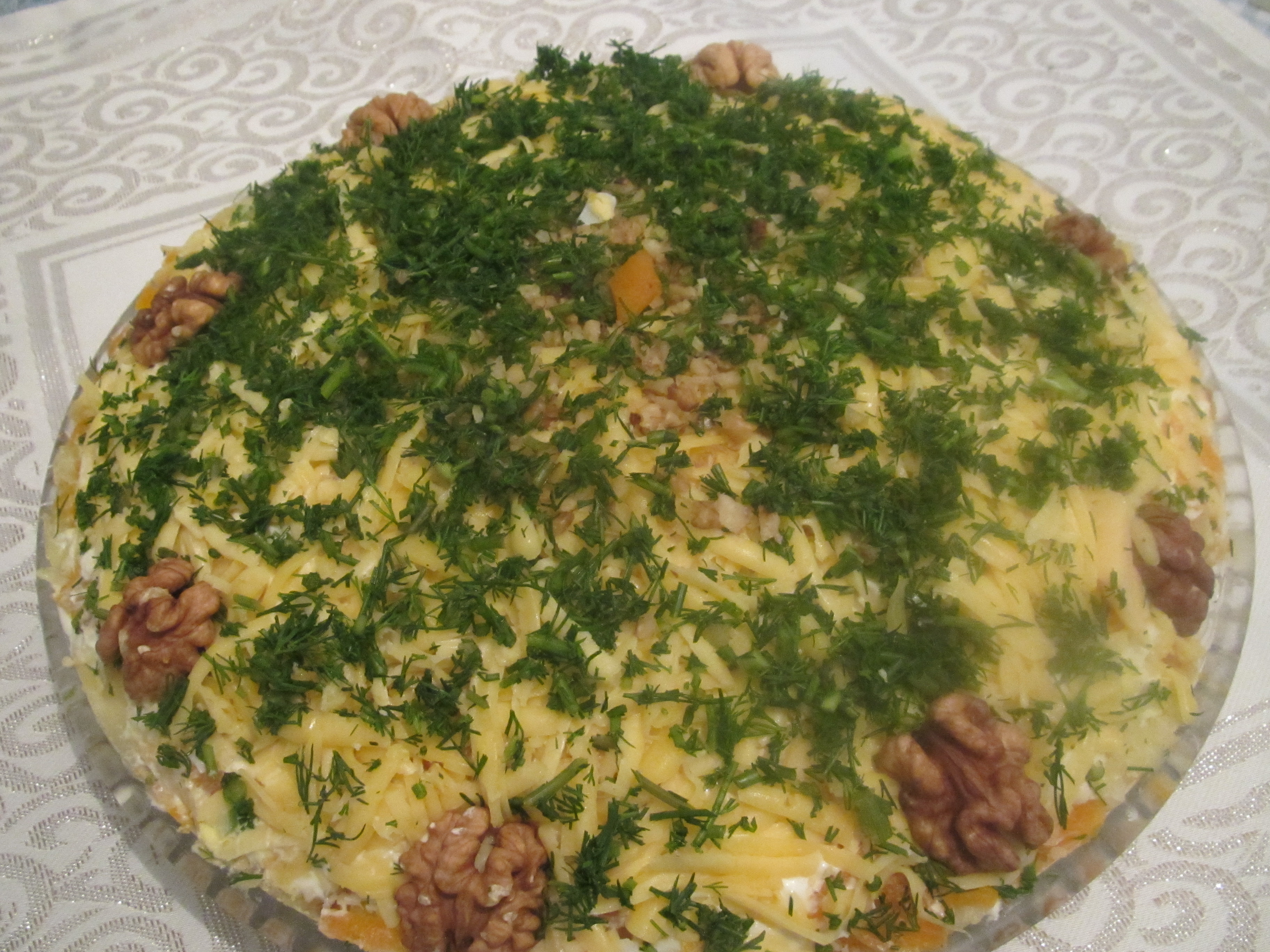
Mimosa salad, decorated with dill

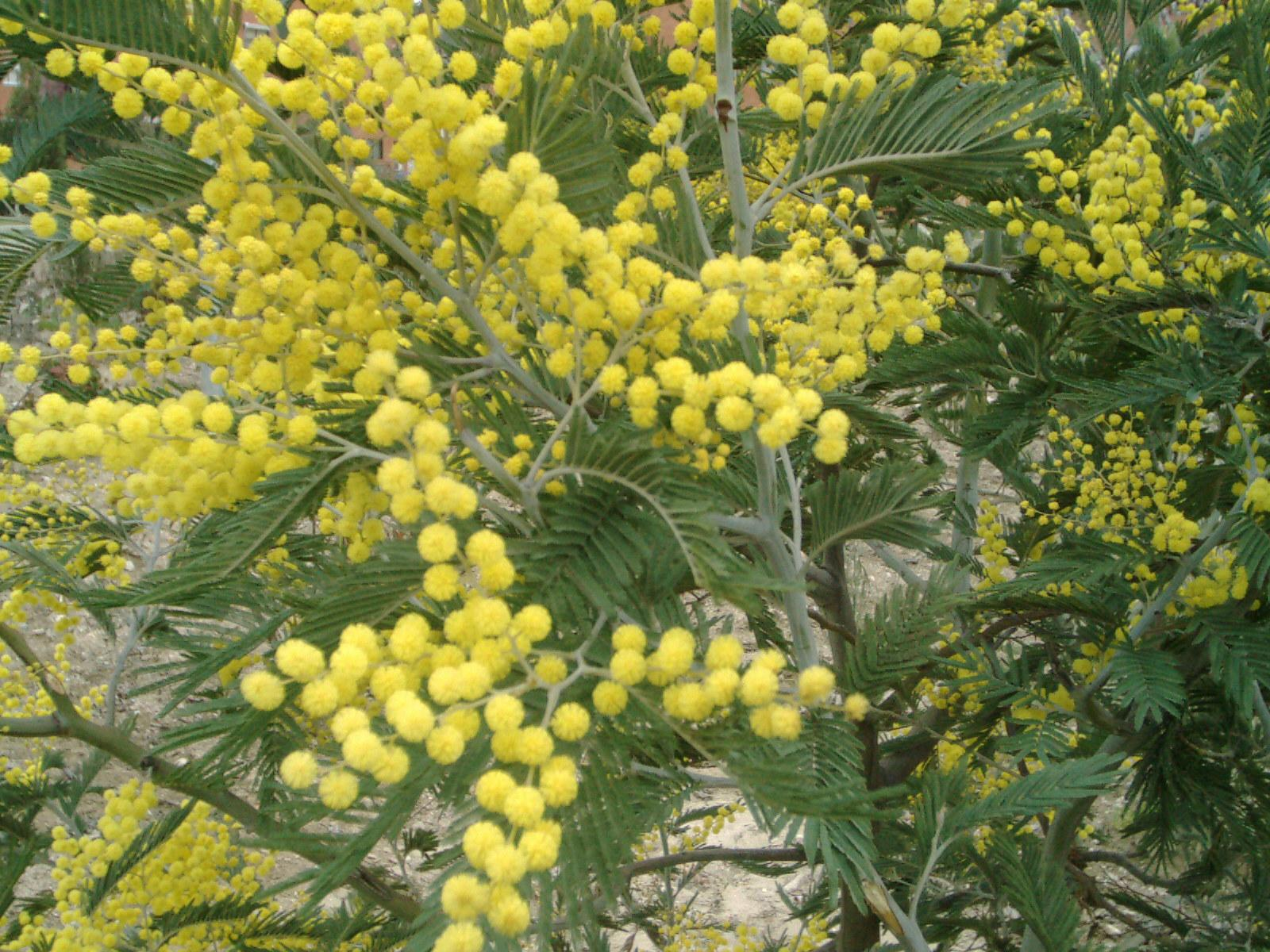
The "mimosa"
(Silver Wattle (Acacia dealbata])),
symbol of Women's day in Russia

== See also ==
- Eggs mimosa
- Egg salad
- Olivier salad
- Salade niçoise
- Dressed herring
- Tuna salad
- Zakuski
- List of salads
- List of Russian dishes
- List of fish dishes
