= Herring salad =

Mixed salad featuring salted herring

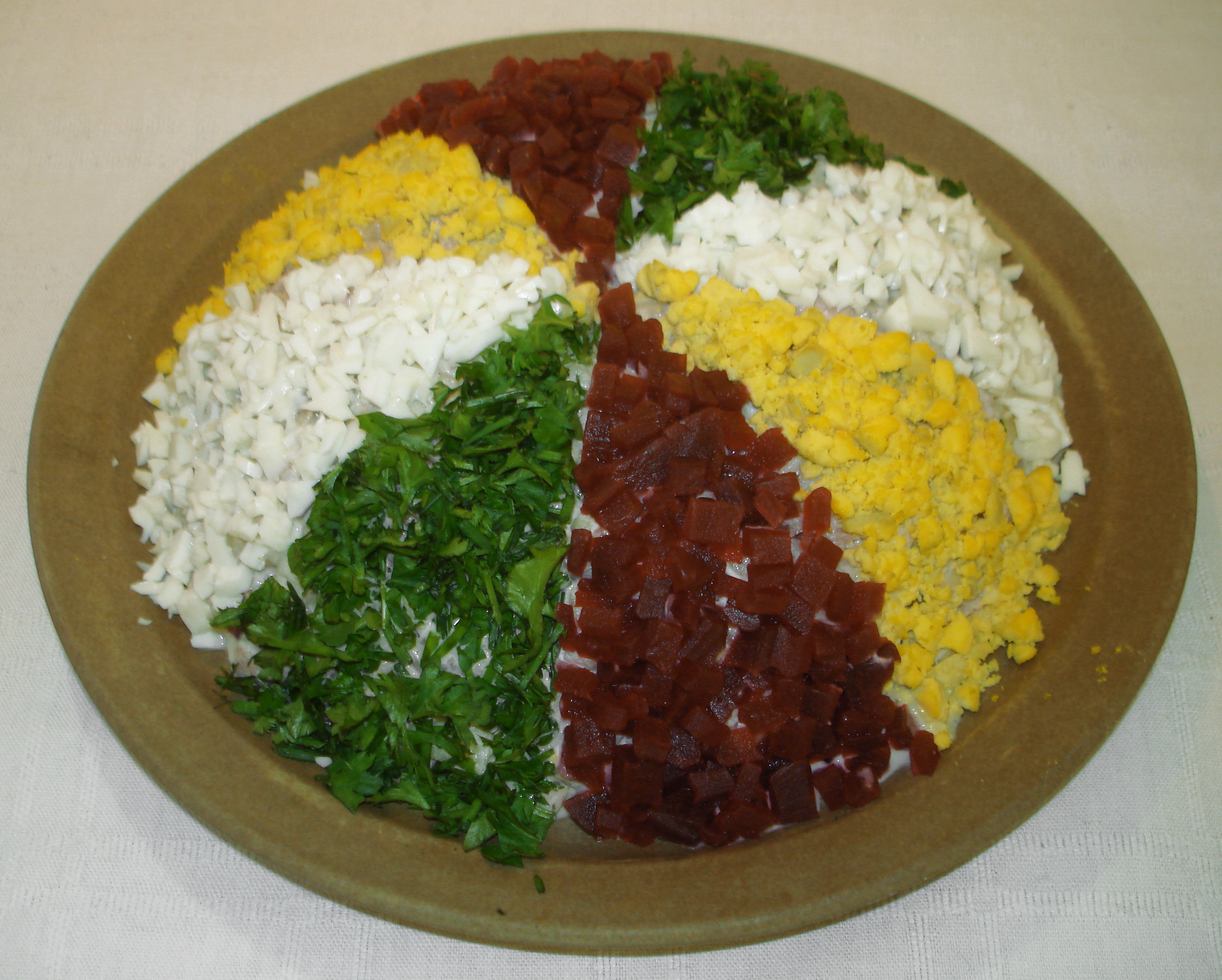
A plate of Norwegian herring salad

Herring salad (Finnish: sillisalaatti, Swedish: sillsallad, Norwegian: sildesalat) is a mixed salad consisting of cut and salted herring, beetroot, potato, onion, mayonnaise and sour cream.

== Ingredients, preparation, and history ==
Scandinavian herring salad is made of salted or pickled herring, cooked potatoes, and beetroot, cut into small cubes and served on a tray. It can also contain cucumber, apple, carrots, and onion. If the salad does not contain herring it is called beetroot salad. The salad can be eaten with a sauce made of sour cream and lemon juice or vinegar. Recipes often recommend refrigerating the salad overnight or for a few hours to set, before serving it chilled.

The Finnish name for herring salad, rosolli, comes from the Russian language. The original Russian word rassol meant a brine of pickled gherkins; the Estonian rosolje is a similar dish. The Swedish word sillsallad is thought to have inspired the word sinsalla which is used to refer to rosolli in Ostrobothnia. In the United States, herring salad prepared in this style is associated with Scandinavian immigrant communities in the upper midwest.

== See also ==
- Dressed herring
- Rosolli
- Beetroot
