= Forshmak =

Herring dish in Jewish cuisine

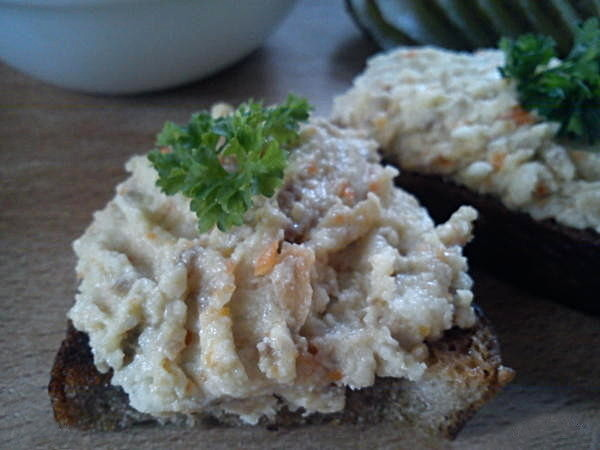
Traditional forshmak based on chopped herring

Forshmak (Yiddish: פֿאָרשמאַק, Russian: форшмак), or vorschmack, from German Vorgeschmack ("foretaste") or Vorspeise ("appetizer"), also known as chopped herring, is a traditional dish of Ashkenazi Jewish cuisine, particularly associated with the Jewish communities of Eastern Europe, including Poland, Lithuania, Ukraine, and Russia. It is a savory appetizer made primarily from chopped salted herring, hard-boiled eggs, onions, apples or potatoes, and bread or soaked matzah, often seasoned with vinegar or oil. The dish is typically served cold, often spread on rye bread or crackers.

In a cross-cultural transformation, forshmak was the only Jewish dish to have been assimilated into Soviet cuisine. It remains a popular component of the Russian zakuski tables on holidays and in social gatherings, where it is typically served with shots of vodka.

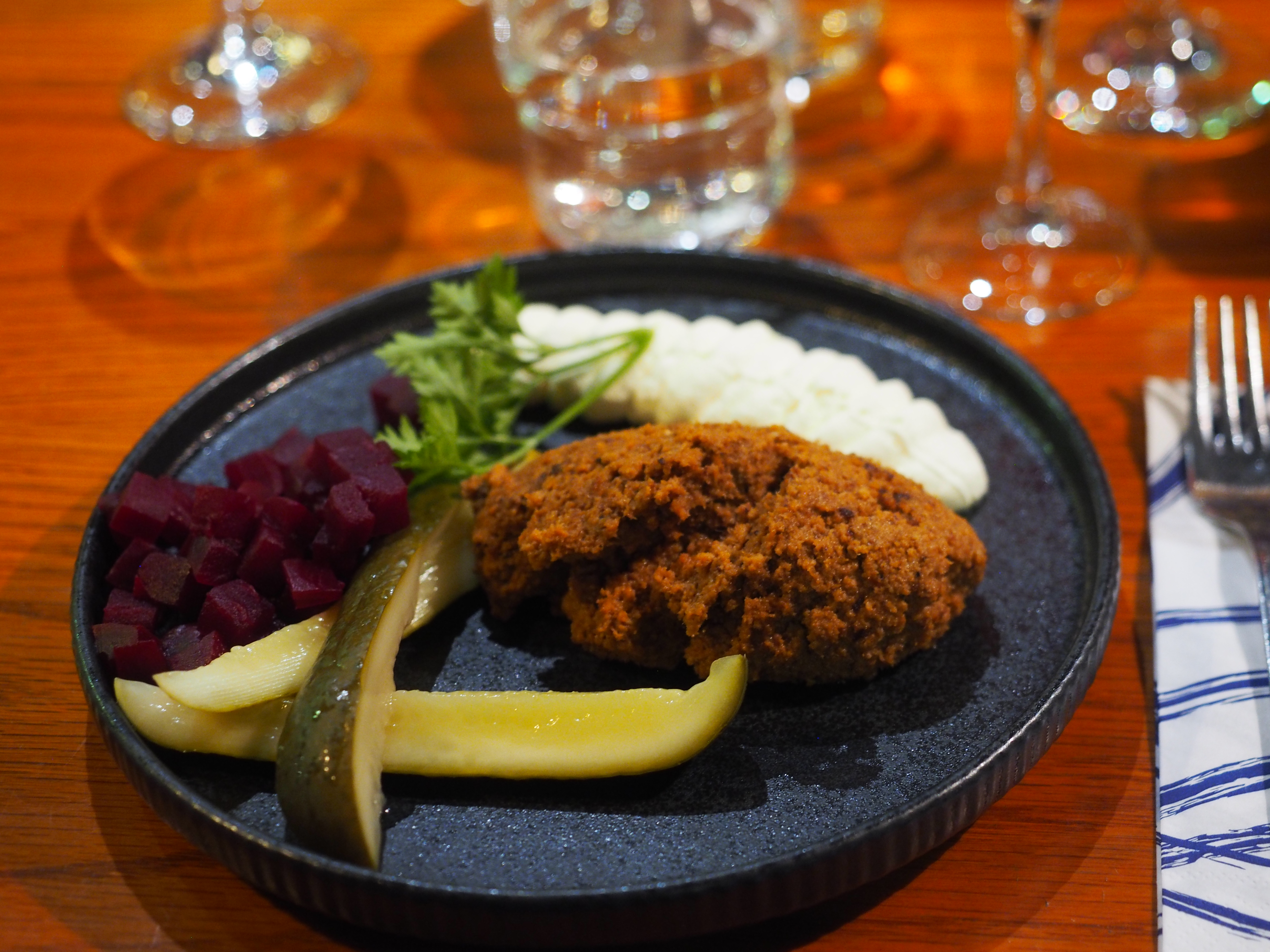
Finnish vorschmack with sour cream, pickled cucumber, and beets

According to Jewish dietary laws, the herring-based forshmak is a pareve (neutral) dish and can be consumed by observant Jews in meals that serve dairy or meat. Beef or veal variations containing both ground meat and ground fish (herring or sprats) originated in Prussia and are especially popular in Finland, where they are called vorschmack. Finns consider vorschmack a national dish because it was the favorite appetizer of their national hero, Marshal Mannerheim, the commander-in-chief of the Finnish army in the 1939-1940 war against the Soviet Union and subsequently Finland's president. Mannerheim may have brought vorschmack to Finland from his long and distinguished service in the Russian Imperial Army between 1891 and 1917. From Kashrut considerations, the meat-based vorschmack cannot be consumed by observant Jews in meals that serve dairy dishes.

== Ingredients ==
Jewish-Russian forshmak includes herring fillets, which may be skinned and soaked to reduce salinity, onion, bread soaked in water or milk, vinegar or lemon juice, vegetable oil, hard boiled eggs, and tart apples. Finnish vorschmack includes pickled herring or anchovy fillets, onion, garlic, cognac, red wine vinegar, tomato puree, water, and either beef, veal or lamb.
