= Dressed herring =

Soviet layered salad

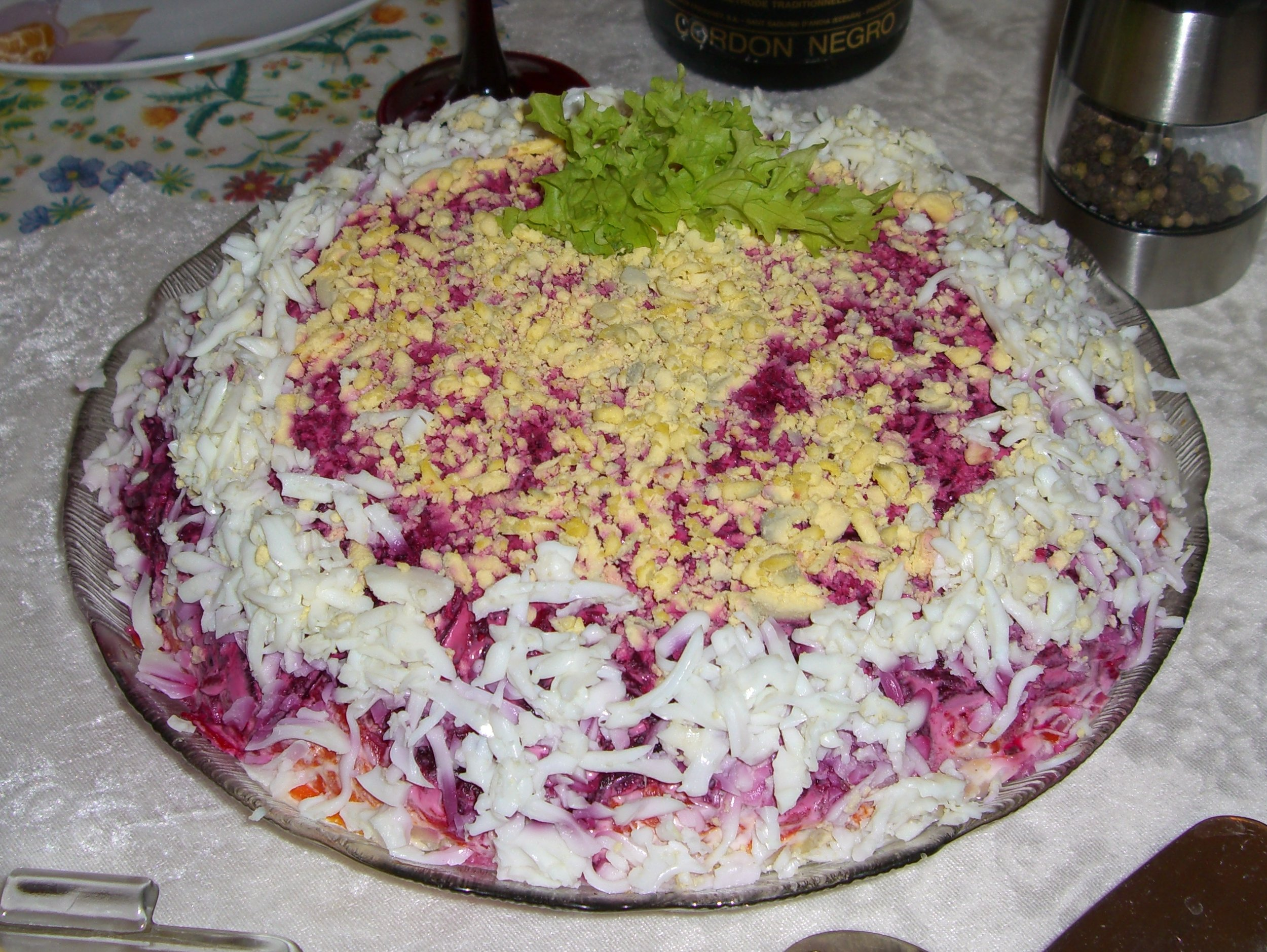
- Alternative names: Herring under a fur coat
- Type: Salad
- Place of origin: USSR
- Associated cuisine: Belarusian, Latvian, Lithuanian, Polish, Russian, Ukrainian, Moldovan
- Main ingredients: Herring, vegetables (potatoes, carrots, beetroots), onions, mayonnaise

Dressed herring, colloquially known as shuba, herring under a fur coat, or furry herring (Russian: "сельдь под шубой", romanized: "sel'd pod shuboy" or "селёдка под шубой", "selyodka pod shuboy"), is a layered salad composed of diced spekesild covered with layers of grated boiled eggs, vegetables (potatoes, carrots, beetroots), chopped onions, and mayonnaise. Some variations of this dish include a layer of fresh grated apple while some do not.

A final layer of grated boiled beetroot covered with mayonnaise is what gives the salad its characteristic rich purple color. Dressed herring salad is often decorated with grated boiled eggs (whites, yolks, or both).

Dressed herring salad is popular in Russia, Belarus (Belarusian: Селядзец пад футрам, romanized: Sieliadziec pad futram) and other countries such as Poland, Lithuania and Latvia, (Lithuanian: Silkė pataluose, Latvian: Siļķe kažokā). It is especially popular for holidays, and is commonly served as a "zakuska" at New Year (Novy God) and Christmas celebrations in Belarus, Ukraine, Russia, Kazakhstan, Kyrgyzstan and the United States.

In Poland, the dish is known as “śledź pod pierzynką” (pol. herring underneath feather duvet) .

== See also ==
- Herring salad
- Olivier salad
- Salade niçoise
- Mimosa salad
  - Eggs mimosa
- Egg salad
- Zakuski
- List of salads
- List of Russian dishes
- List of fish dishes
