= Zakuski =

Russian term for appetizers served before meals

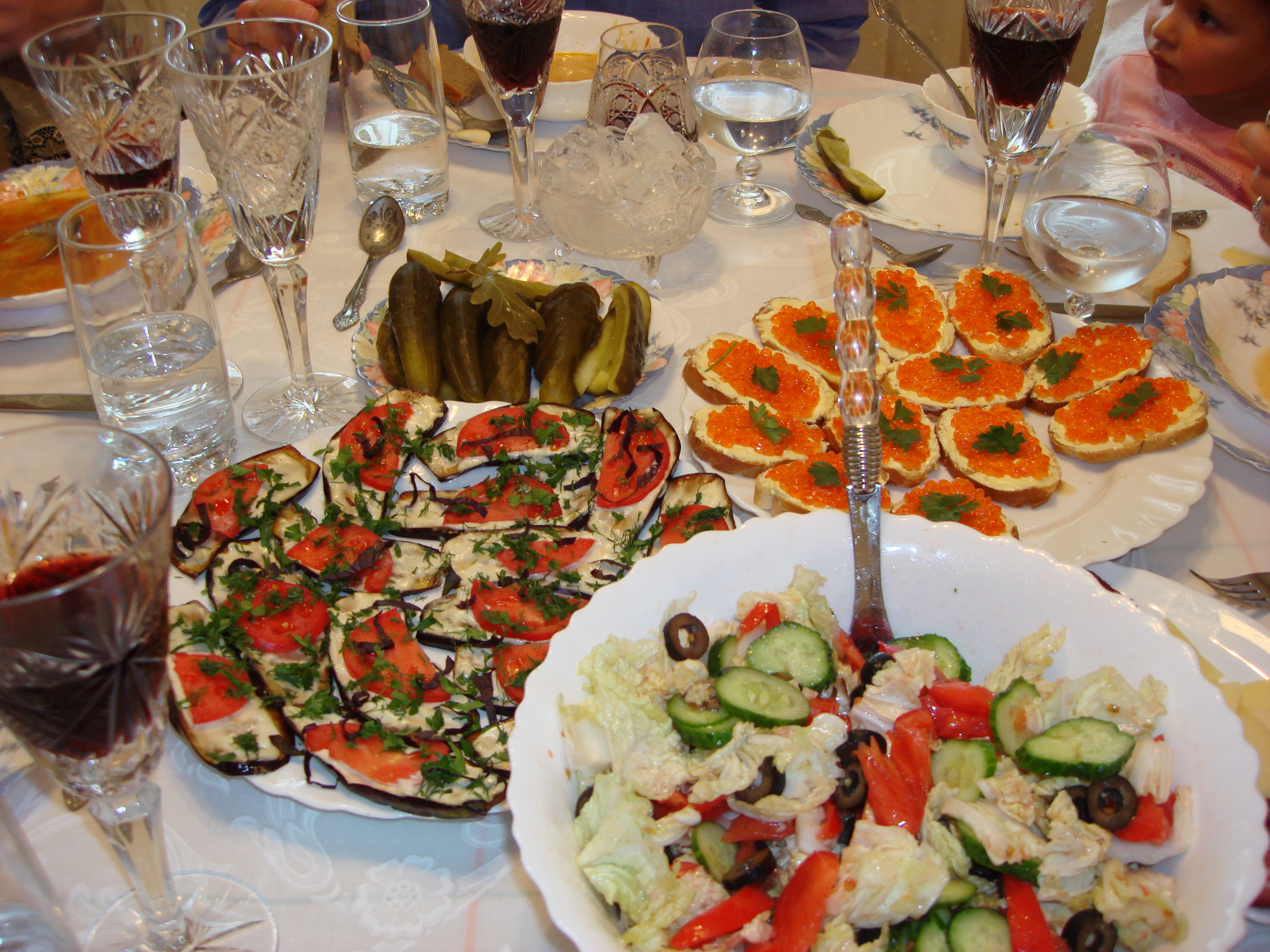
- Course: Hors d'oeuvre or snack
- Associated cuisine: Russian
- Main ingredients: Cold cuts, cured fishes, mixed salads, pickled vegetables, kholodets, pirozhki, hard cheeses, caviar, roe, canapés, open sandwiches, breads

Zakuski (Russian: закуски, [zɐˈkuskʲɪ]; sing. закуска, zakuska) is the term for an assortment of cold hors d'oeuvres, entrées and snacks in Russian food culture. They are considered to be an integral part of any Russian festive meal, as well as often everyday meals.

== Terminology ==
Originally, the term referred to pies and other sweet delicacies served after a main meal, but now can refer to a light meal before a main meal or a snack, which may also be eaten at a stand-up bar known as zakusochnaya. It is served as a course on its own or "intended to follow each shot of vodka or another alcoholic drink". The word literally means 'little bites'.

== History ==
The tradition of zakuski is linked to the Swedish and Finnish brännvinsbord, which was also the ancestor of modern smörgåsbord, and to meze of the Ottoman Empire and other Middle Eastern cultures. Its origin is generally attributed to Peter I of Russia (r. 1682–1725), who absorbed many foreign customs during his travels to Western Europe.

Zakuski are not served as in Scandinavia at the buffet, but instead at the dining table. Zakuski are also a food-in-itself and often not just served as starter to a meal. They were kept in the houses of the Russian gentry for feeding casual visitors who travelled long distances and whose arrival time was often unpredictable. At banquets and parties, zakuski were often served in a separate room adjacent to the dining room, or on a separate table in the dining room. The tradition eventually spread to other layers of society and remained in the Soviet times, but due to lack of space, they were served on the dinner table. Zakuski became thus the first course of a festive dinner.

Nowadays, these appetizers are commonly served at banquets, dinners, parties and receptions in countries which were formerly part of the Russian Empire, including some post-Soviet states and Poland. A broad selection of zakuski constitutes a standard first course at any feast table. Usually, zakuski are already laid on the table when guests are called to the dining room.

Zakuski can be cold or hot.

Typical cold zakuski selections may include cold cuts, cured fishes, mixed salads, kholodets (meat jelly), pirogs or pirozhki, various pickled vegetables such as beets, cucumbers, sauerkraut, pickled mushrooms, deviled eggs, hard cheeses, caviar, canapés, open sandwiches, and breads.

== Gallery ==
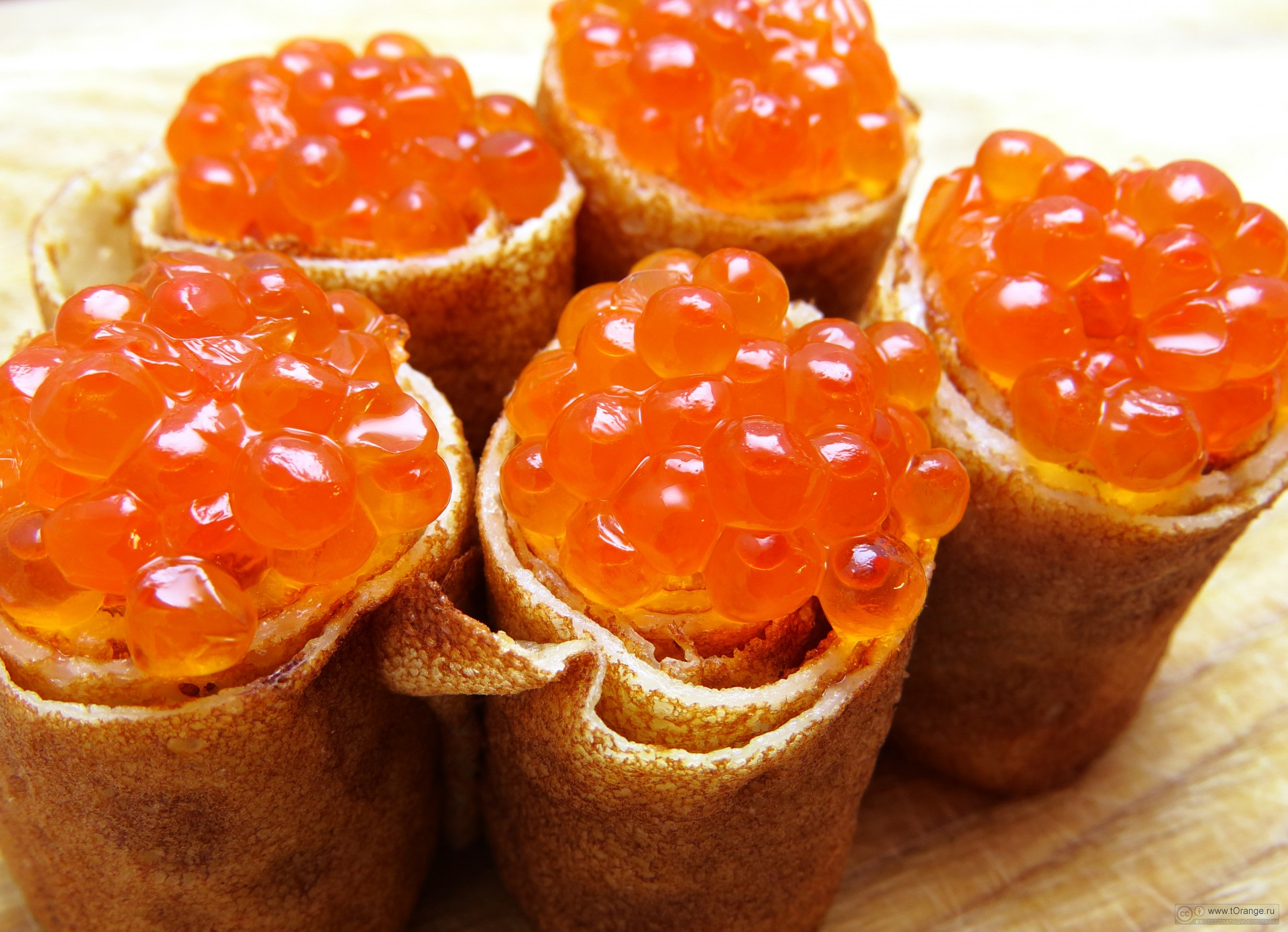
Blini with red caviar

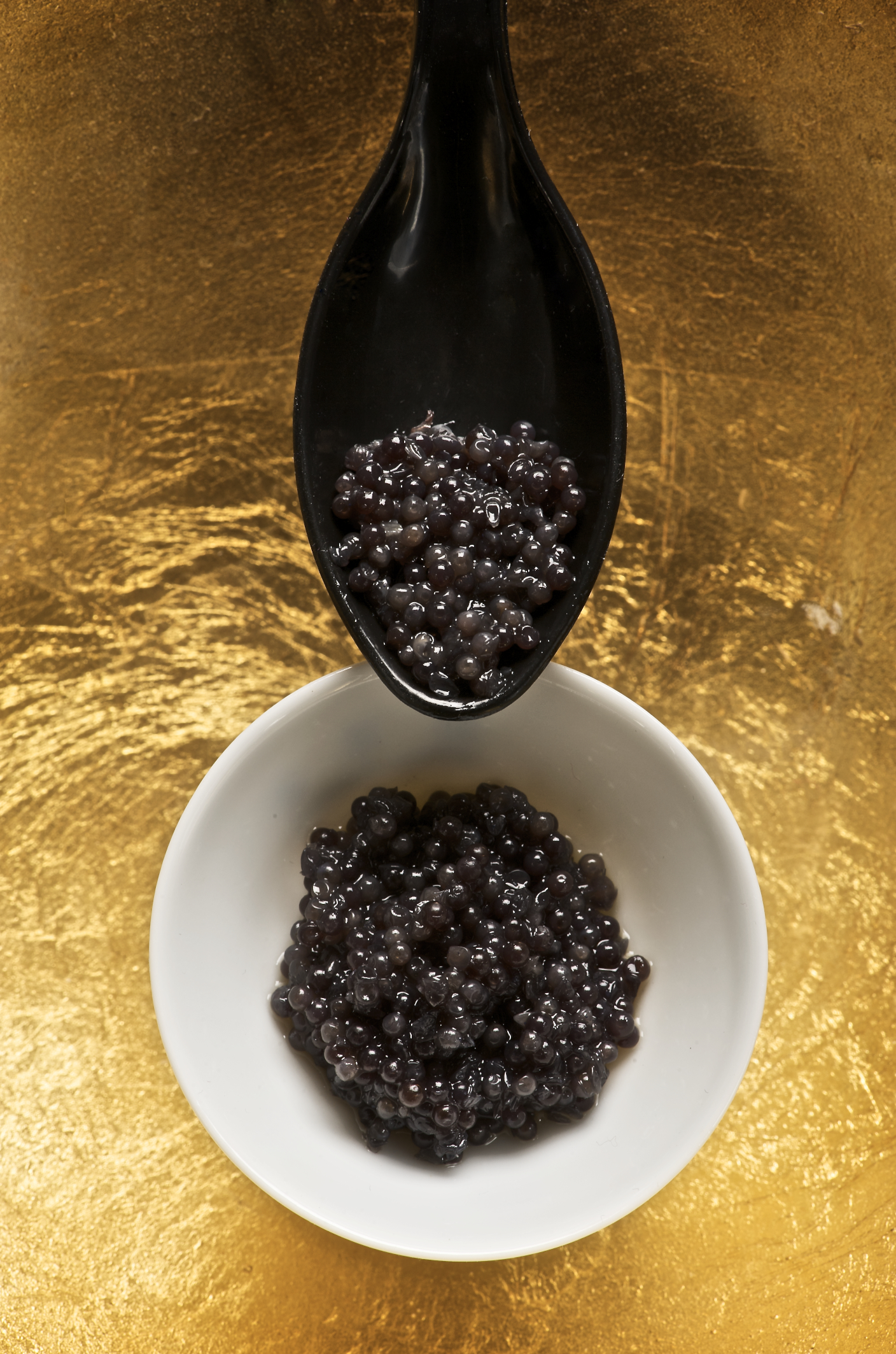
Black caviar

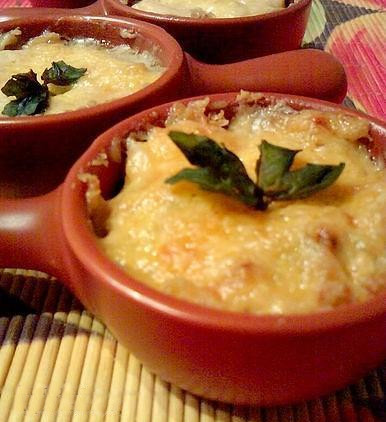
Julienne (dish) named after Julienning technique

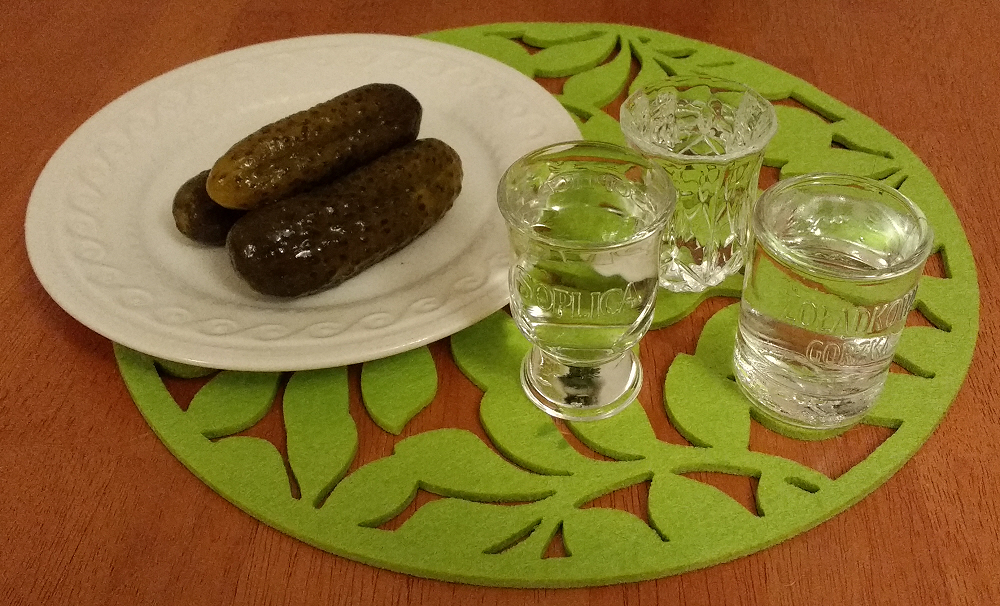
Pickled cucumbers with clear vodka

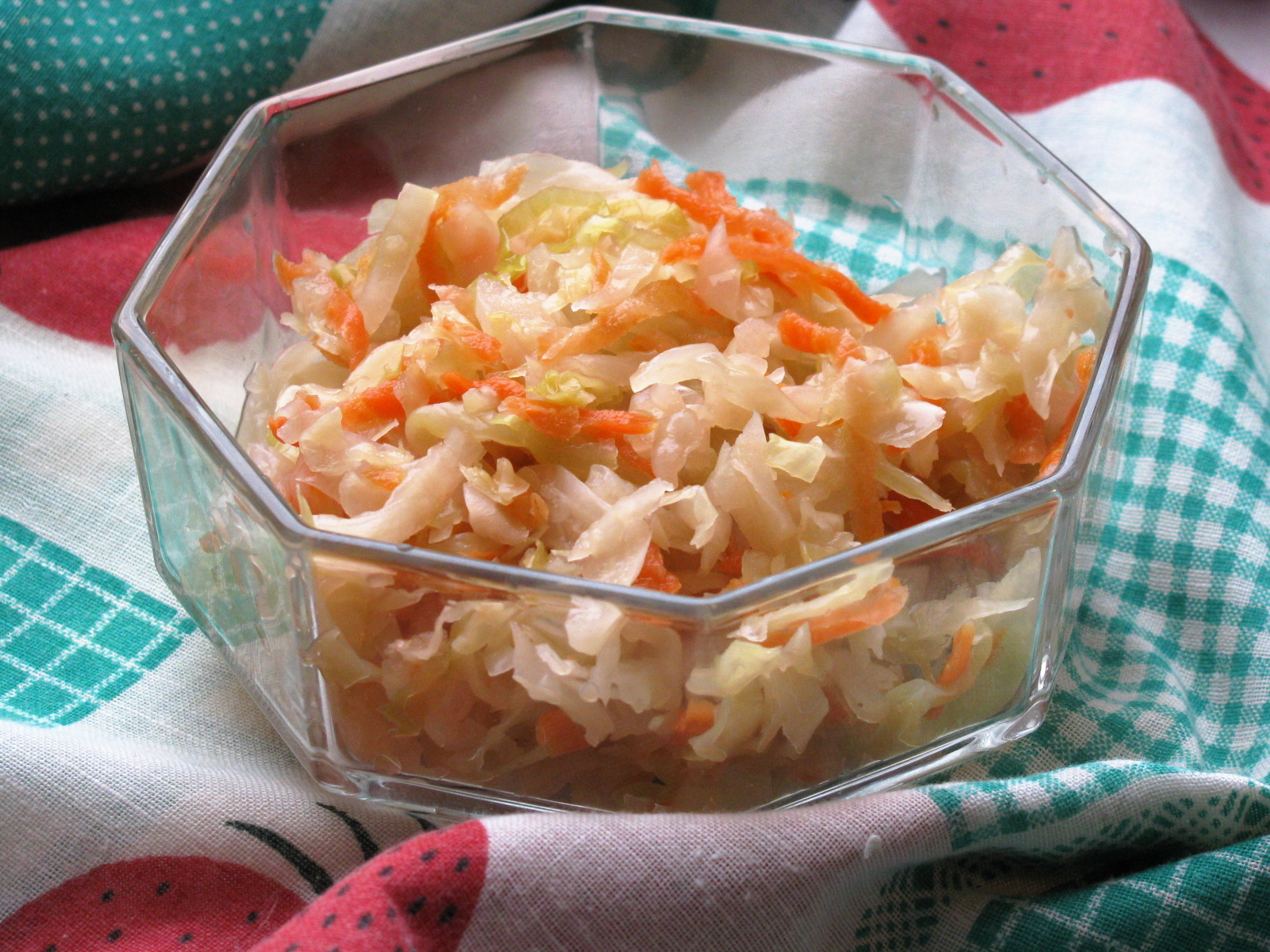
Sauerkraut

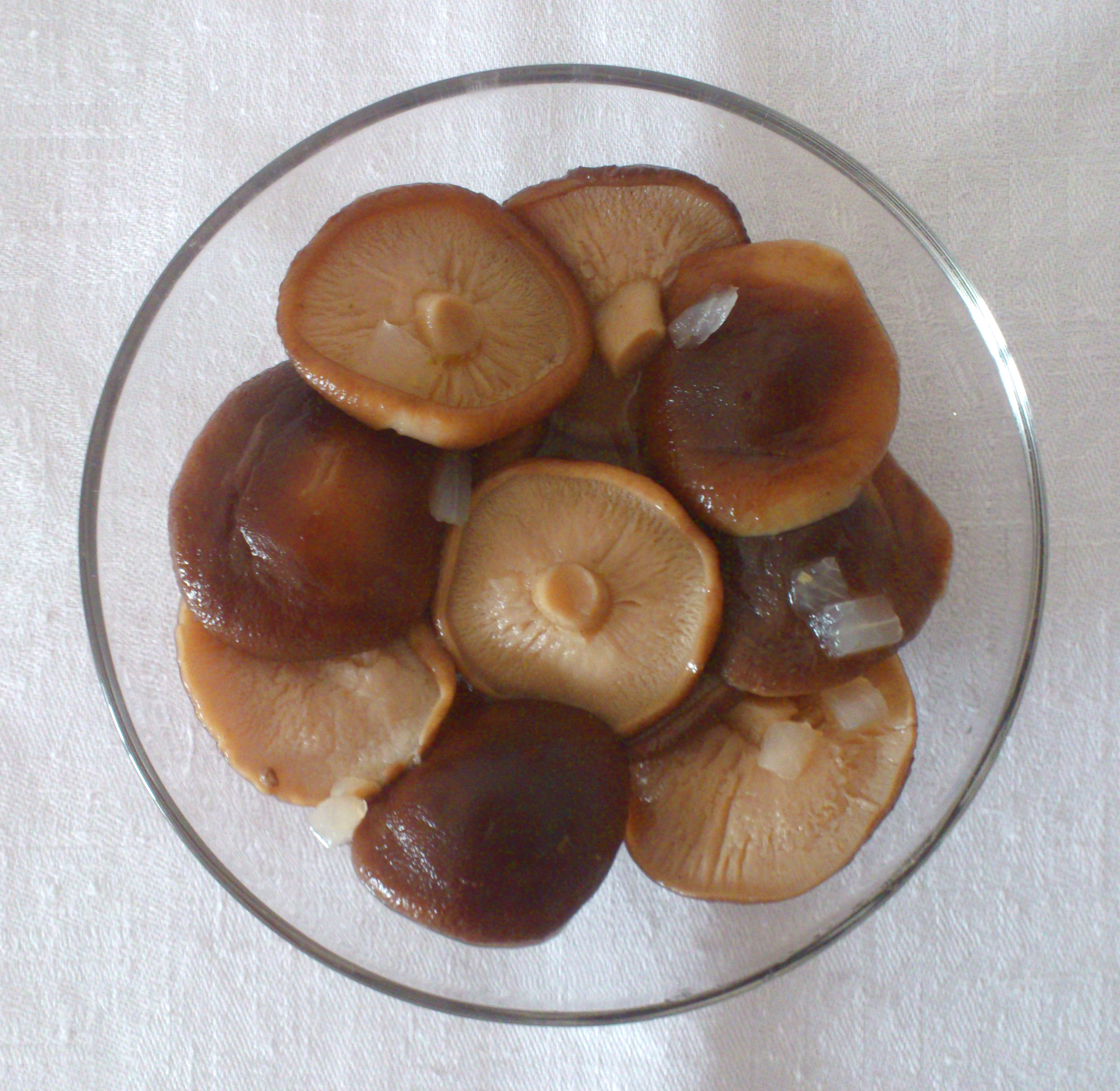
Pickled mushrooms

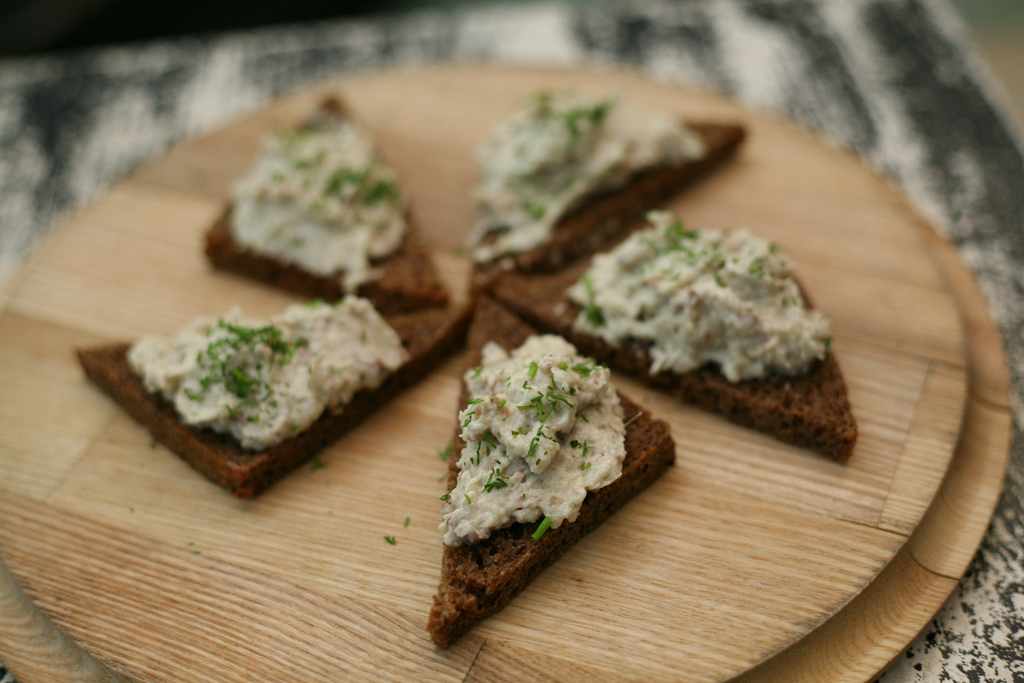
Forshmak

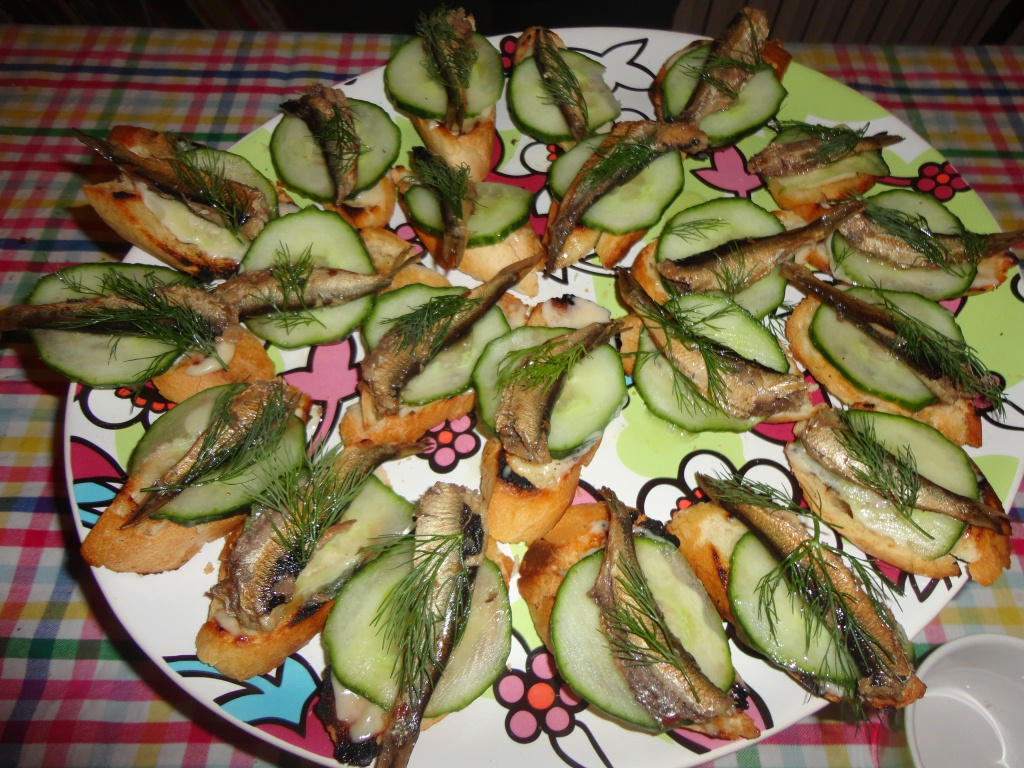
Canapés with sprats

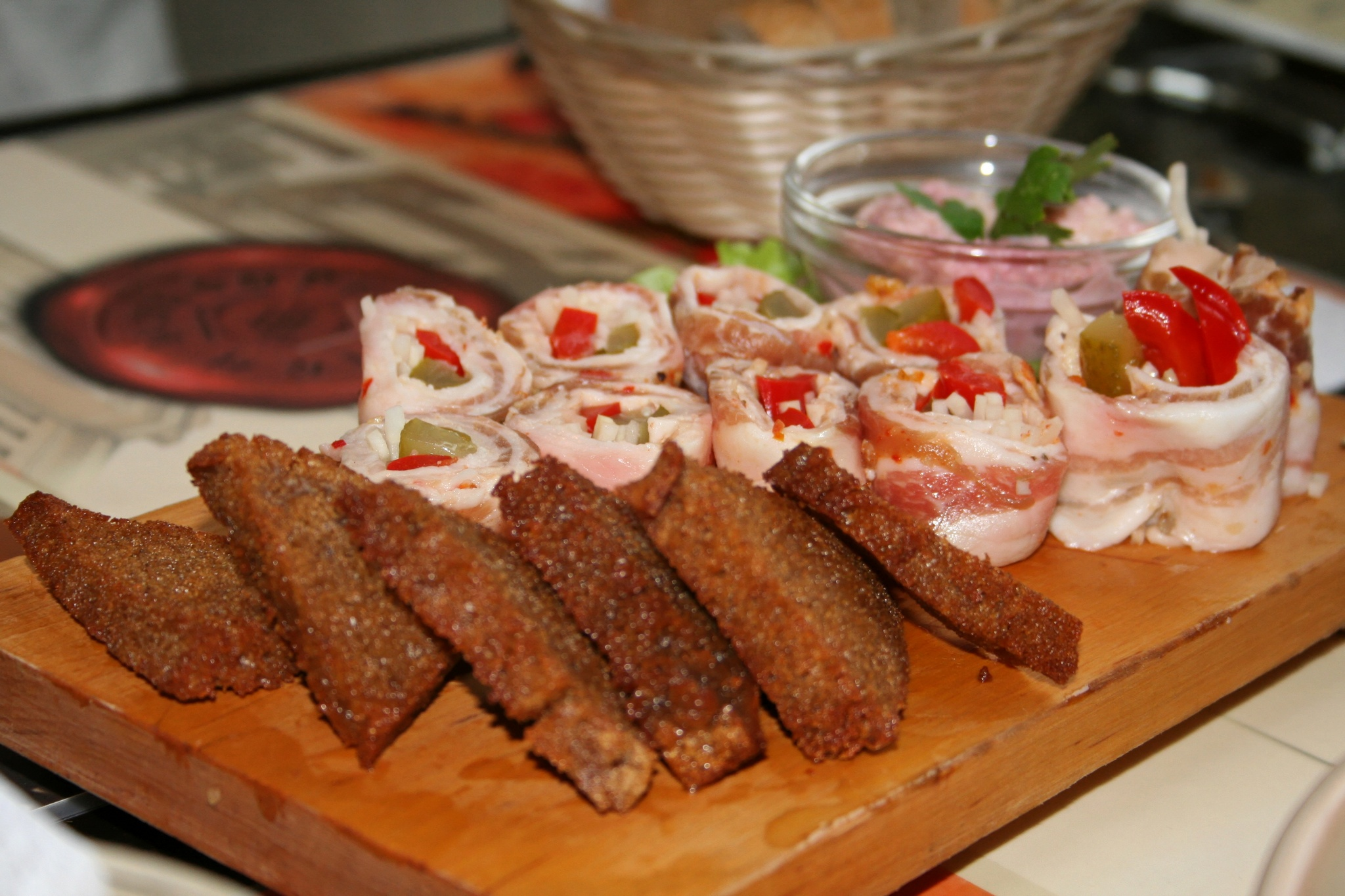
Breads with salo

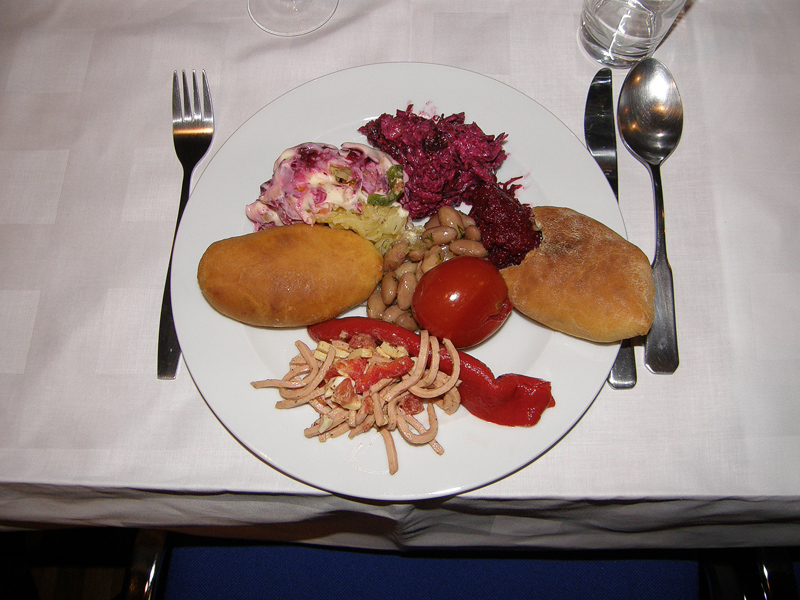
Pirozhki, pickled tomato, mixed salads

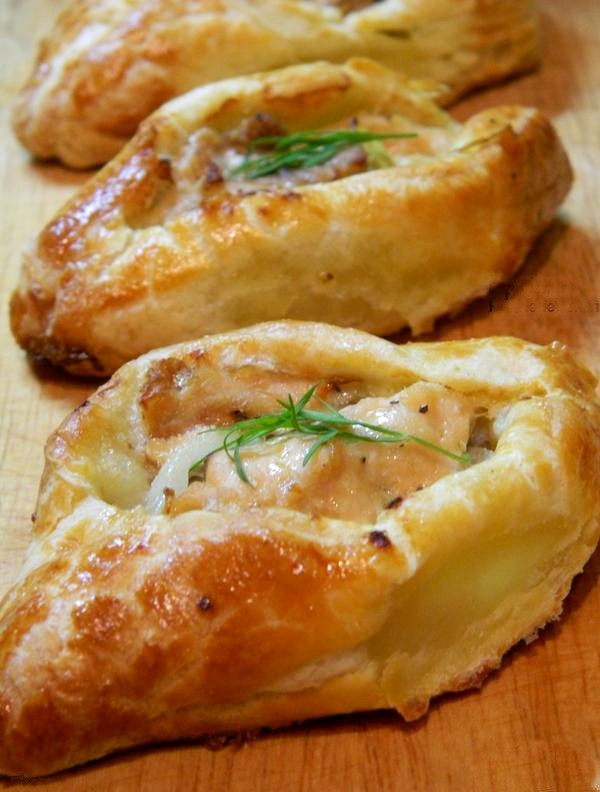
Rasstegai

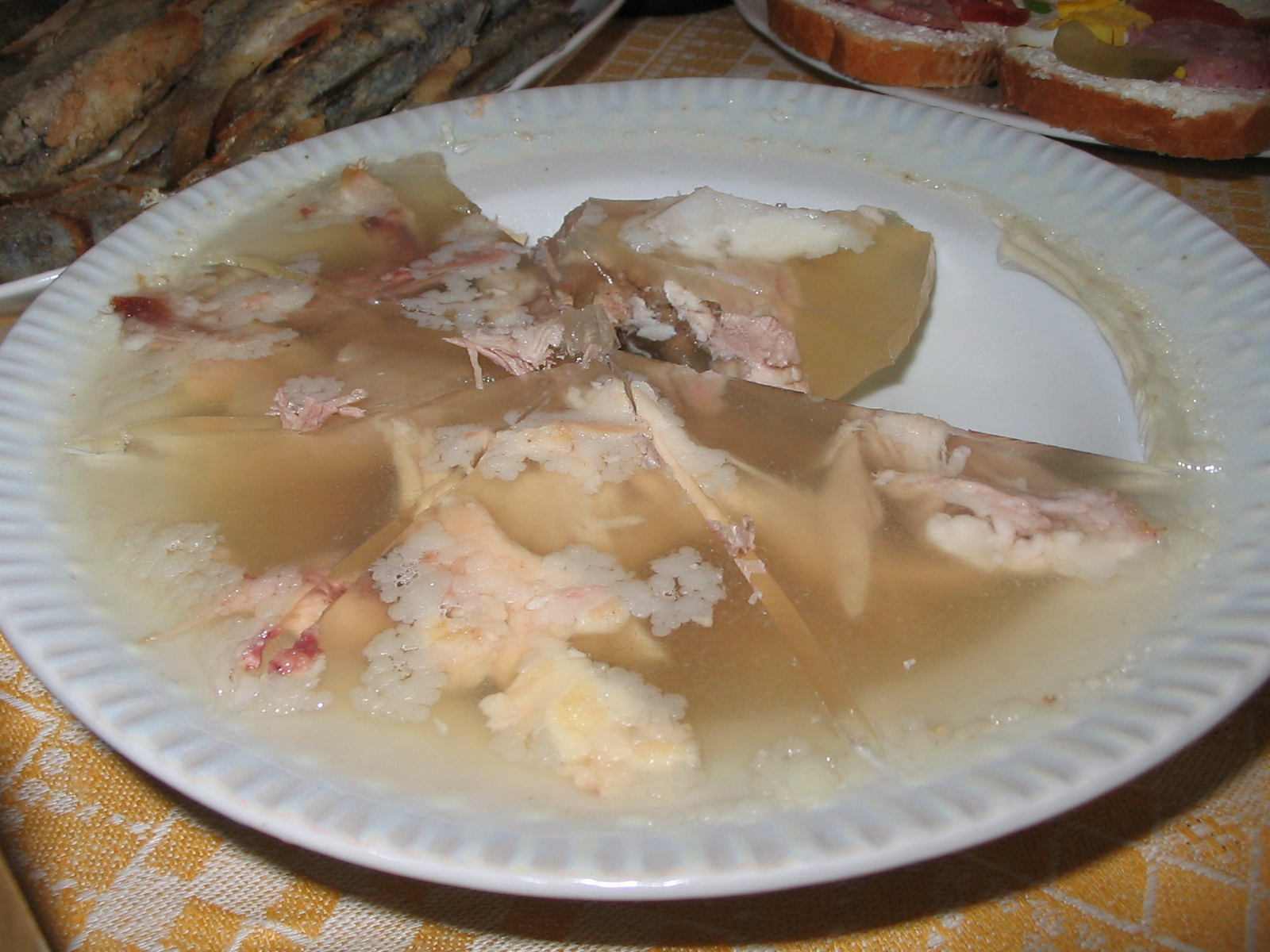
Kholodets

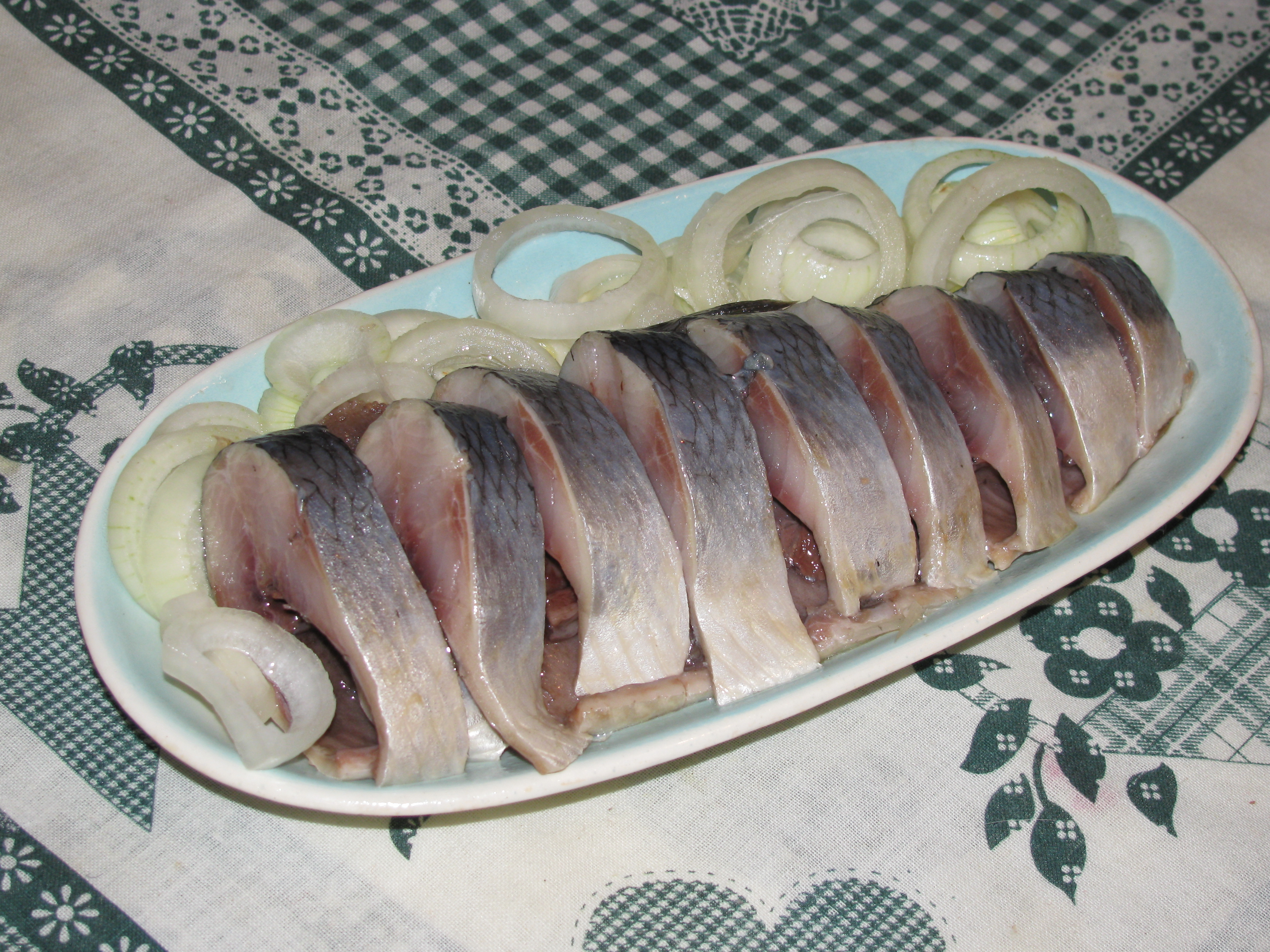
Brined or pickled herring

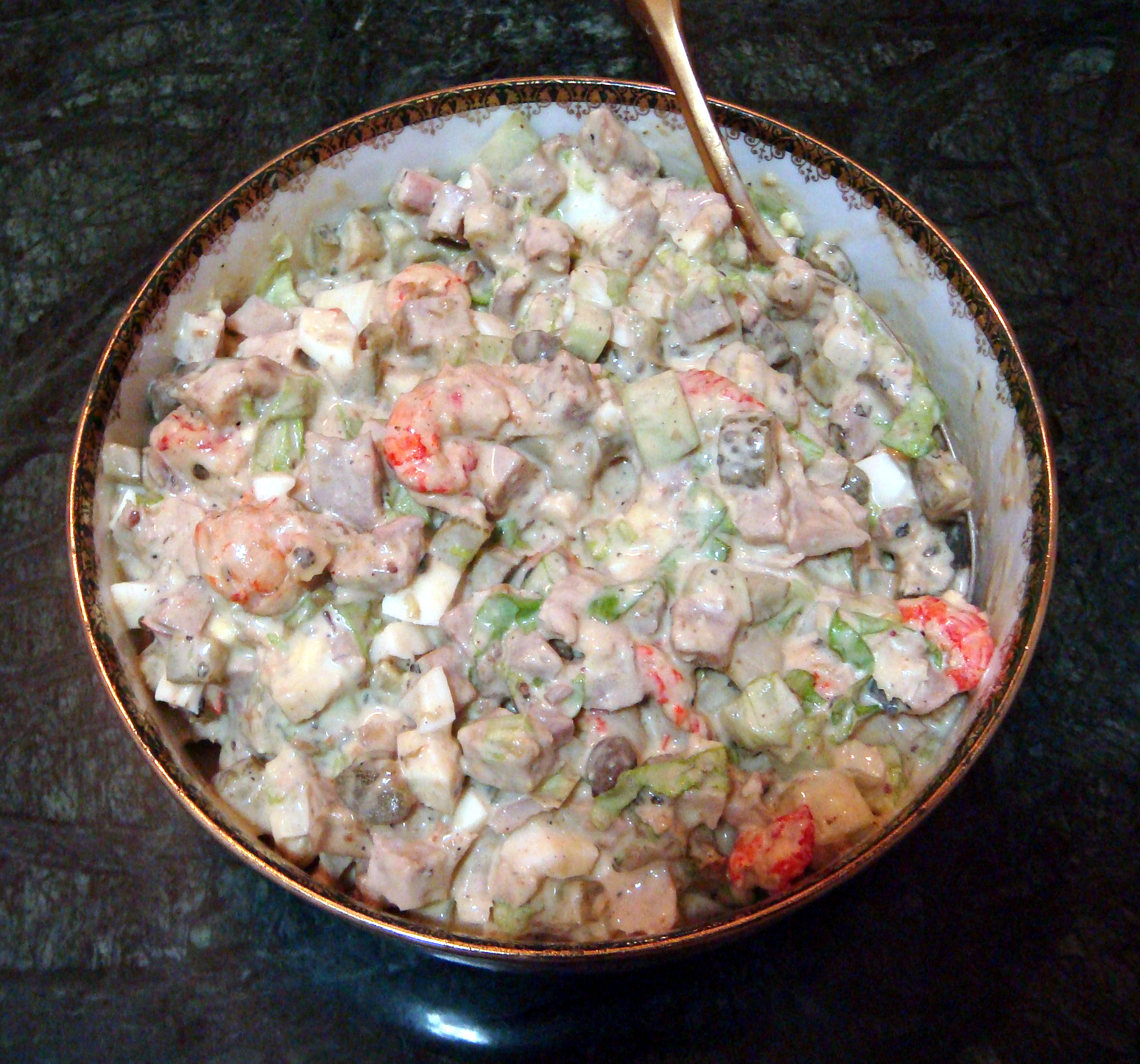
Olivier salad

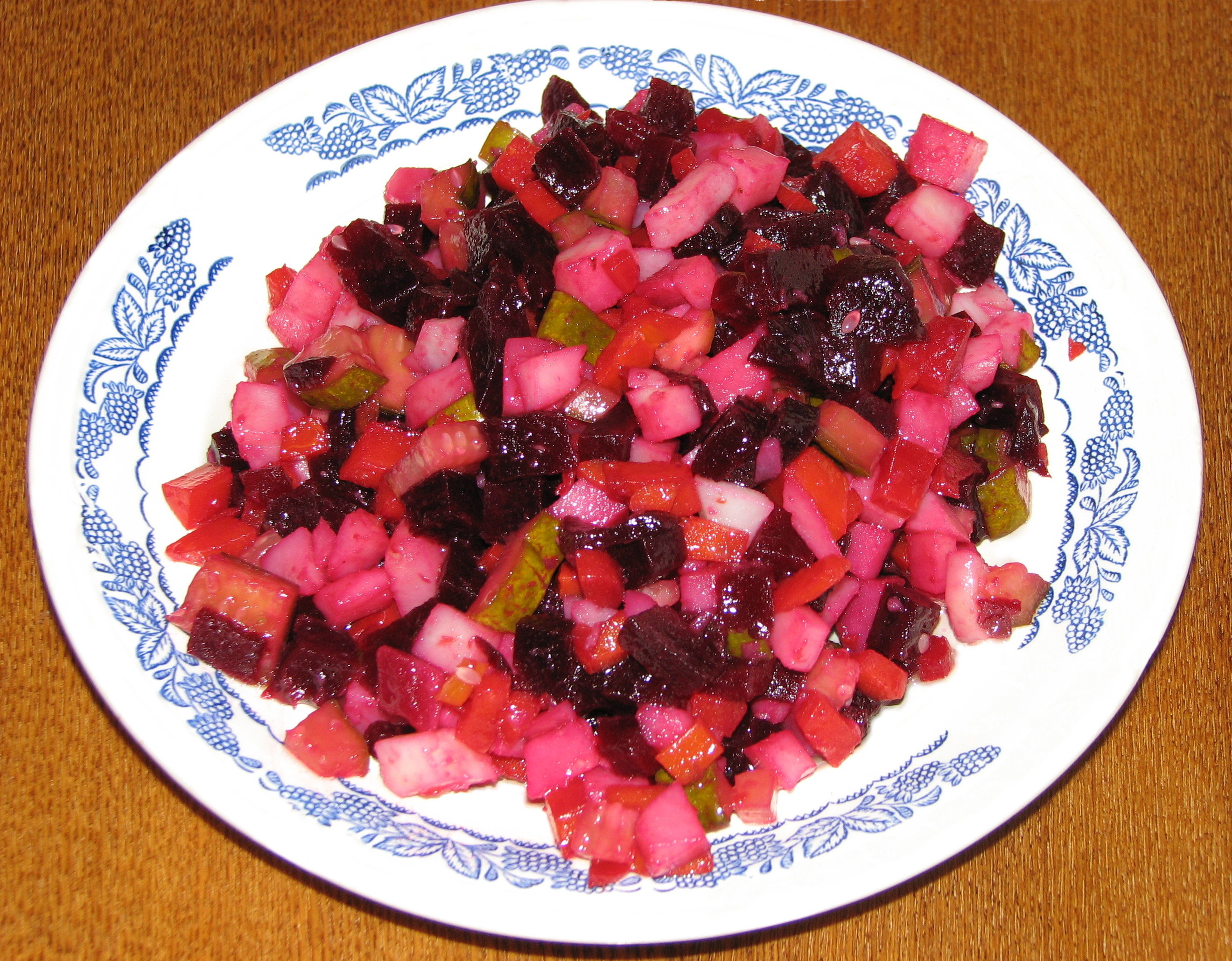
Vinegret

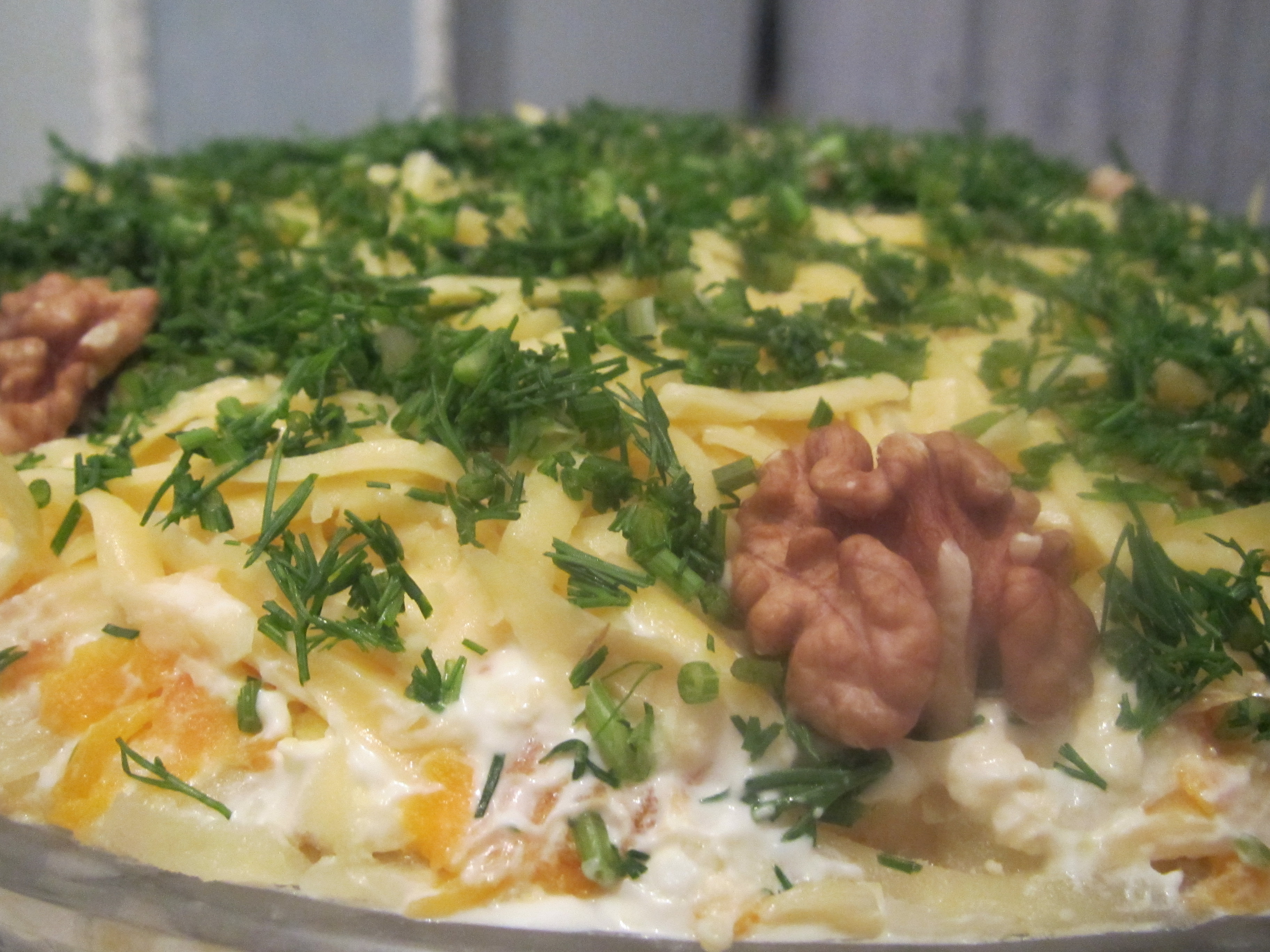
Mimosa salad

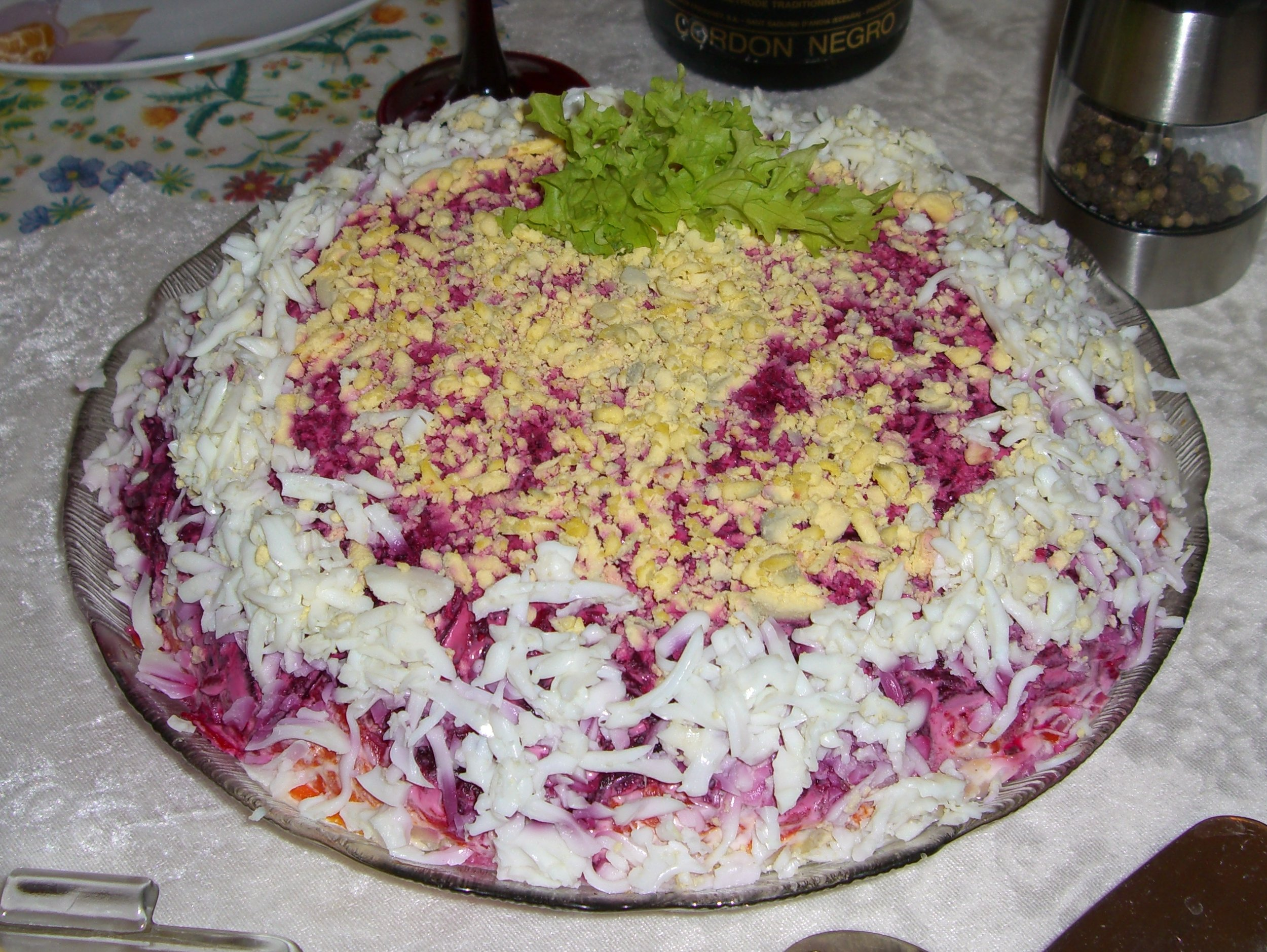
Dressed herring

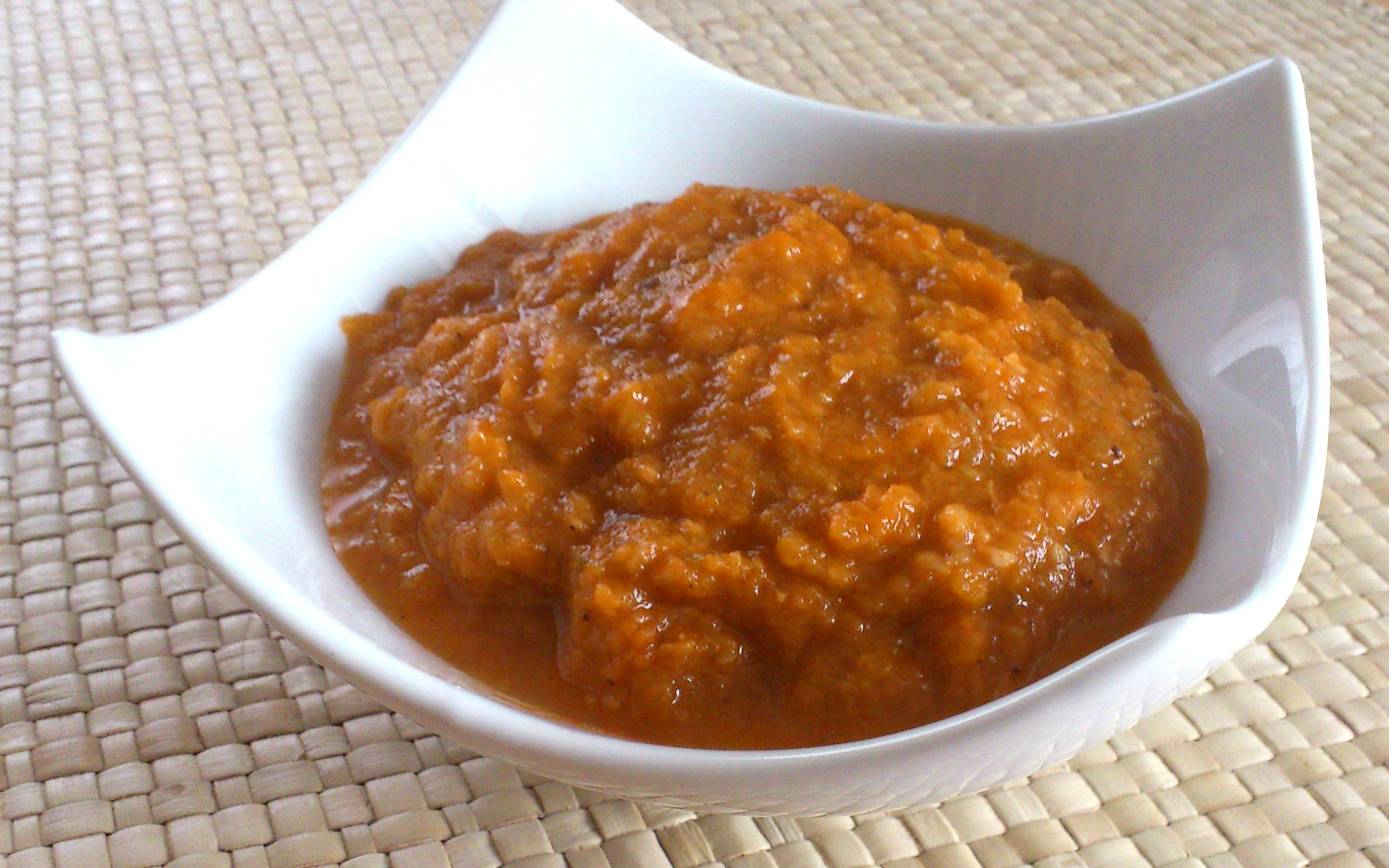
Zucchini caviar

== See also ==
- List of hors d'oeuvre
- List of Russian dishes
- Anju (food) – Korean term for food eaten with alcohol
- Antipasto – First course of a formal Italian meal
- Cicchetti (food) – Small snacks or side dishes in Venetian cuisine
- Kap klaem – Thai term for food consumed with alcohol
- Meze – Small dish in Middle Eastern and Balkan cuisines
- Pu pu platter – Tray of American Chinese cuisine
- Pusas – Traditional appetiser or snack eaten with alcohol in Sabah, Malaysia
- Sakana – Japanese snacks, eaten with alcohol
- Tapas – Appetiser or snack in Spanish and international cuisine
