= Cassolette =

Container for cooking and serving individual dishes

A cassolette (probably a diminutive form of the French word cassole, "small container") is a small porcelain, glass, or metal oven-proof container used for the cooking and serving of individual dishes. Cossolette might have lugs or a short handle (French: cassolette à manche). The word also refers to dishes served in such a container:

- Cassolettes ambassadrice: A ragoût of chicken livers with a duchesse potato border
- Cassolettes bouquetière: Creamed vegetables topped with asparagus tips and cauliflower florets
- Cassolettes marquise: Crayfish tails à la Nantua to which diced truffles and mushrooms have been added, with a border of puff pastry
- Cassolettes régence: a salpicon of chicken breast and truffles in a velouté sauce, topped with asparagus tips with a border of duchesse potatoes

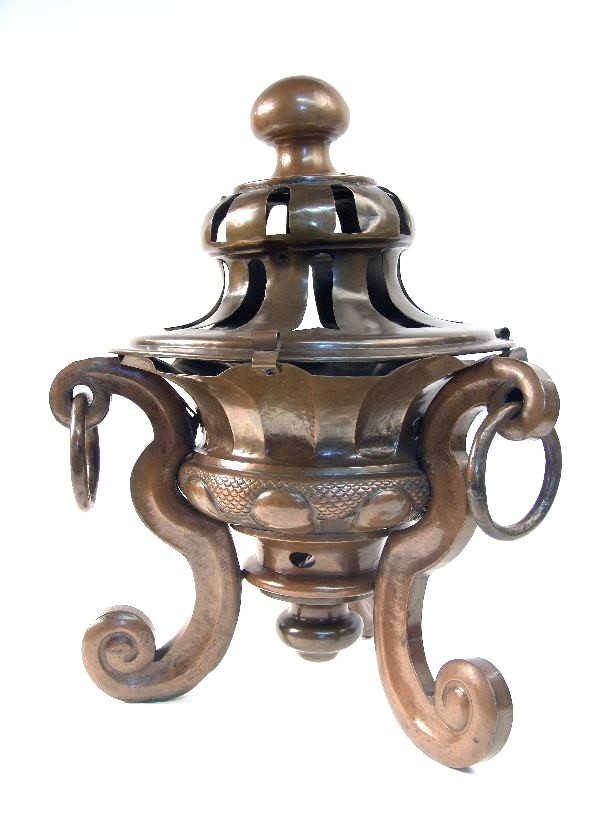
Vase-shaped cassolette incense burner

The culinary meaning of the word dates back to the early 19th century. Prior to that (from the 16th century), the same word was used for a vessel to burn incense, or otherwise emit the perfume.

The latter meaning extended to a small pendant with perfumes. Alex Comfort used the term cassolette in The Joy of Sex (1972) for a woman's natural body scent. French dictionaries also record ironic uses for unpleasant odors. A later academic review of human olfaction describes Comfort's use of a woman's "cassolette", glossing the word as "perfume box".

== See also ==
- Casserole
- Cassoulet
- List of cooking vessels

== Sources ==
- Académie française (2024). "Cassolette". Dictionnaire de l'Académie française (in French) (9th ed.).
- Centre national de ressources textuelles et lexicales. "Cassolette". Trésor de la langue française informatisé (in French). CNRTL.
- "Cassolette". New Larousse Gastronomique. London: Hamlyn. 2018. p. PT524. ISBN 978-0-600-63587-1.
- Levine, John M.; McBurney, Donald H. (1986). "The Role of Olfaction in Social Perception and Behavior". In Herman, C. Peter; Zanna, Mark P.; Higgins, E. Tory (eds.). Physical Appearance, Stigma, and Social Behavior. The Ontario Symposium. Vol. 3. Hillsdale, New Jersey: Lawrence Erlbaum Associates. pp. 179–217. ISBN 0-89859-638-6.
- Morton, Mark (2004). "casserole". Cupboard Love: A Dictionary of Culinary Curiosities (2nd revised ed.). Toronto: Insomniac Press. p. 69. ISBN 978-1-894663-66-3.
- Weerakoon, Patricia (2009). "The New Joy of Sex". Sexual Health. 6 (1): 98–99. doi:10.1071/SHv6n1_BR1.
