= List of Russian dishes =

This is a list of notable dishes found in Russian cuisine. Russian cuisine is a collection of the different cooking traditions of the Russian Empire. The cuisine is diverse, with Northeast European/Baltic, Caucasian, Central Asian, Siberian, East Asian and Middle Eastern influences. Russian cuisine derives its varied character from the vast and multi-ethnic expanse of Russia.

== Russian dishes ==
=== Zakuski (Appetizers) ===
Name	Image	Description
Caviar		Known as ikra. Processed, salted roe, often of sturgeon
Courgette caviar		Cold entrée made of stewed vegetables (predominantly courgettes). Usually it is eaten with bread
Julienne		Мushrooms in cream or béchamel sauce topped with grated cheese and baked in a cocotte. Chicken, fish or seafood can also be used with or instead of mushrooms.
Kholodets		An aspic that is also known as studen
Salo		A dish consisting of cured slabs of fatback with or without skin
Stroganina		A dish of the indigenous people of northern Arctic Siberia consisting of raw, thin, long-sliced frozen fish.
Zakuski		Refers to a variety of hors d'oeuvres, snacks, appetizers, usually served buffet style. It often includes cold cuts, cured fishes, mixed salads, kholodets, various pickled vegetables and mushrooms, pirozhki, caviar, deviled eggs, open sandwiches, canapés and breads.

=== Soups ===
Name	Image	Description
Okroshka		Cold soup of mostly raw vegetables like cucumbers, spring onions, boiled potatoes, with eggs, and a cooked meat such as beef, veal, sausages, or ham with kvass, topped with sour cream
Rassolnik		A soup made from pickled cucumbers, pearl barley, and pork or beef kidneys
Shchi		A cabbage soup. Also can be based on sauerkraut. Kislye Shchi (sour shchi) despite its name is a fizzy beverage similar to kvass, usually with honey.
Borscht		It is traditionally made from meat or bone stock, sautéed vegetables, and beet sour (i.e., fermented beetroot juice). Depending on the recipe, some of these components may be omitted or substituted.
Svekolnik		Cold borscht involves use of dairy products and halves of boiled eggs.
Solyanka		A thick, spicy and sour soup that contains meat and pickled cucumbers
Fish Solyanka		Variation of solyanka replacing meat with fish.
Shchavel soup (green shchi)		Water or broth, sorrel leaves, salt, sometimes with whole eggs or egg yolks, potatoes, carrots, parsley root, and rice
Ukha		A clear soup, made from various types of fish

=== Salads ===
Name	Image	Description
Dressed herring (Seld pod shuboi)		Diced, salted herring covered with layers of grated, boiled vegetables (potatoes, carrots, beet roots), chopped onions, and mayonnaise
Mimosa salad		A festive salad, whose main ingredients are cheese, eggs, canned fish, onion, and mayonnaise.
Olivier salad (Stolichniy salad)		Diced potatoes, eggs, chicken or bologna, sweet peas, and pickles with a mayonnaise dressing. Other vegetables, such as carrot or fresh cucumbers, can be added.
Vinegret		Diced boiled vegetables (beet roots, potatoes, carrots), chopped onions, and sauerkraut and/or pickled cucumbers. Other ingredients, such as green peas or beans, are sometimes also added. Dressed with vinaigrette, mayonnaise or simply with sunflower or other vegetable oil.

=== Meat dishes ===
Name	Image	Description
Beef Stroganoff		Pieces of sautéed beef in sauce, with smetana (sour cream)
Bitok		Franco-Russian dish of minced meat formed into patties and fried; often served with a sour cream sauce.
Chicken Kiev		A dish made of chicken fillet pounded and rolled around cold butter, then coated with eggs and bread crumbs, and either fried or baked.
Golubtsy		Cooked cabbage leaves wrapped around a variety of fillings
Makarony po-flotski		Literally navy-style pasta, a dish made of cooked pasta (typically macaroni, penne or fusilli) mixed with stewed ground meat, fried onions and seasoned with salt and black pepper.
Pelmeni		Dumplings consisting of a meat filling wrapped in thin, pasta dough
Pozharsky cutlet	Pozharsky cutlet	A breaded ground chicken patty
Shashlyk		A dish of skewered and grilled cubes of meat.
Veal Orlov		A dish invented by the French consisting of braised loin of veal, thinly sliced, filled with a thin layer of pureed mushrooms and onions between each slice, topped with bechamel sauce and cheese. Various versions of this dish usually go by the name French-style meat in Russia today.

=== Pancakes ===
Name	Image	Description
Blini		Pancakes of various thickness and ingredients. Also known as blinchiki.
Oladyi		Small thick pancakes
Syrniki (tvorozhniki)		Fried pancakes made of tvorog, usually topped with sour cream, varenye, jam, honey, or apple sauce

=== Bread ===
Name	Image	Description
Baranka		A dough ring somewhat smaller than a bublik, but also thinner and drier
Borodinsky bread		Dark brown sourdough rye bread
Bublik		A ring of yeast-leavened wheat dough, that has been boiled in water for a short time before baking
Karavai		A large round braided bread, traditionally baked from wheat flour and decorated with symbolic flags and figurines, such as suns, moons, birds, animals, and pine cones.
Kalach		Historically, kalach meant any kind of white bread, and before modern methods of grinding wheat came into use, white bread was classed as a type of fancy bread.
Kulich		One of the two sine qua non attributes of the Russian Easter (the other is Paskha). A type of Easter bread.
Sushki		Traditional small, crunchy, mildly sweet bread rings eaten for dessert, usually with tea or coffee

=== Pirogi (pies) ===
Name	Image	Description
Kulyebyaka		A fish (usually salmon or sturgeon) loaf, with rice, hard-boiled eggs, mushrooms, and dill
Karelsky pirog		A traditional pirog from the region of Karelia.
Kurnik		A dome-shaped savoury type of Russian pirog, usually filled with chicken or turkey, eggs, onions, kasha or rice, and other optional components.
Rasstegai		The filling usually contains fish, but may also contain meat, liver, rice or mushrooms.
Pirog		A pie either with a sweet or savoury filling
Pirozhki		Small pies
Vatrushka		A pastry with a ring of dough and sweet tvorog in the middle

=== Kasha (porridge) ===
Name	Image	Description
Kasha		Porridge. Buckwheat, millet, oat and wheat kashas are widely popular in Russia.
Gorokhovaya kasha		Pease porridge, similar to British pease pudding.
Guriev porridge		A Russian porridge dish prepared from semolina and milk with the addition of nuts (hazelnut, walnuts, almonds), kaimak (creamy foams) and dried fruits.
Kutia		A ceremonial grain dish with sweet gravy.
Mannaya kasha		Semolina porridge, similar to the Guriev one.
Perlovka (Pearl barley kasha)		Pearl barley porridge.

=== Sauces ===
Name	Image	Description
Khren		A spicy paste made of grated horseradish.
Khrenovina		A spicy horseradish sauce served with a main course, which is very popular in Siberia.
Smetana		A dairy product produced by souring heavy cream.

=== Desserts ===
Name	Image	Description
Russian-style Charlotte		crunchy on the outside and soft inside pie with apples
Medovik		The identifying ingredients are honey and smetana (sour cream) or condensed milk.
Russian-style Napoleon cake		A dessert made of puff pastry layered with pastry cream.
Paskha		Tvorog (farmer's cheese) plus heavy cream, butter, sugar, vanilla, etc., usually molded in the form of a truncated pyramid. Traditional for Easter.
Pryanik		A range of traditional sweet baked goods made from flour and honey.
Pastila		It has been described as "small squares of pressed fruit paste" and "light, airy puffs with a delicate apple flavor".
Syrok		A type of sweet dairy food made from glazed or unglazed curd cheese with or without filling.
Khvorost		A traditional sweet crisp pastry made out of dough that has been shaped into thin twisted ribbons, deep-fried and sprinkled with powdered sugar
Pyshka (or Ponchik)		A Russian variety of doughnut.
Varenye		It is made by cooking berries, other fruits, or more rarely nuts, vegetables, or flowers, in sugar syrup.
Zefir		A type of soft confectionery made by whipping fruit and berry purée (mostly apple puree) with sugar and egg whites with subsequent addition of a gelling agent like pectin, carrageenan, agar, or gelatine.

== Beverages ==
=== Non-alcoholic drinks ===
Name	Image	Description
Kissel		Fruit dessert of sweetened juice, thickened with arrowroot, cornstarch or potato starch
Kompot		Non-alcoholic sweet beverage, that may be served hot or cold, depending on tradition and season. It is obtained by cooking fruit such as strawberries, apricots, peaches, apples, rhubarb, gooseberries, or sour cherries in a large volume of water, often together with sugar or raisins as additional sweeteners.
Kvass		A fermented non-alcoholic beverage made from black or regular rye bread or dough
Mors		A non-carbonated Russian fruit drink prepared from berries, mainly from lingonberry and cranberry (although sometimes blueberries, strawberries, sea buckthorns or raspberries).
Ryazhenka		It is made from baked milk by lactic acid fermentation.
Sbiten		A traditional Russian honey-based drink with herbs and spices
Varenets		A fermented milk product that is popular in Russia. Similar to ryazhenka, it is made by adding sour cream (smetana) to baked milk.
Raf coffee		A very popular latte-style coffee drink invented in the 1990s
Baikal		Carbonated soft drink based on natural herbs and extracts.

=== Alcoholic drinks ===
Name	Image	Description
Medovukha		A traditional Russian honey-based drink analogous to its counterparts of other Indo-European peoples
Vodka		It is composed primarily of water and ethanol, but sometimes with traces of impurities and flavorings. Traditionally it is made by distilling the liquid from cereal grains or potatoes that have been fermented, though some modern brands use fruits or sugar as the base.
Kvass		A fermented cereal-based non-alcoholic or low alcoholic beverage with a slightly cloudy appearance, light-brown colour and sweet-sour taste. It stems from the northeastern part of Europe, where the grain production is thought to have been insufficient for beer to become a daily drink. Especially popular during summer

== See also ==
- Khrushchev dough
- Mikoyan cutlet
- List of Russian desserts
- List of Russian restaurants
- Russian candy

== Bibliography ==
- Curtin, Jeremiah (1909). A journey in Southern Siberia. Boston: Little, Brown and Company.
