= List of Russian desserts =

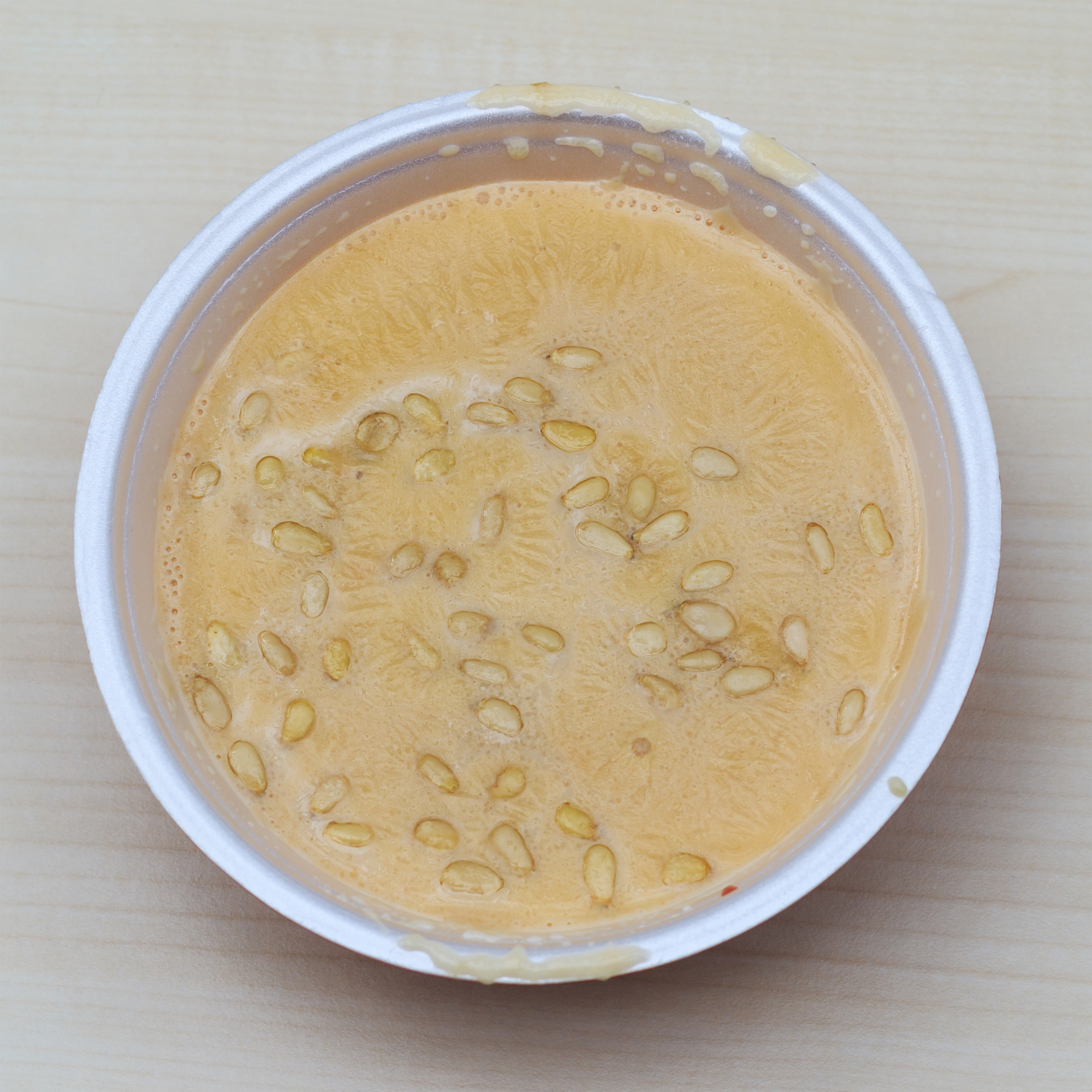
Guryev porridge

This is a list of Russian desserts. Russian cuisine is a collection of the different cooking traditions of the Russian people. Russian cuisine derives its varied character from the vast and multi-cultural expanse of Russia.

== Desserts ==
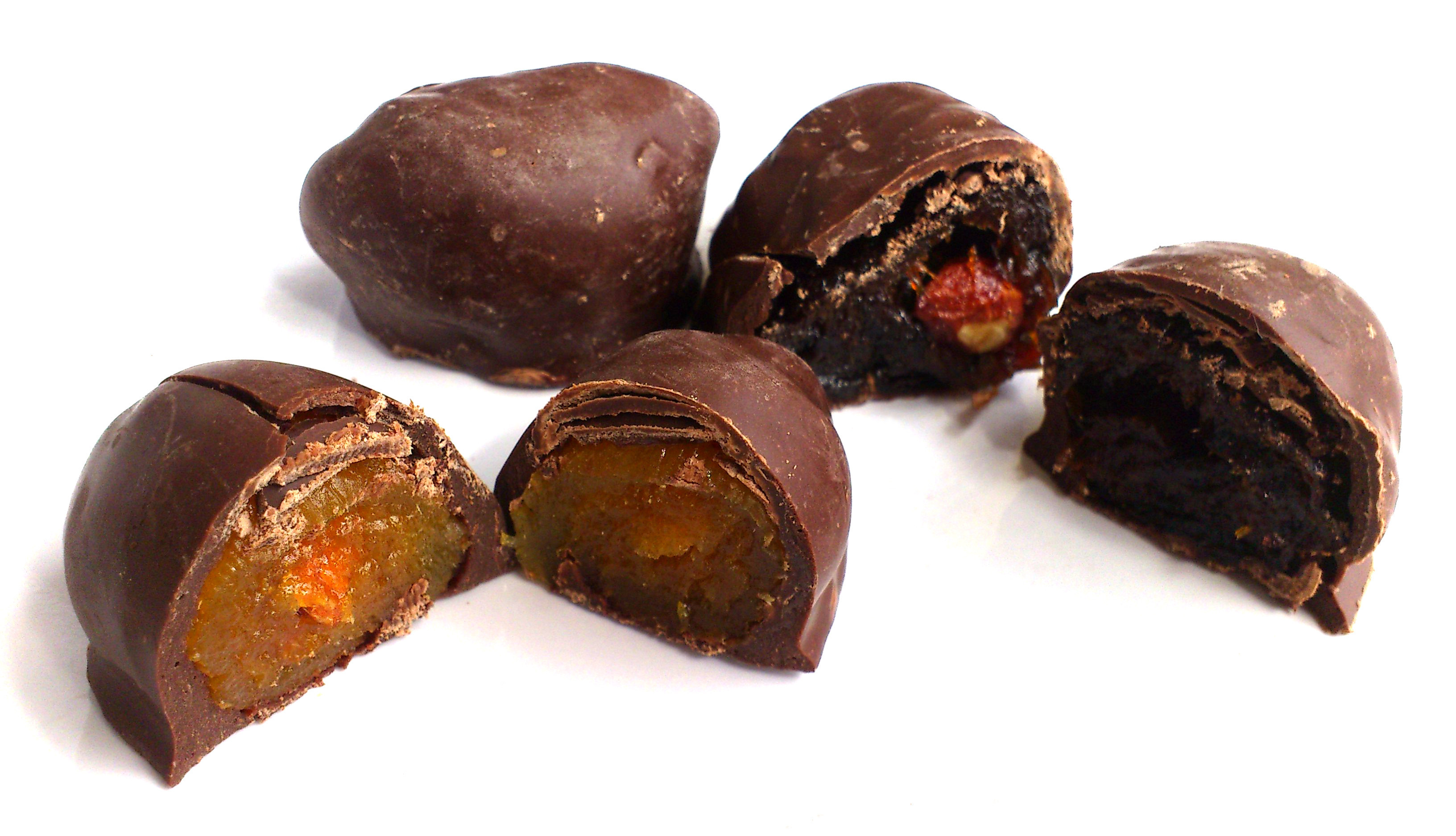
Chocolate-covered dried apricots and prunes

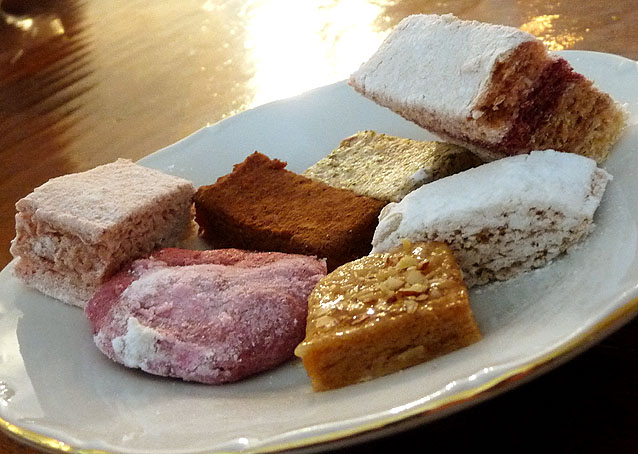
Pastila

- Blini (blintz)
- Leningradsky cake
- Kinuski
- Plombir
- Chocolate-covered prune
- Cream tubes
- Curd snack
- Varenyky
- Khvorost (angel wings)
- Guryev porridge
- Hematogen
- Kissel
- Kulich
- Kutia
- Medovik (a layered honey cake)
- Napoleon (mille-feuille)
- Oladyi
- Paskha
- Pastila (a traditional Russian fruit confectionery)
- Pirog
- Pirozhki
- Ponchiki or Pyshka
- Pryanik
  - Tula pryanik
  - Vyazma pryanik
- Ptichye moloko ("bird's milk")
- Sunflower Halva
- Sushki
- Syrniki
- Varenye
- Vatrushka
- Zefir

== Gallery ==
Russian desserts

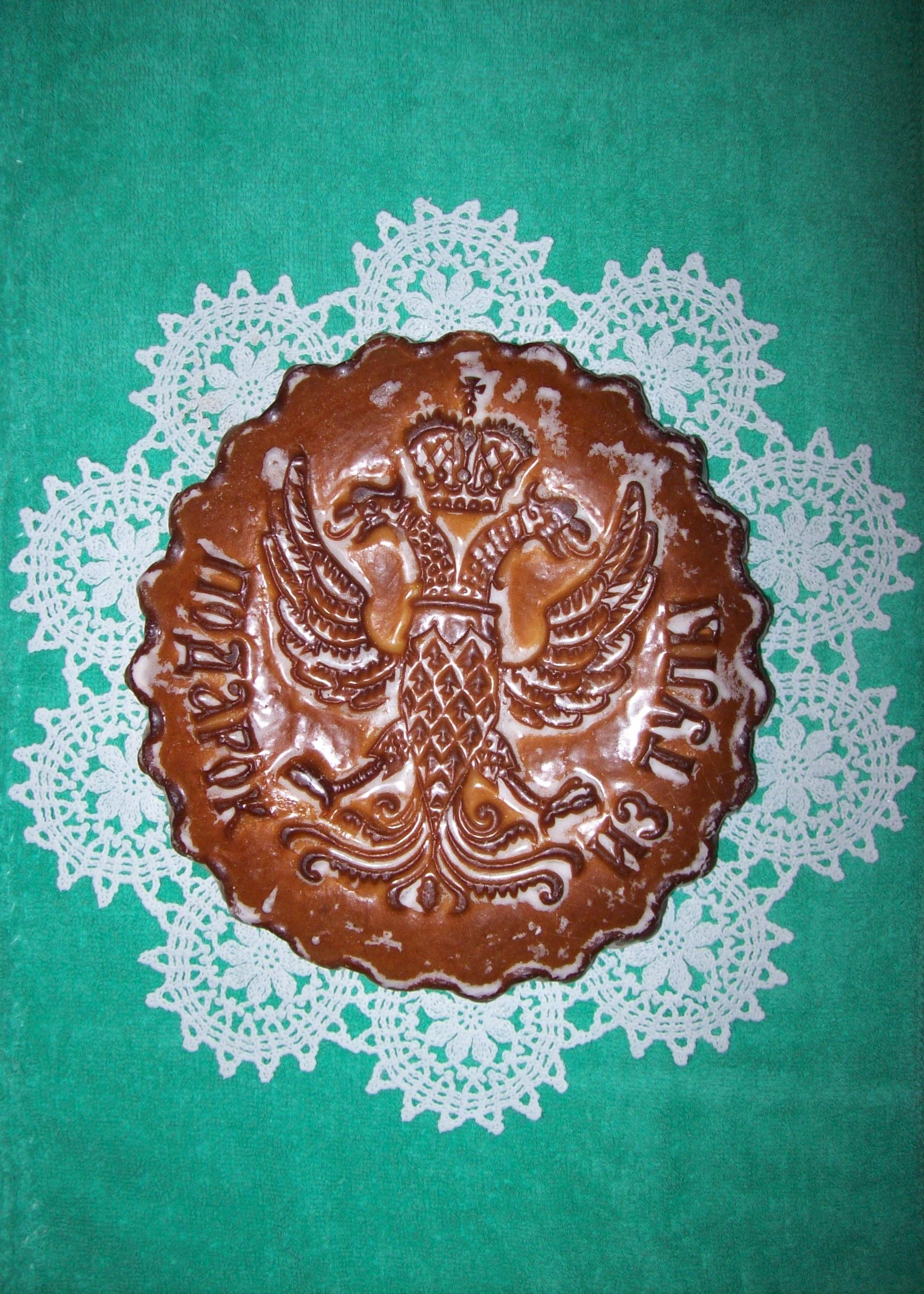
Tula pryanik

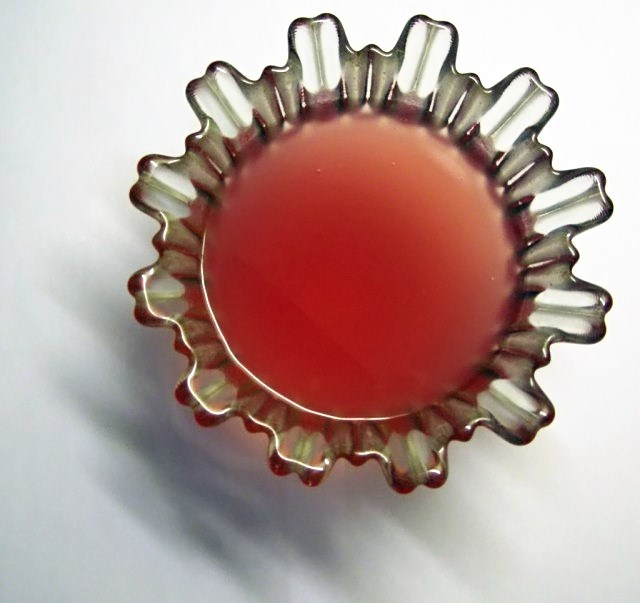
Red currant kissel

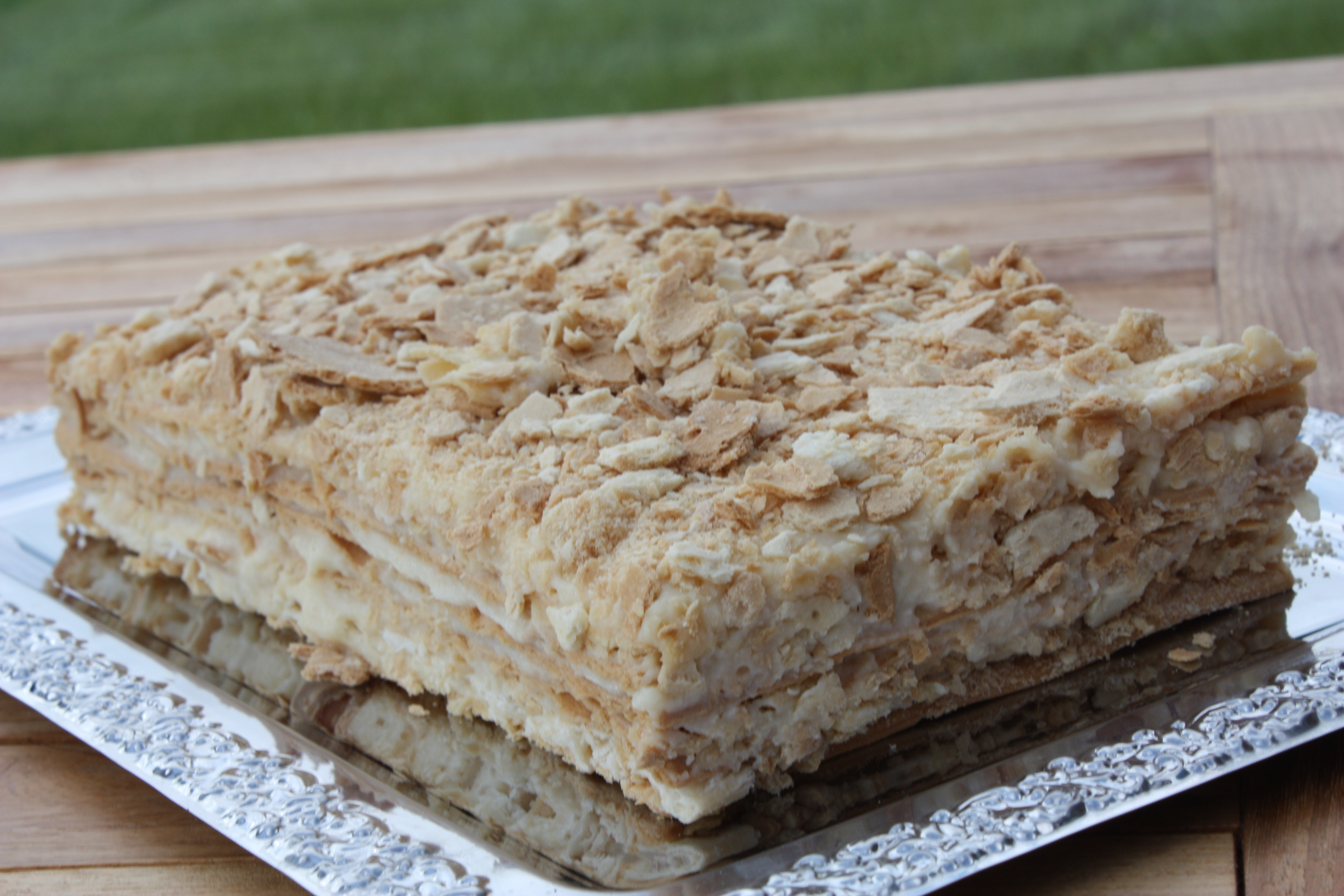
Napoleon

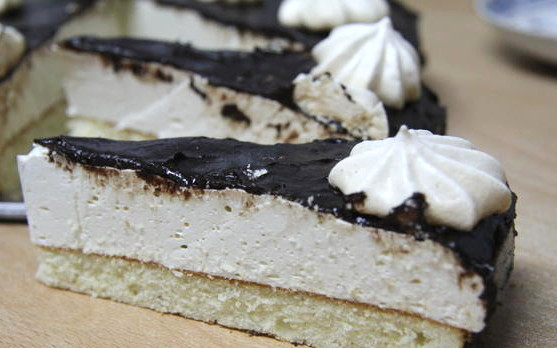
Ptichye moloko cake

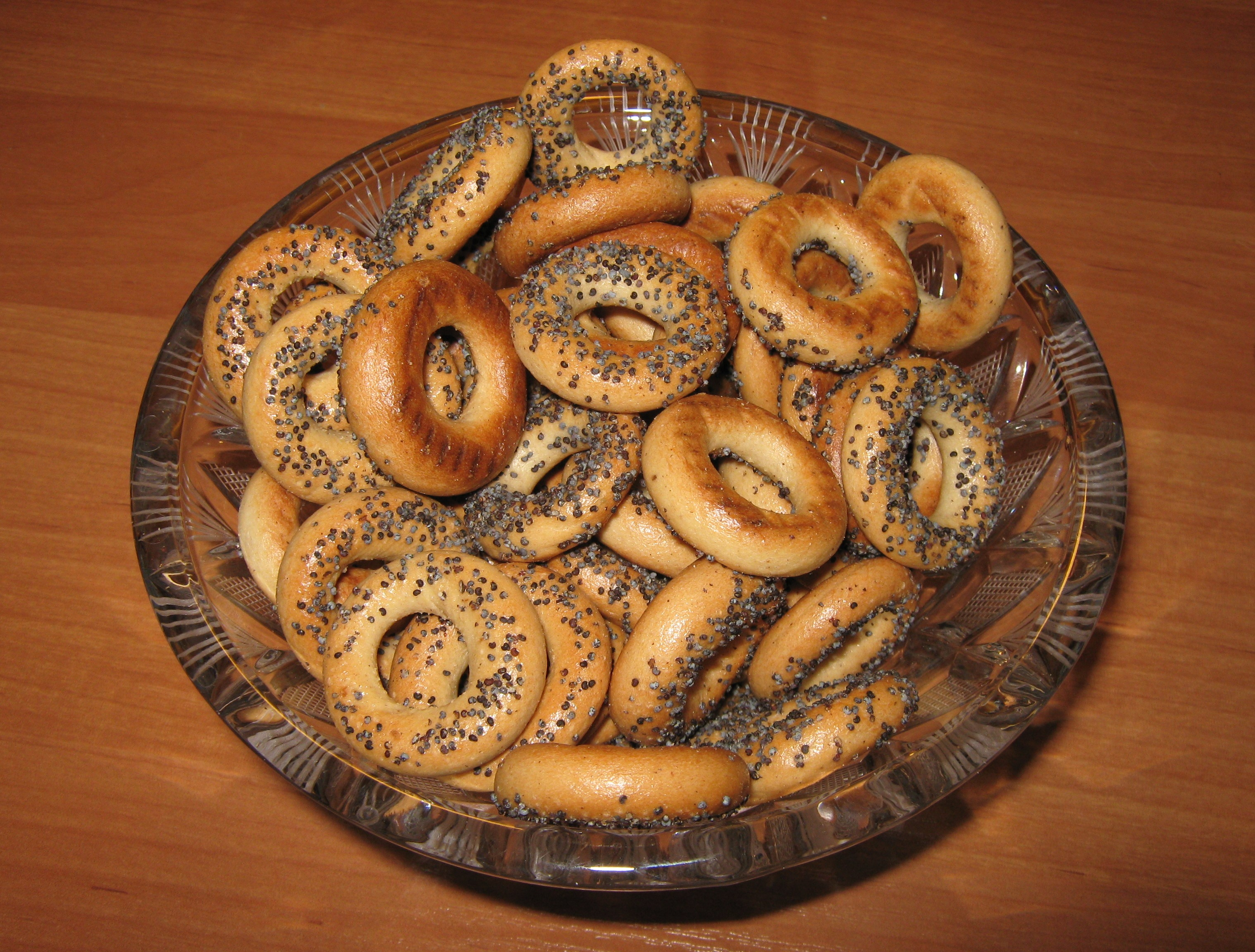
Poppy-seed sushki

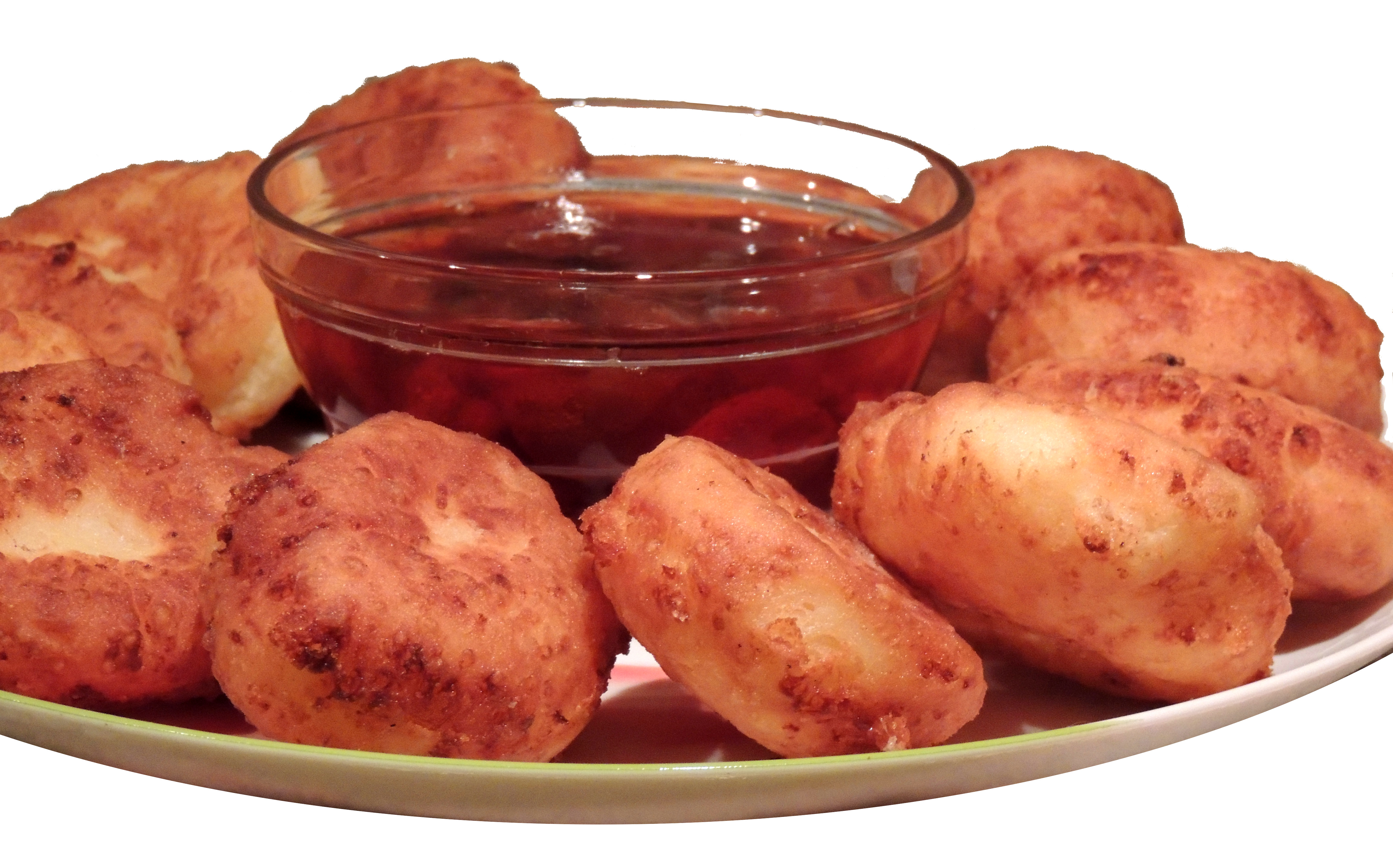
Syrniki served with varenye

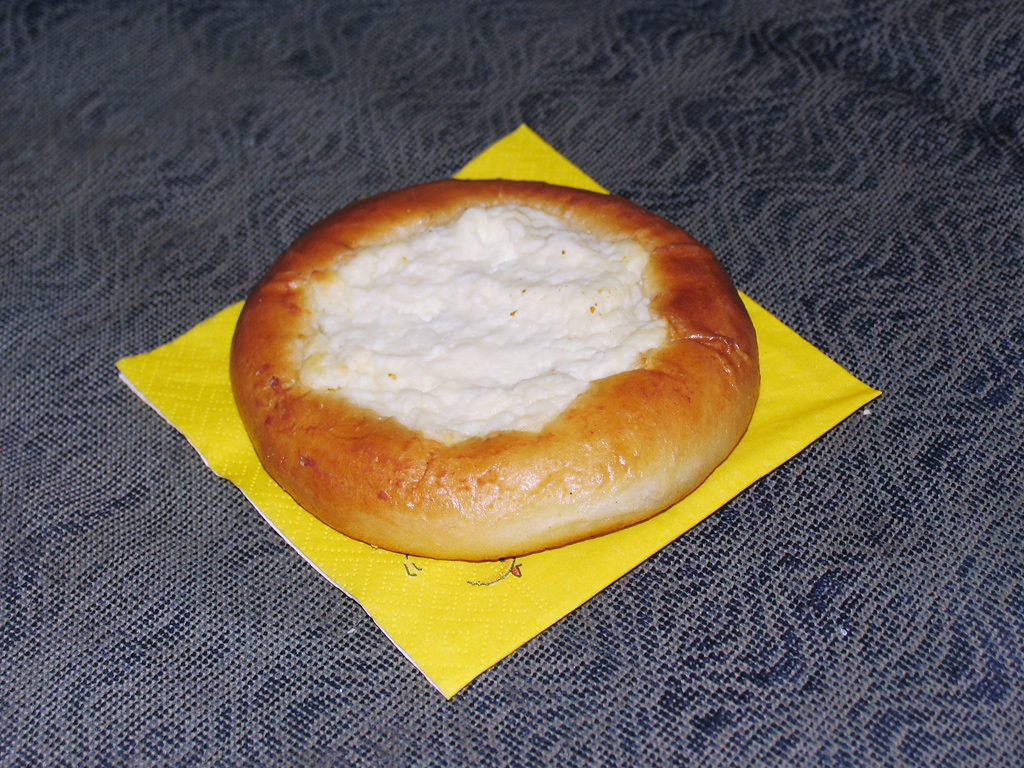
Vatrushka

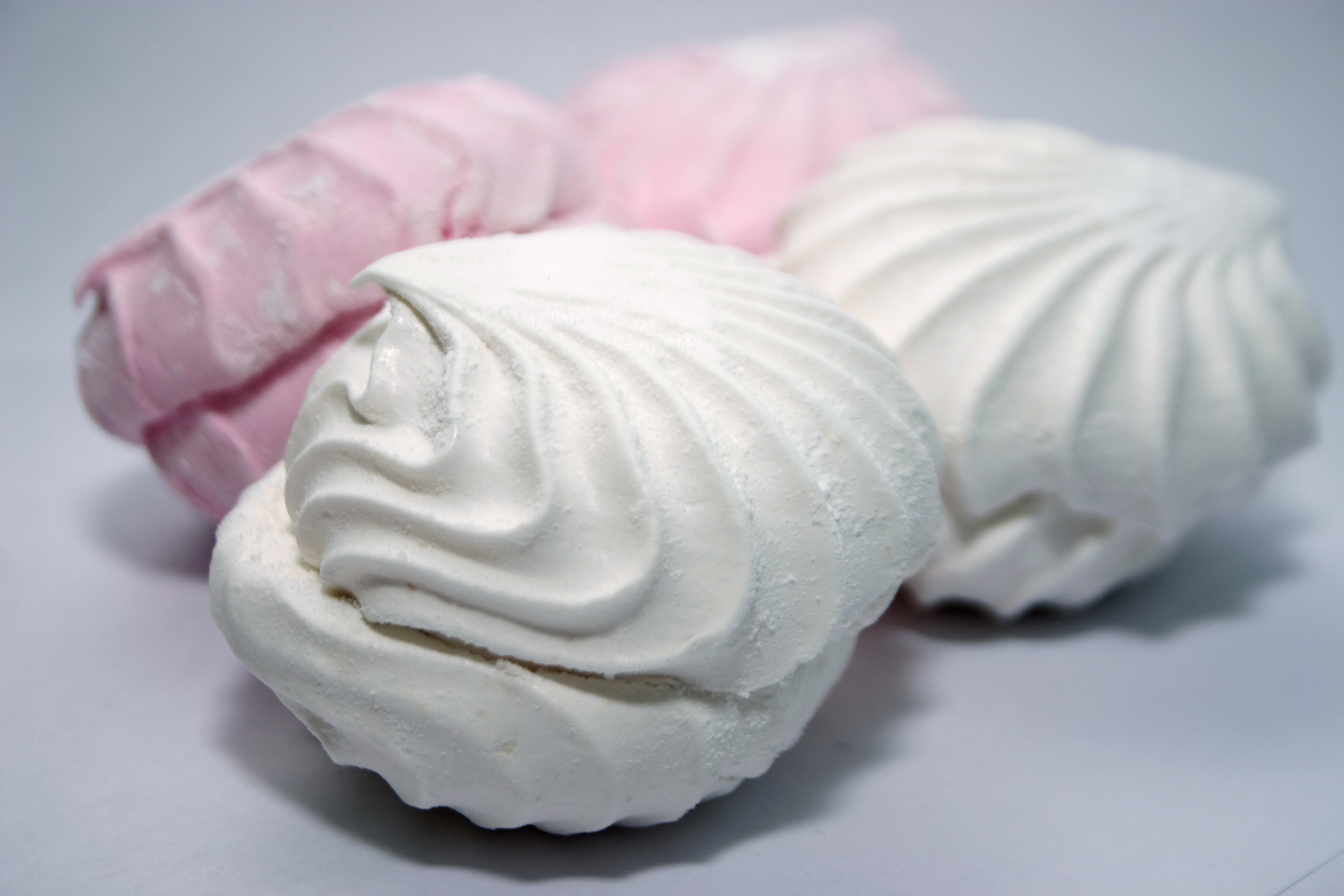
Zefir

== See also ==
- List of desserts
- List of Russian dishes
