= Bitok =

Bitok may refer to:

== People with the surname ==
- Ezequiel Bitok (born 1966), Kenyan marathon runner
- Paul Bitok (born 1970), Kenyan long-distance track runner and two-time Olympic medallist
- Sostenes Bitok (born 1957), Kenyan long-distance track runner and 1984 Olympian

== Other uses ==
- Bitok, a Franco-Russian dish of minced meat formed into patties and fried; often served with a sour cream sauce.
- Bitok, a variant of the birau (boat), a small dugout canoe of the Sama-Bajau people of the Philippines
