= Mors (drink) =

Non-carbonated fruit drink

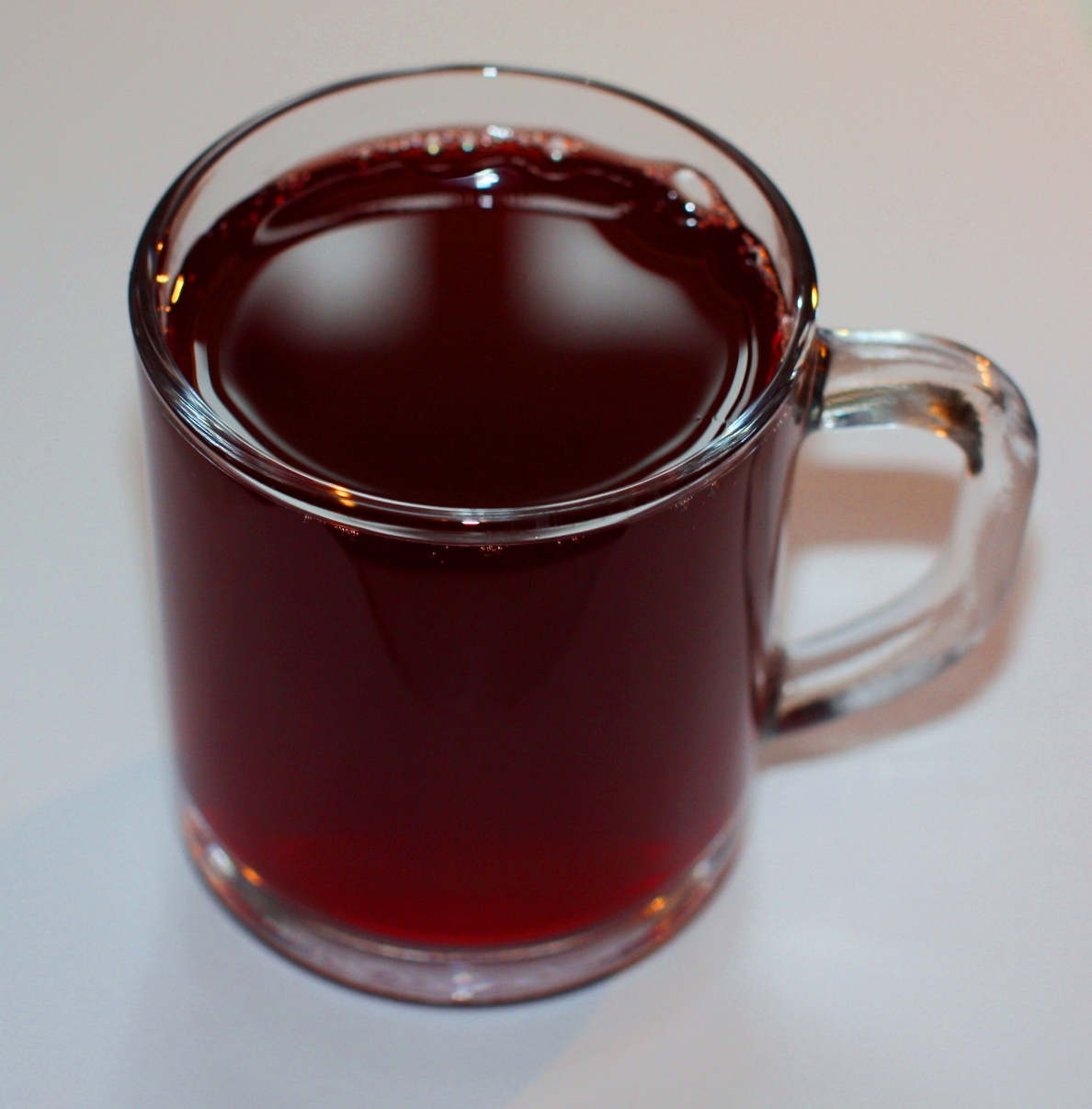
Glass of mors

Mors (Russian: морс) is a Russian non-carbonated fruit drink prepared from berries, generally lingonberries and cranberries (alternatively bilberries, strawberries, raspberries or sea-buckthorn may be used), popular in Russia, Ukraine, other Slavic countries and the Baltic countries.

== History ==
A recipe for Mors can be found in the Domostroy, a 16th-century Russian set of household rules, but it is likely that the drink existed prior to this.

== Preparation ==
It is made by boiling berries with sugar or honey and lemon juice, or by mixing pure juice with sweetened water. Some modern commercial brands use fermented and clarified juices blended with sugar syrup and drinking water. Instead of juice, fruit extracts may be used with the addition of aromatic essences, organic food acids, sugars, dyes, and drinking water.

Mors is sometimes mixed with vodka to make an alcoholic cocktail.

== See also ==
- Kissel
- Kompot
- Kvass
- List of Russian dishes
- Russian cuisine
