= Guryev porridge =

Porridge made with semolina, nuts, milk and dried fruit

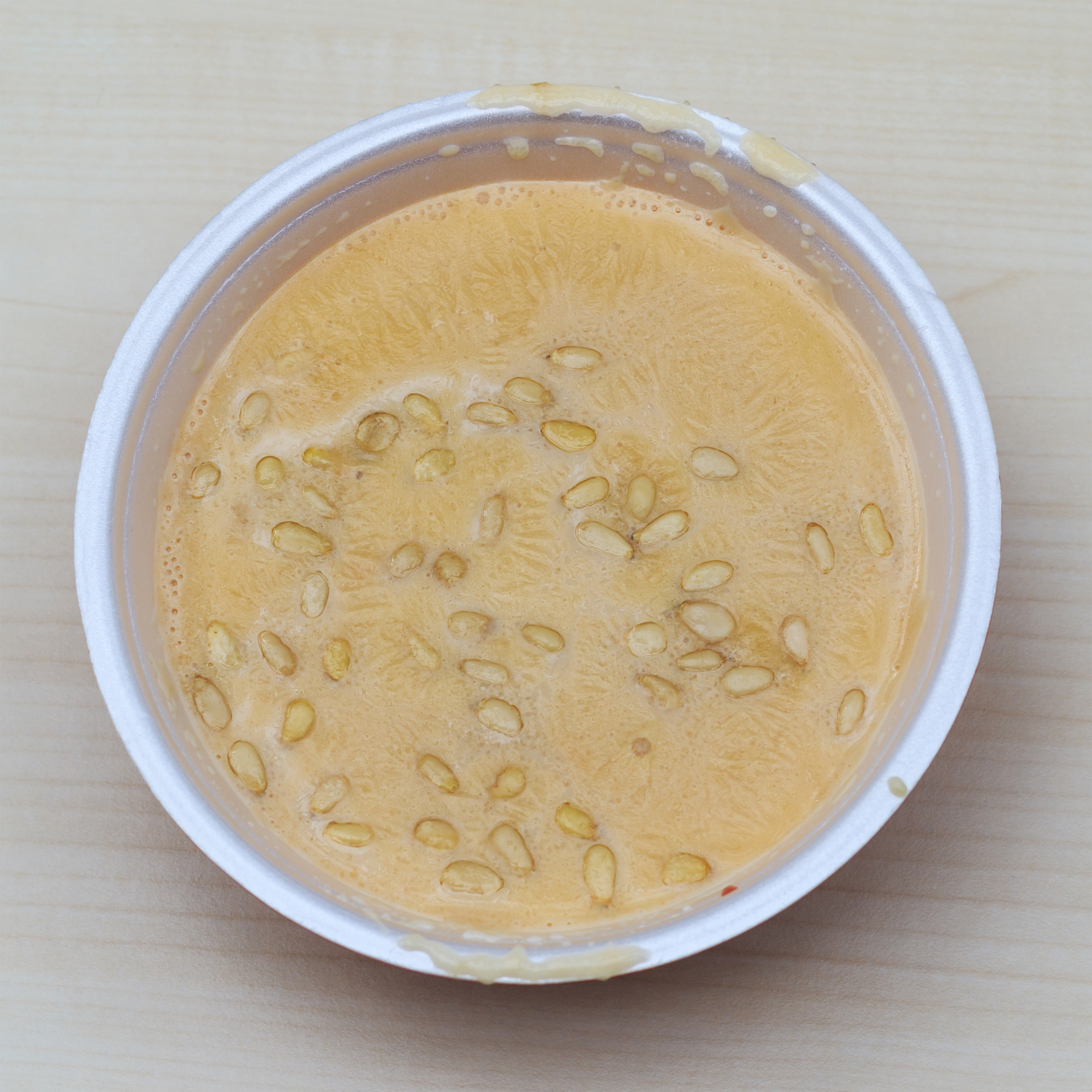
Guryev porridge

Guryev porridge (Note: Аlso translated as Guryev kasha or Guriev kasha) (Russian: Гурьевская каша, romanized: Guryevskaya kasha) is a Russian sweet porridge (kasha) prepared from semolina and milk with the addition of candied nuts (hazelnut, walnuts, almonds), honey and dried fruits (or fruit preserves).

Traditional preparation of the dessert is made by baking milk or cream until a golden milk skin forms. Then, this skin is lifted and used to separate the dish's ingredients by layers with the skin between each layer. It is then sprinkled on top with sugar and browned in a broiler.

== History ==
The name of Guryev porridge comes from the name of Count Dmitry Alexandrovich Guryev (1751–1825), Minister of Finance and member of the State Council of the Russian Empire.

It has been stated that Guryev porridge was invented by Zakhar Kuzmin, a serf chef of the retired major of the Orenburg dragoon regiment Georgy Jurisovsky, who was visited by Guryev. Subsequently, Guryev bought Kuzmin with his family and made him a regular chef in his court. According to another version, Guryev himself came up with a recipe for porridge.

It was a beloved dish of Emperor Alexander III. Prior to the October 17, 1888 train crash that Alexander III was on, the emperor was served this dish for dessert. When the waiter came to the emperor to pour the cream, a terrible blow occurred, and the train derailed.

== See also ==
- List of porridges
- List of Russian desserts
- List of Russian dishes
