= Bitok (food) =

Minced meat dish

Bitok is a Franco-Russian savoury dish of minced meat formed into patties and fried. The most frequently used meats are beef and veal. Bitok is frequently served with sour cream sauce, but there are many other possible accompaniments. The word is a bilingual corruption of the English "beefsteak".

== History and etymology ==
The Russian term bitok (plural bitki) is derived ultimately from the English "beefsteak". In eighteenth century France the English word was corrupted to "beeft Stek" which by the nineteenth century had become "biffteck" and is now bifteck. Russian chefs took bifteck haché – minced beef – and made it into patties to be shallow-fried or deep-fried; they rendered the French biftek as bitok. That dish was introduced to France in about 1920 and subsequently appeared on French menus in several varying forms either called bitok or bifteck à la russe.

== Content ==
Minced meat – originally beef, but according to Larousse Gastronomique the meat can also be mutton, pork, veal, chicken, rabbit etc. – is mixed with milk-soaked bread and finely chopped onion (either raw or lightly fried) and the mixture is put through the mincer again for smoothness. The mixture is shaped into small round cakes (Larousse), dumplings (Hering's Dictionary) or patties (Pierre Franey) about 1½ inches (3.8 cm) thick. A variant is to shape the mixture into small balls. They may be deep-fried or shallow fried; if the former they may be served with a sauce of sour cream or double cream with paprika; if the latter they are customarily fried in butter and then simmered briefly in sour cream.

== Variants ==
- Carnot: minced veal mixed with bread soaked in water, butter and eggs, shaped into flat round cakes; an indent is made on the top and filled with a goose liver purée, poached, cooled, coated with thick Mornay sauce, dipped in egg and breadcrumbs and deep fried.
- Po Kassatzki: prepared and cooked in the same way as Carnot but stuffed with scrambled eggs mixed with chopped truffle, covered with tomato sauce.
- Nowgorodski: made of raw minced beef mixed with soaked white bread, chopped fried onions, shaped into small round flat dumplings, rolled in breadcrumbs, fried in butter, served with deep-fried onion rings and a Madeira sauce.
- Po russki: raw chopped beef or veal, prepared in a similar way to mixed with Nowgorodski, bordered with sliced boiled potatoes, covered with thick sour cream sauce, sprinkled with breadcrumbs and grated Parmesan cheese and browned in an oven.
- Skobeleff: prepared like po Kassatzki, but stuffed with salpicon of ham, ox tongue, mushrooms and truffle, fried, covered with truffle sauce.
- tatarski: minced raw beef, seasoned, mixed with an egg yolk and a little butter, shaped into very small flat dumplings, browned quickly on both sides in butter, the inside kept blood rare, served in the small skillet in which they were fried.

== Sources ==
- Bickel, Walter (1989). Hering's Dictionary of Classical and Modern Cookery (eleventh ed.). London: Virtue. ISBN 978-3-8057-0307-9.
- Franey, Pierre; Bryan Miller (1989). Cuisine rapide. New York: Times Books. ISBN 0-81-291746-4.
- Hellman, Renée, ed. (1967). Celebrity Cooking. London. OCLC 460947.
- Montagné, Prosper (1976). Larousse gastronomique. London: Hamlyn. OCLC 1285641881.
