= Salpicon =

Dish in Latin American cuisine

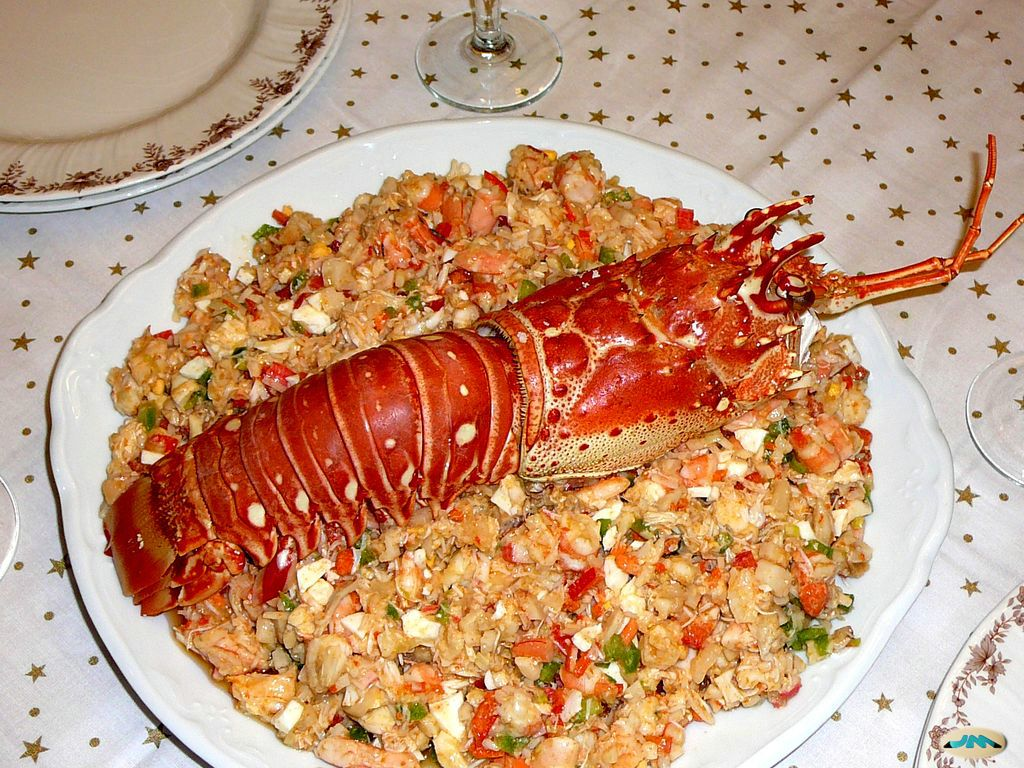
- Seafood salpicon, an example from Spanish cuisine
- Region or state: Southern Europe, Latin America, Philippines

Salpicon (Spanish: salpicón, meaning "hodgepodge" or "medley"; Portuguese: salpicão) is a dish of one or more ingredients diced or minced and bound with a sauce or liquid. There are different versions found in Spanish and the broader Latin American cuisine and Filipino cuisine. A salpicon is sometimes used as stuffing.

In Central American cuisine the dish is similar, with some varieties. In Nicaragua, salpicon is a mixture of minced meat mixed with green bell pepper, onion, salt and lime. It is served hot or cold, and with white rice and plantains (boiled, fried, etc.). In El Salvador the minced meat gets mixed with mint, radish, onion, garlic and lime. It is also served alongside white rice, and sometimes beans. In Honduras, rabbit meat is also used.

In South American cuisine there are also different varieties. In Colombian cuisine, salpicón is a fruit cocktail beverage made with a base of watermelon and/or orange juice, which gives it its bright red color, and soda water. In Peru it is "Salpicón de pollo", a chicken salad with vegetables, mayonnaise, lime, and herbs.

In Mexican cuisine, the term refers to a salad mixture containing thinly sliced or chopped flank steak, onion, oregano, chile serrano, avocado, tomatoes, and vinegar. The mixture is commonly served on tostadas, tacos or as a filling of poblano peppers.

In Filipino cuisine, it is known specifically as "beef salpicao" (or rarely, "beef salpicado") and is made from seared or stir-fried tender cubes or thin strips of beef in oil, salt, black pepper, and characteristically, minced garlic. A sauce is then added, usually made from soy sauce, butter, and sugar (also Worcestershire sauce or oyster sauce). It is eaten with rice. It is also known as salpicado de solomillo in Philippine Spanish.

== Gallery ==
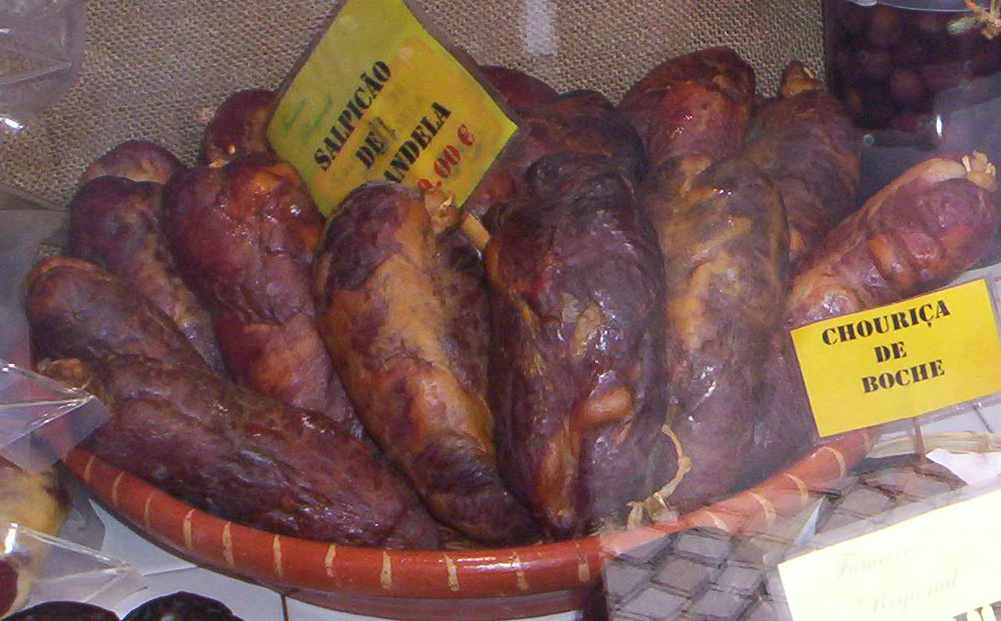
Portuguese salpicão, a type of sausage

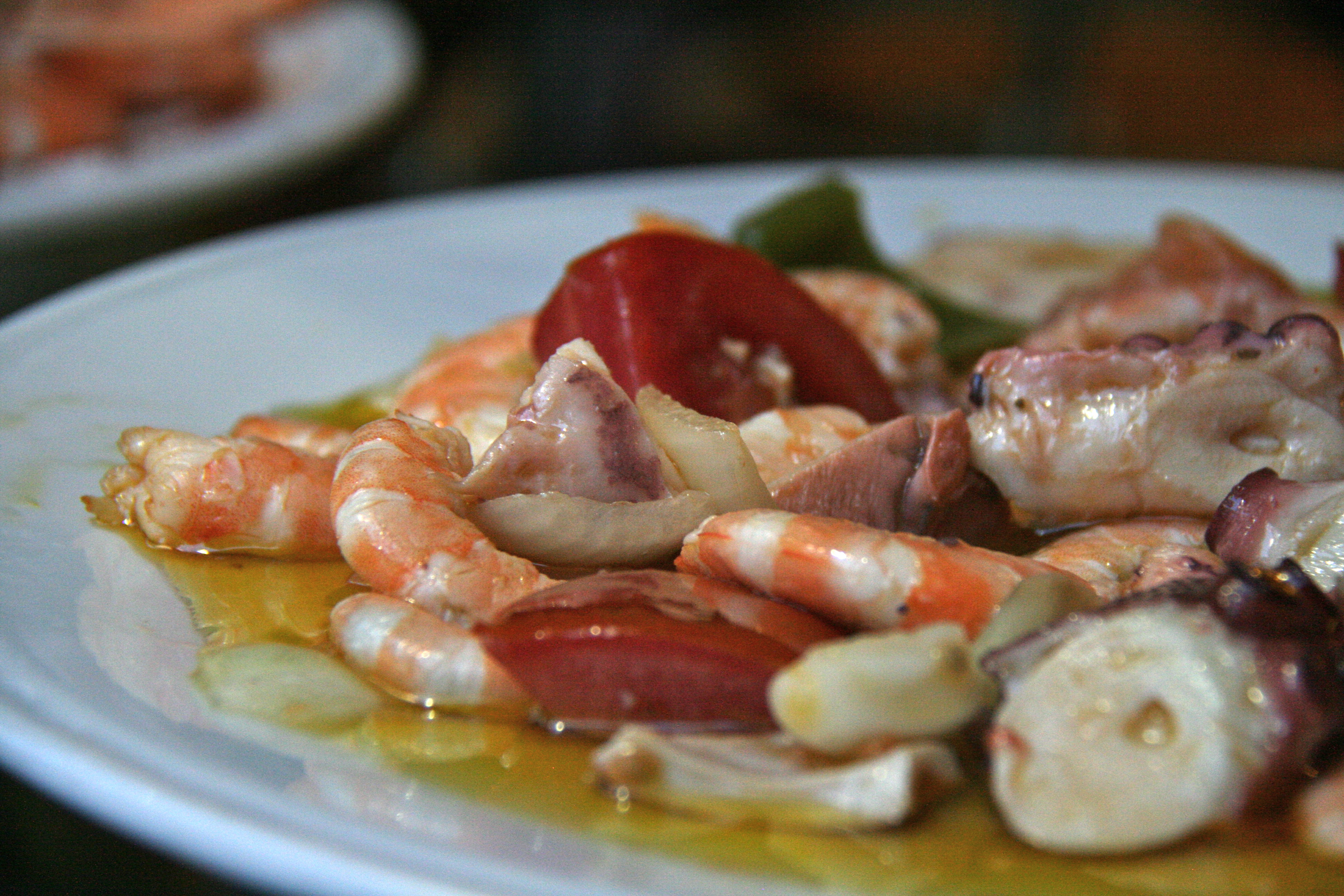
Spanish salpicón de mariscos, a seafood salad

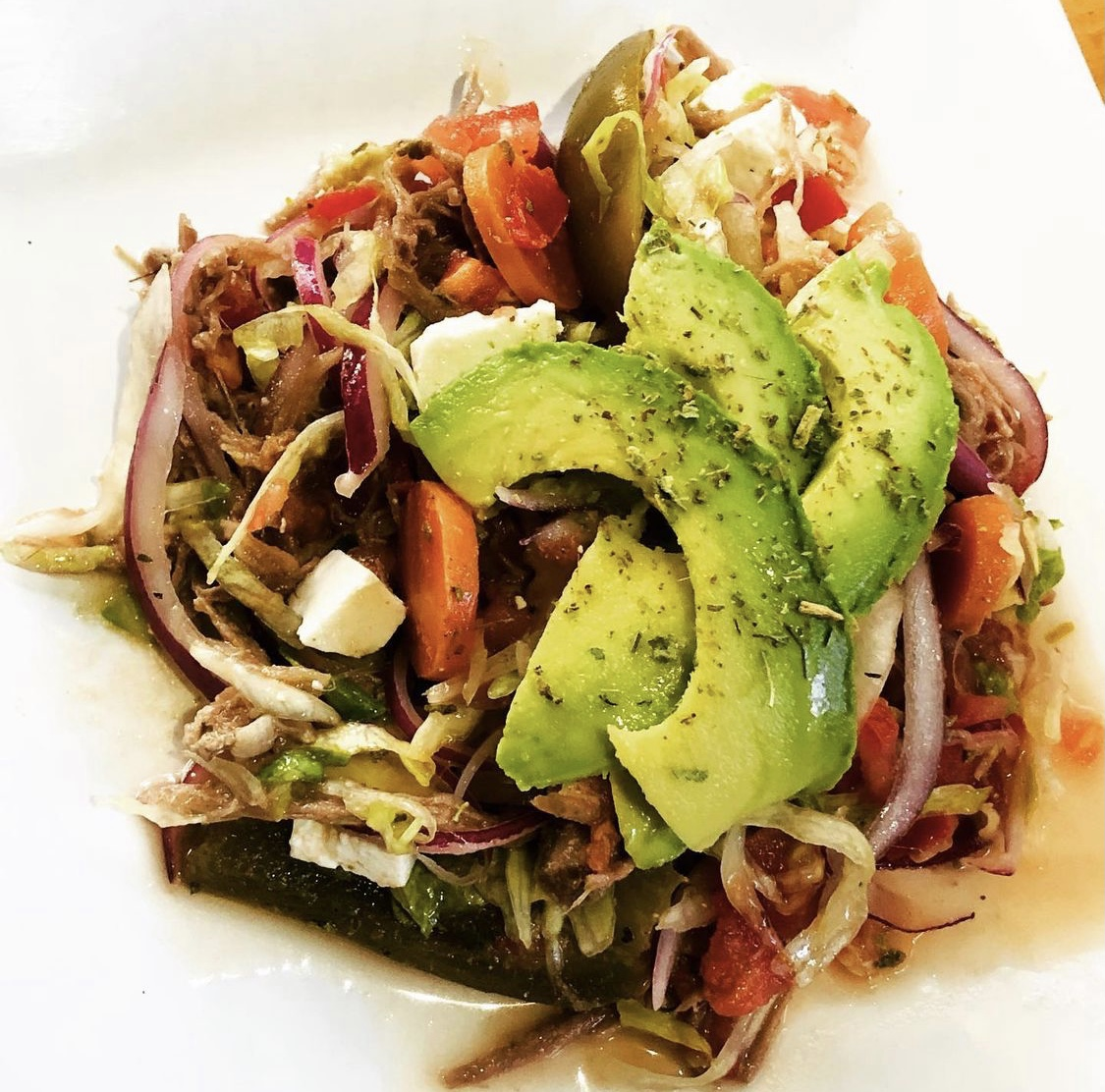
Mexican salpicón de res, a beef salad

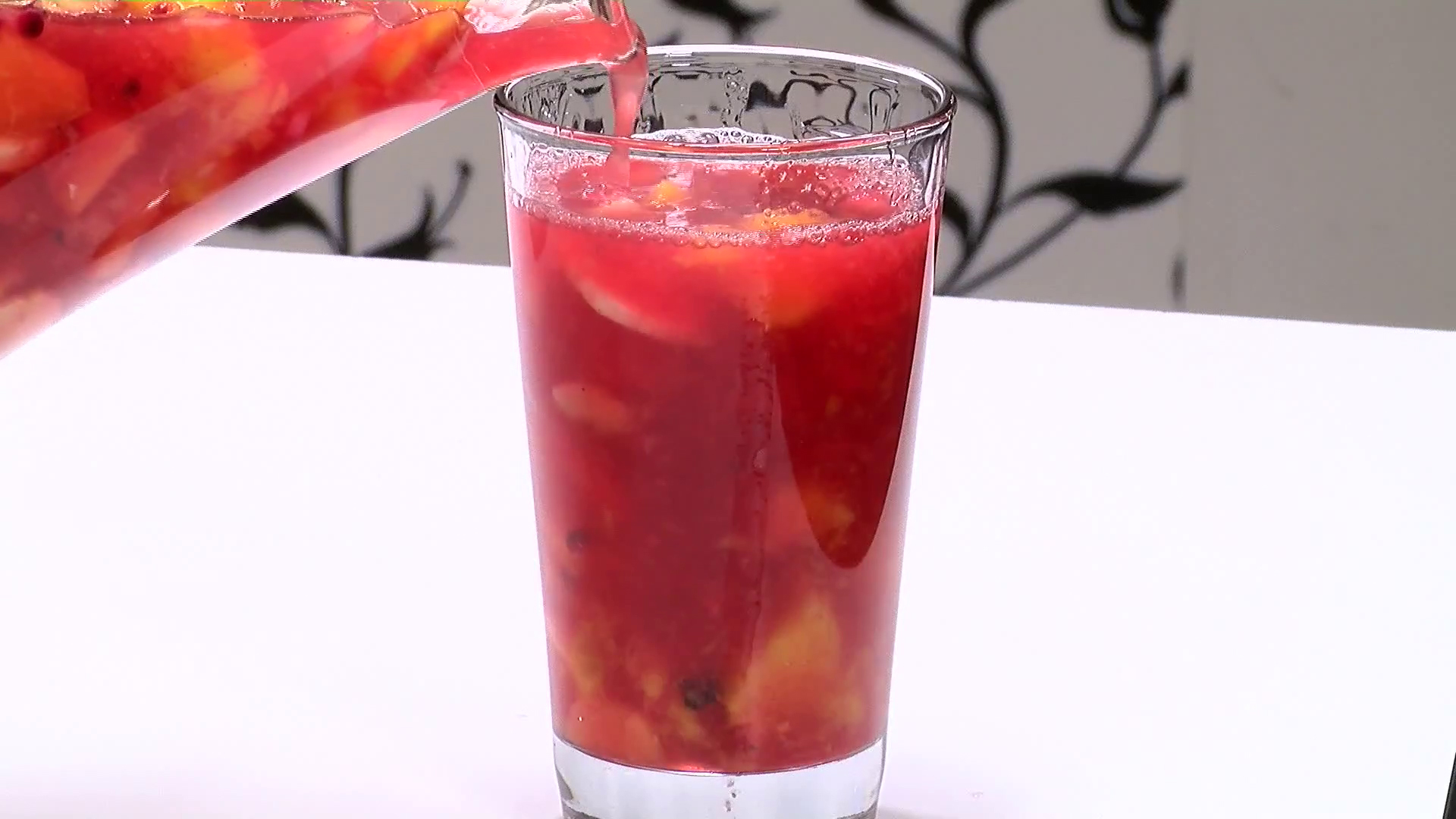
Colombian salpicón de frutas, a fruit cocktail beverage

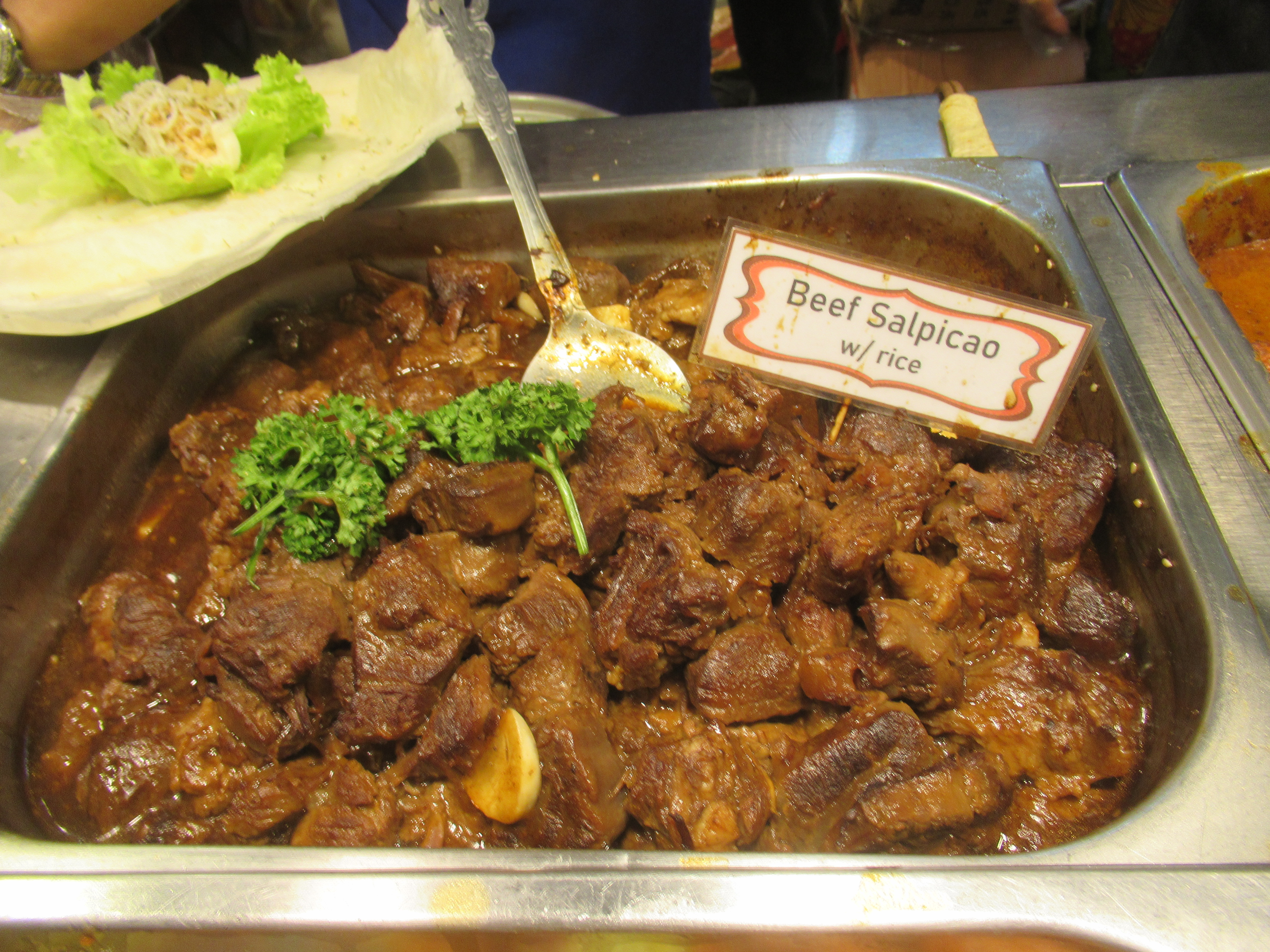
Filipino beef salpicao (salpicado de solomillo), a garlicky beef dish
