= Mikoyan cutlet =

Soviet meat product

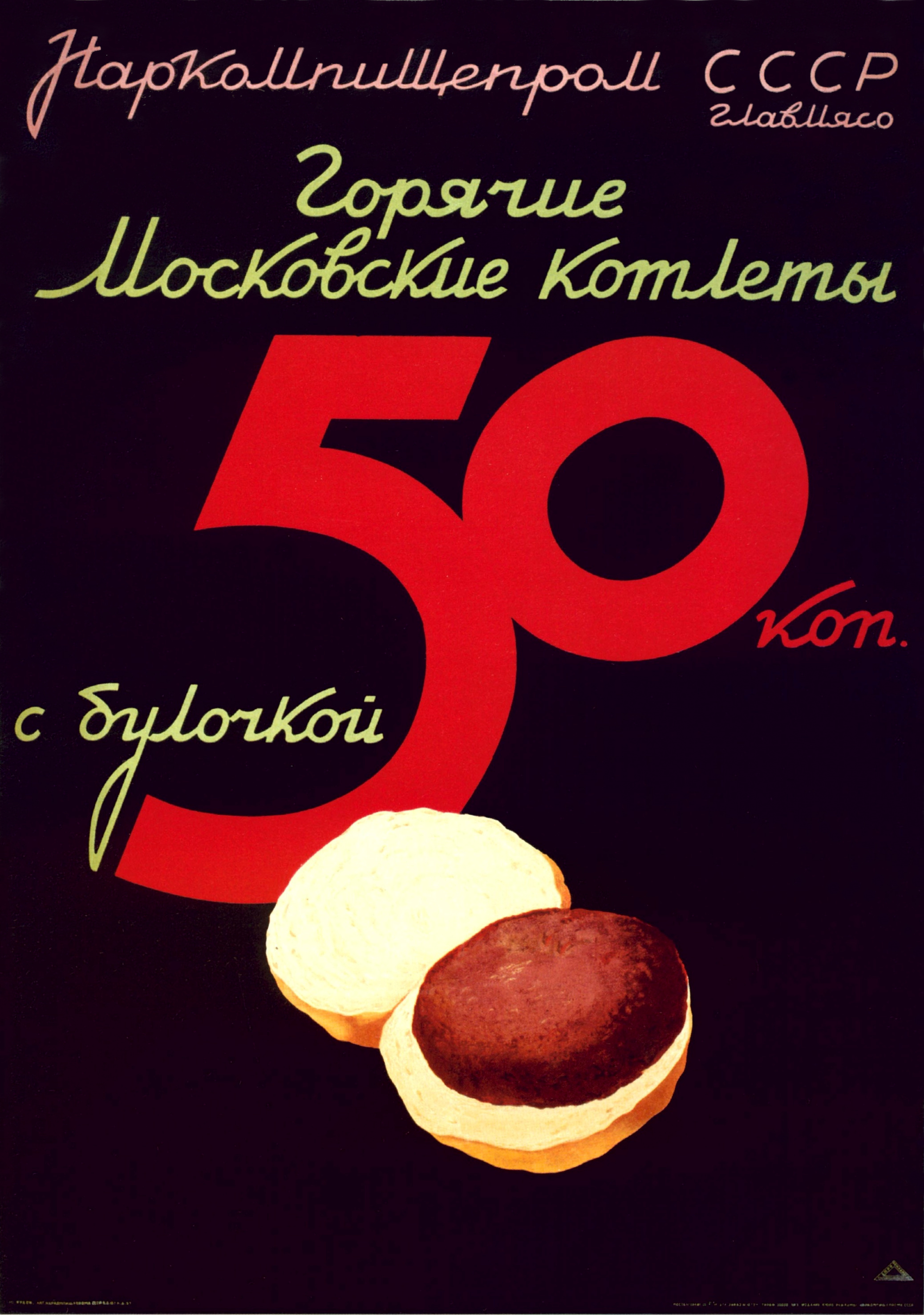
"Hot Moscow cutlets with a bun". Advertising poster by the People's Commissariat of Food Industry, 1937. The price (50 kopecks) corresponds to 5 kopecks after the 1961 monetary reform.

Mikoyan cutlet (Russian: микояновская котлета, romanized: mikojanovskaja kotleta) was a Soviet semi-processed ground meat cutlet variety based on the American hamburger beef patty, nicknamed after Soviet politician Anastas Mikoyan. In 1964, The New York Times reported that the Mikoyan cutlet was "the cheapest, most popular if not most revered piece of meat a few kopecks can buy".

== History ==
In 1936, Anastas Mikoyan, who at the time was People's Commissar of Food Industry of the USSR, went on a trip to the United States to boost economic cooperation and study the development of the US economy. During his visit to the United States Mikoyan studied the system of Macy's department store in New York. There Mikoyan took notice of the mass production of hamburger patties and ordered 22 hamburger-producing appliances. However, due to the subsequent World War II, the production of patties in the Soviet Union failed and the so-called Mikoyan cutlets appeared instead. The cutlets usually contained about 50% pork or beef, 45% bread crumbs and 5% other ingredients. Some varieties bore names of well known Russian restaurant dishes, such as Kiev cutlets or Pozharsky cutlets, but their ingredients had little in common with the original dishes. While Mikoyan cutlets were mass-produced for ordinary people, being sold from 3 to 5 kopeks each, Mikoyan's factories supplied the Soviet officials with first-class sausages, hams and other delicacies.

The name "Mikoyan cutlets" still circulated occasionally in the beginning of perestroika.

== See also ==
- The Book of Tasty and Healthy Food
- Khrushchev dough
- Soviet cuisine
- Woolton pie
- List of meat dishes
