= Pastila =

Russian fruit confectionary

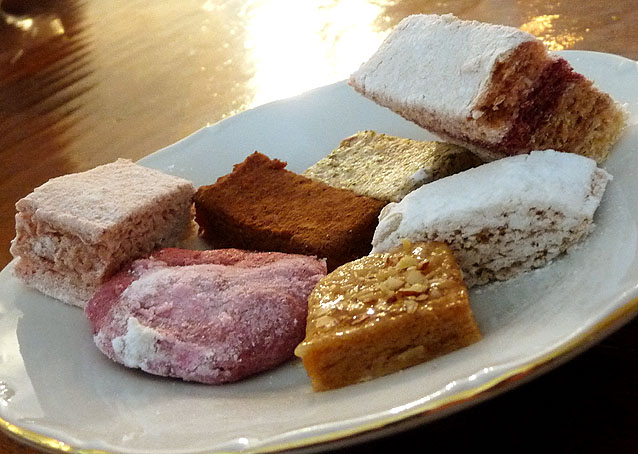
- Pastila from Kolomna
- Course: Confectionery
- Place of origin: Russia
- Main ingredients: fruit purée, egg whites, sugar or honey
- Variations: Food coloring

Pastila (Russian: пастила́ [pəsʲtʲɪˈɫa]) is a traditional Russian fruit confectionery (pâte de fruits). It has been described as "small squares of pressed fruit paste" and "light, airy puffs with a delicate apple flavor". In Imperial Russia, the "small jellied sweetmeats" were served for tea "with a white foamy top, a bit like marshmallow, but tasting of pure fruit".

Pastila is also eaten in Kazakhstan, primarily as a popular dessert or delicacy often served with tea. It is a sweet, colorful fruit and berry paste, and a common offering in Kazakh cuisine alongside other Russian and Central Asian sweets.

The first mentions of pastila in Russian written sources date back to the 16th century. The name is probably a loanword from Italian: pastello or pastiglia, or from the cognate French: pastille which in turn comes from Latin: pastillus (a loaf or pie, cf. pastilla).

In the 19th century, pastila was made from sourish Russian apples such as Antonovka or mashed Northern berries (lingonberry, rowan, currants) sweetened with honey or sugar and lightened with egg whites. The paste was baked in the Russian oven for many hours, then arranged in several layers inside an alder box and then left to dry in the same oven.

In Imperial Russia, pastila was considered an expensive treat. Priced at one rouble and a half, it was produced at noblemen's manors by serf labor. The cheapest pastila was made with honey instead of sugar. The Russian stove afforded two days of steadily diminishing heat to bake the fruit paste. A Tatar variety was strained through a fine sieve, which helped keep apple seeds intact.

In the Soviet period, pastila was produced using an industrially optimised technology. According to William Pokhlyobkin, this Soviet-style pastila does not depend on the unique properties of the peasant stove and is markedly inferior to its homemade predecessors. It was ultimately eclipsed in popularity by zefir, which is made from similar ingredients but with whipped egg whites and gelling agents.

In the 2010s, traditional pastila is regaining its popularity, with the Kolomna and especially Belyov versions widely available commercially.

== Production in Kolomna ==
Kolomna claims to be the birthplace of original "white-foam" pastila and maintains a museum and a museum factory dedicated to the history and traditions of pastila production. The museum occupies a merchant house dating from ca. 1800, while the museum factory is located in a historical factory building. Rzhev and Belyov used to be known as other important centres of production. Kolomna pastila has been hand-made from apples for more than three hundred years. The process included whipping apple puree with egg whites and drying the paste in a stove. The finished product could be stored for many years. In 1735 the first pastila factory (pastilnaya) was set up. The pastila recipes and the product itself were forgotten after the Russian Revolution.

In 2008, during the European skating championship in Kolomna, the project "History with flavor" was implemented, which resulted in the revival of the Kolomna pastila production process. The forsaken symbol of Kolomna was regained with the opening of the pastila factory and the museum that followed.

The museum was set up in a historical building in the old part of the city. In the building next to it one can find the factory itself. During the theatrical performance that accompanies excursion, visitors are offered a number of unique sorts of pastila. There is also another museum where tourists can both listen to the story of pastila and buy a box of the dessert.

== See also ==
- List of Russian desserts
- Pestil
