= Khrushchev dough =

Type of bread dough

- Type: Dough
- Main ingredients: Flour

Khrushchev dough (Russian: хрущёвское тесто, romanized: khrushchevskoe testo) was a type of dough in the Soviet Union. It was the result of introducing flour rationing after a crop failure, which led to food irregularities in 1963, under Nikita Khrushchev. Products made from Khrushchev dough were called Khrushchev loaves or Khrushchev pies. "Khrushchev pie" was made by extracting the pulp out of a loaf of wheat bread, injecting a filling, and baking it in an oven. In 1963–1964, that pie became common on New Year tables. The color of the Khrushchev loaves in Leningrad was nearly blue. In some recipes from Runet, the dough was supposed to be long-lasting.

== See also ==
- Mikoyan cutlet
