= Kompot =

Fruit beverage

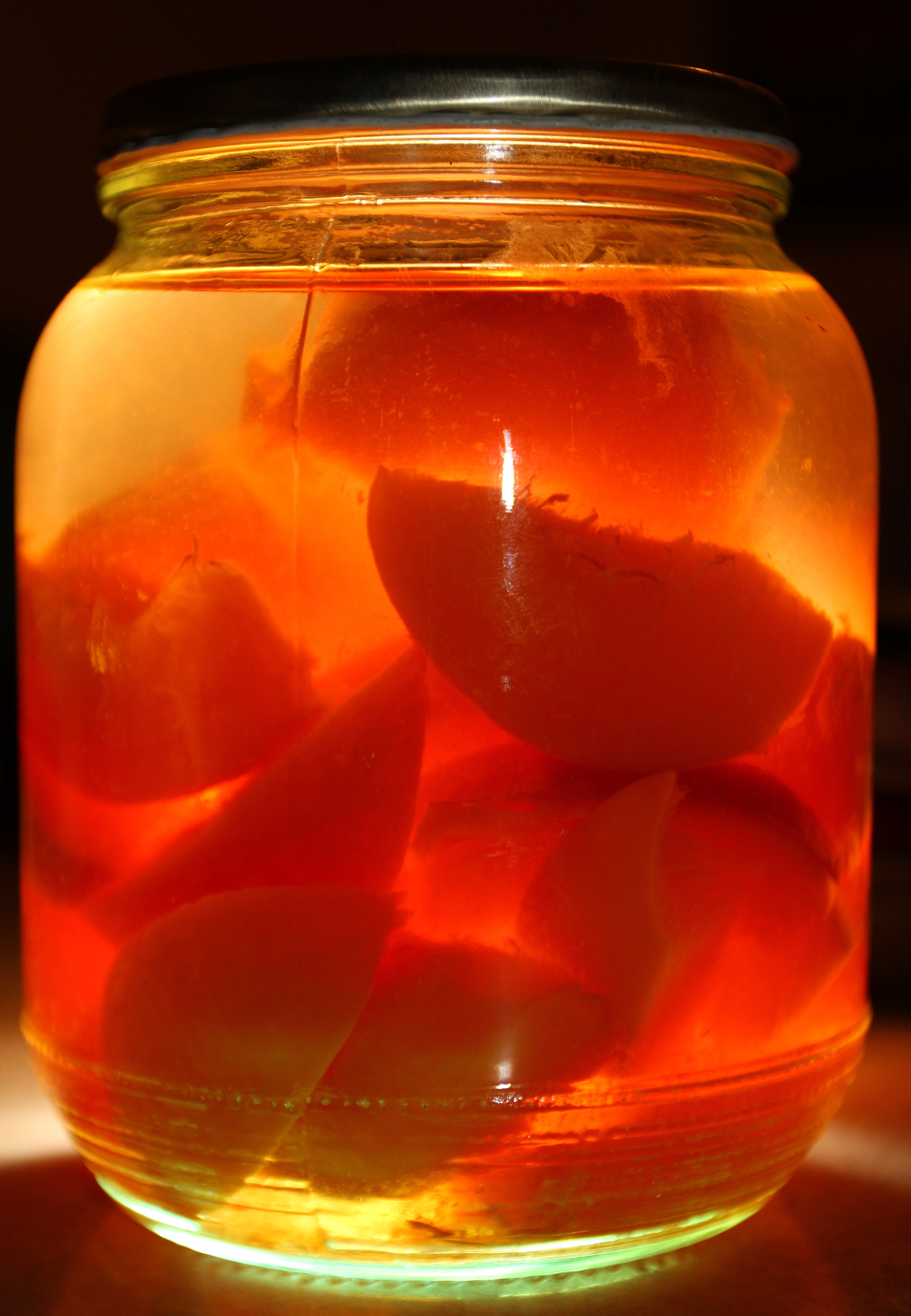
- Traditional peach kompot
- Alternative names: Compot
- Type: Preserved food or drink
- Course: Dinner or celebration
- Region or state: Primarily Central, Eastern, Southern Europe, the Balkans and the Caucasus
- Serving temperature: Hot, cold, or at room temperature
- Main ingredients: Water, sugar, various fruits

Kompot or compot, as prepared in Europe and West Asia, refers to boiled fruits (typically fresh or dried) served either as a drink or a dessert depending on the region. When served as a dessert, it is essentially identical to the French compote, which is where the term "kompot" originates from.

As a drink, kompot is a sweet, non-alcoholic beverage that may be served hot or cold, depending on tradition and season. It is created by cooking fruit such as strawberries, apricots, peaches, apples, raspberries, rhubarb, plums, or sour cherries in a large volume of water, often together with sugar, honey, or raisins as additional sweeteners. Sometimes different spices, such as vanilla or cinnamon, are added for additional flavour, especially in the winter, when kompot is usually served hot. Kompot is popular in Central and Eastern European countries, as well as in the Caucasus.

Kompot is part of the cuisine of many countries in Central, Eastern, and Southern Europe, as well as in the Middle East and West Asia. It is known by a variety of names in these countries, such as kompot in Czech and Polish, компот (kompot) in Russian and Bulgarian, компот (kompot) in Ukrainian, kompót in Slovak and Hungarian, kompotas in Lithuanian, komposto in Turkish, κομπόστα (kompósta) in Greek, կոմպոտ (kompot) in Armenian. Making kompot was a common way of preserving fruit for the winter in Caucasian, Southern and Eastern European countries; in 1885, Lucyna Ćwierczakiewiczowa wrote in a recipe book that kompot "preserved fruit so well it seemed fresh". Kompot is also known in many Central Asian countries.

The consumption of kompot has been declining since the 1980s. With the end of food preservation in many Southern and Eastern European countries, kompot has been supplanted by fruit juice, soft drinks and mineral water, while it is still a popular beverage in Georgia and Armenia.

== See also ==
- Agua fresca
- Fruit cocktail
- Fruit punch
- Kissel
- Mors
- Tong sui
