= Zefir (food) =

Type of soft confectionery

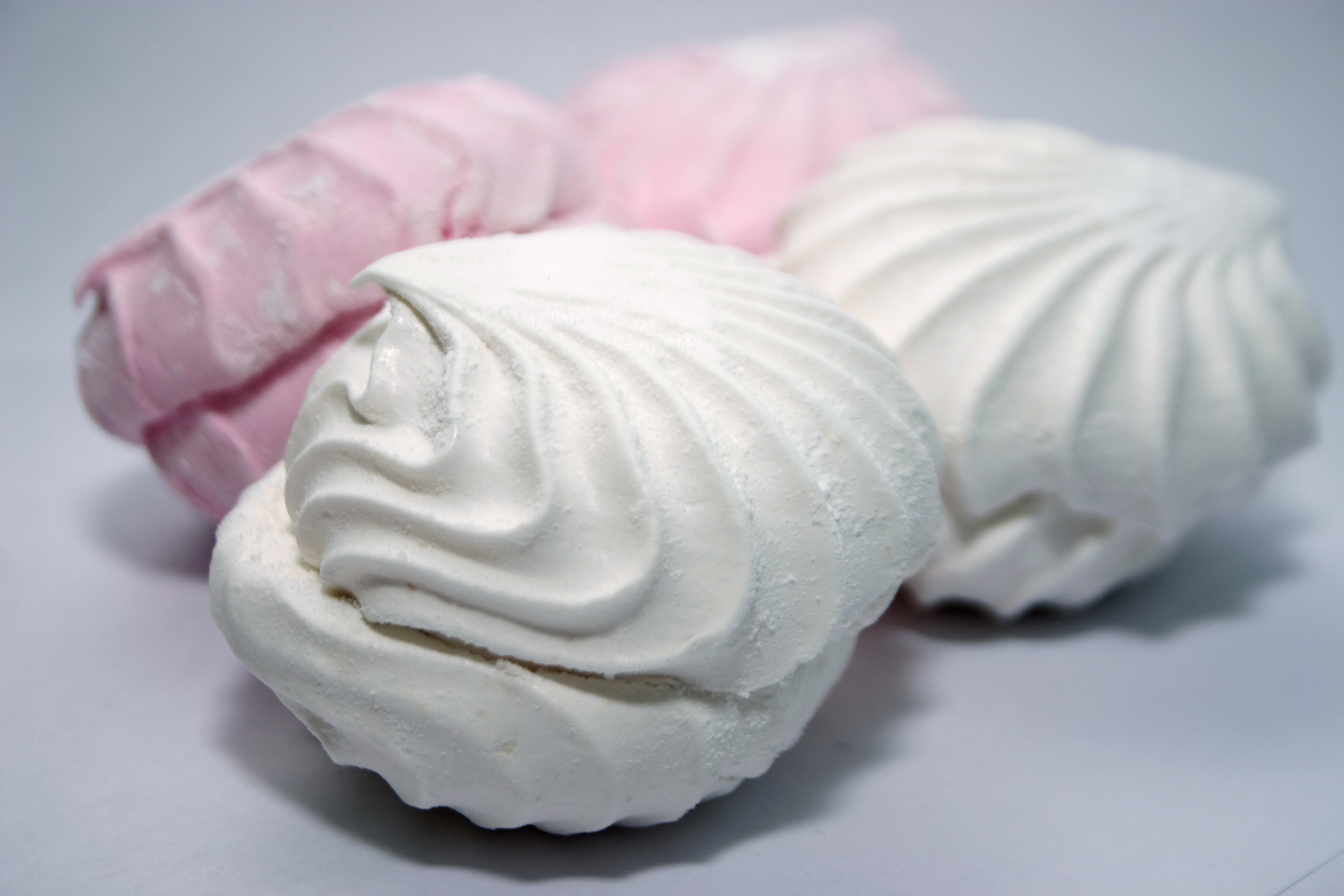
- The most common appearance of zefir
- Alternative names: Zephyr, zephir
- Type: Meringue
- Course: Confectionery
- Place of origin: Russia
- Serving temperature: Room temperature
- Main ingredients: fruit purée, egg whites, sugar
- Variations: Food coloring, filling
- Food energy (per 100 g serving): 329 kcal (1,380 kJ)
Nutritional value
(per 100 g serving)
- Protein: 0.7 g
- Fat: 0.1 g
- Carbohydrate: 81.5 g
- Glycemic index: 65 (medium)
- Similar dishes: Krembo

Zefir (also known as zephir or zephyr; Russian: зефир [zʲɪˈfʲir]) is a Russian confectionery, similar to marshmallows and meringue.

It is made by whipping fruit and berry purée (mostly apple puree) with sugar and egg whites with subsequent addition of a gelling agent like pectin, carrageenan, agar, or gelatine. It is produced in the countries of the former Soviet Union. The name given after the Greek god of the light west wind Zephyr symbolizes its delicate airy consistency.

== History ==
Zefir is derived from the traditional Russian pastila confectionery, known since the 14th century, but with added egg white foam and a gelling agent. An addition of unwhipped egg whites to the recipe originated in the town of Kolomna sometime during the 15th century, and in the 19th century, the zefir dessert most likely emerged in its modern form with whipped egg whites due to a French adaptation on the recipe that was later brought back to Russia.

== Form and consistency ==
The form typically resembles traditional meringue. However, in contrast to commercial-grade meringue, zefir is never crispy. In contrast to most chocolate-coated marshmallow-like confectioneries, zefirs normally come without layers of cookies/biscuits included.

Zefir is usually milky white, but also comes in rose-colored varieties for flavors containing berries and cherries, or may be colored green if it is flavored with apples. Zefir are also commonly sold with a thin, chocolate outer shell, and on occasion, contain berry-flavored jam on the inside.

Zefir is comparable in its consistency to marshmallows or krembo.

== Preparation ==
Zefir is traditionally made with a purée base, with sugar and egg whites being added before refrigeration. The mixture is subsequently combined with a heated thickening agent (such as agar or pectin), and then whisked (or in modern times, mixed with an electric mixer), until it is of a tacky consistency that can form peaks. It is then piped out of a starred tip and left to dry out. Although the outside will become more firm with a dry consistency, the inside will remain fluffy and sticky.

== Gallery ==
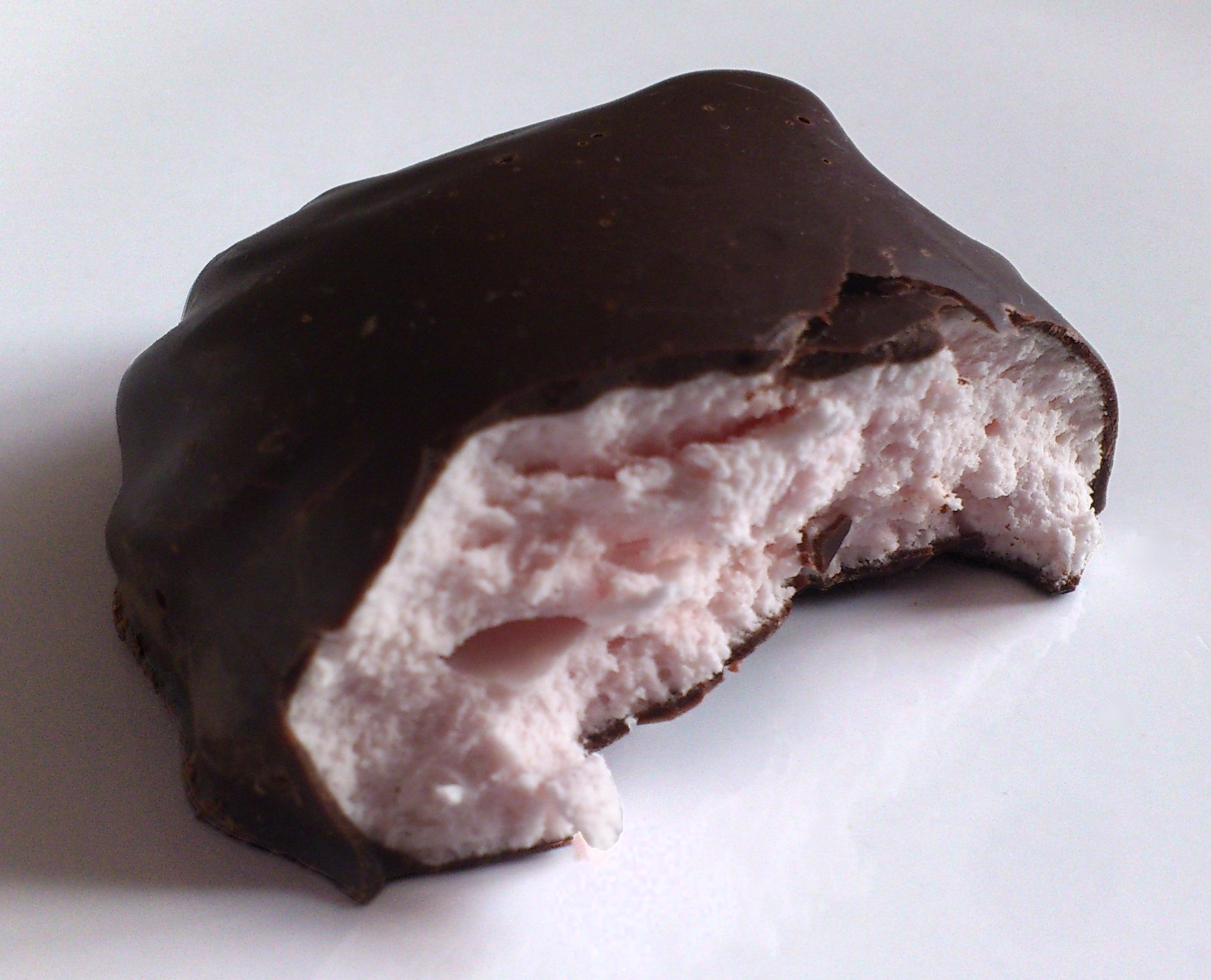
A chocolate-coated zefir

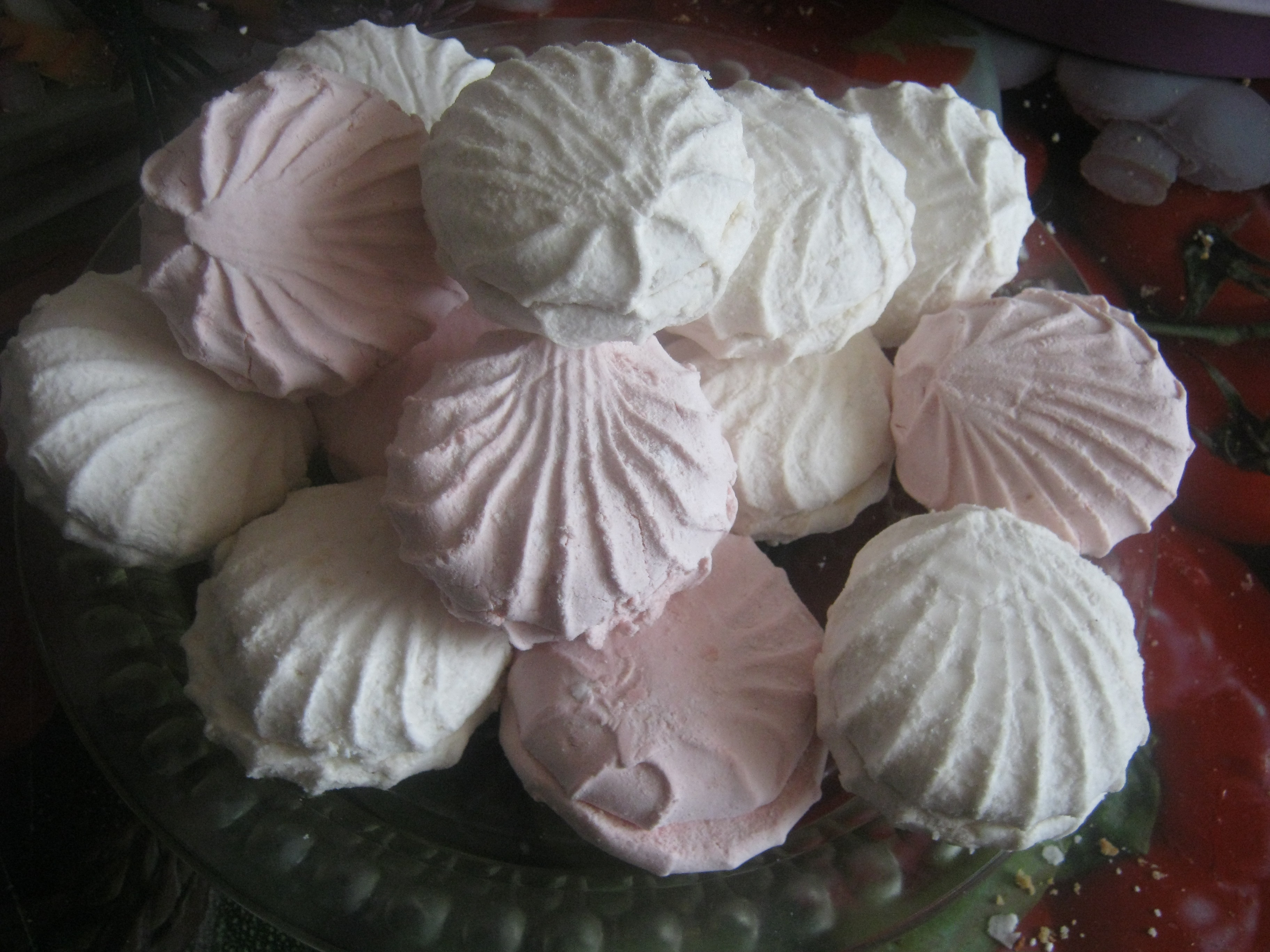
Clamshell design with mixture of pink and white zefir

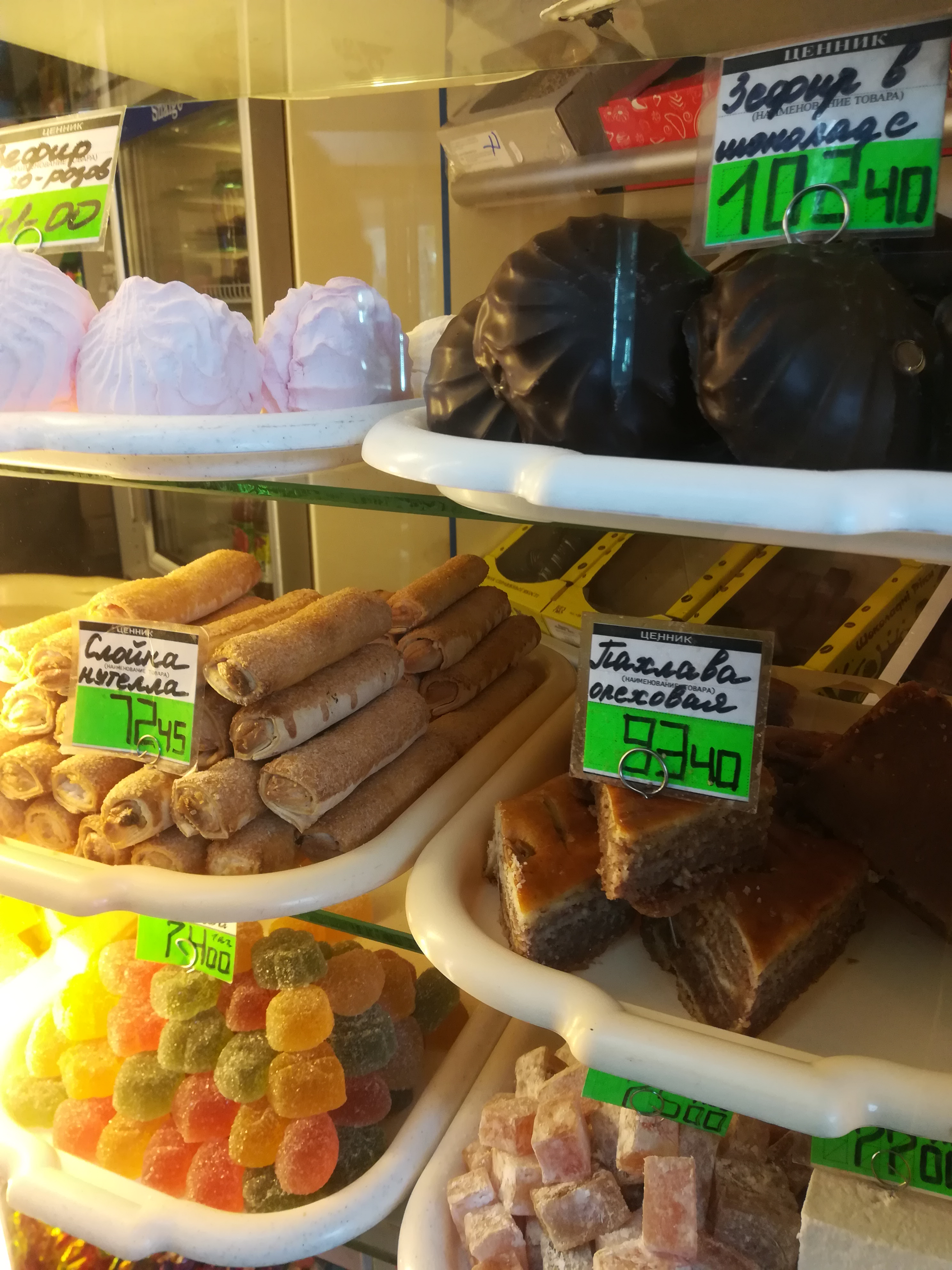
Zefir (top shelf) on sale at store in Kharkiv

== See also ==
- Nougat
- List of chocolate-covered foods
- List of Russian desserts

== Sources ==
- Sundaram, Susmita (28 October 2013). "zephyr (zefir)". Encyclopaedia of Contemporary Russian. Routledge. p. 688. ISBN 978-1-136-78786-7.
