= Pyshka =

Russian doughnut

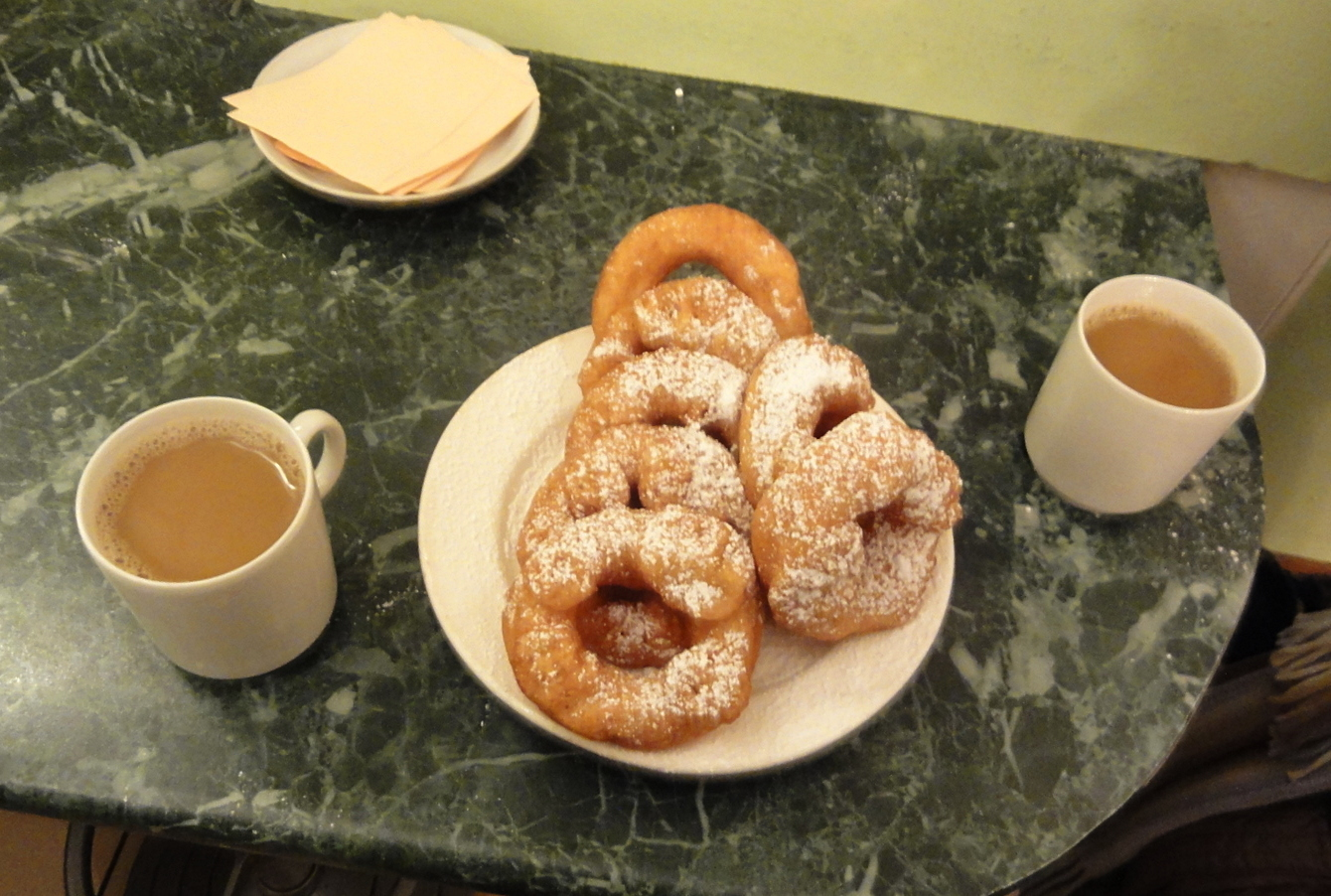
- Ring-shaped pyshki, Saint Petersburg
- Type: doughnut

Pyshka or ponchik (Russian: пышка, pl. pyshki пышки; пончик, pl. ponchiki пончики) is a Russian variety of doughnut.

== Types ==
Pyshki are either ring-shaped or without a hole.

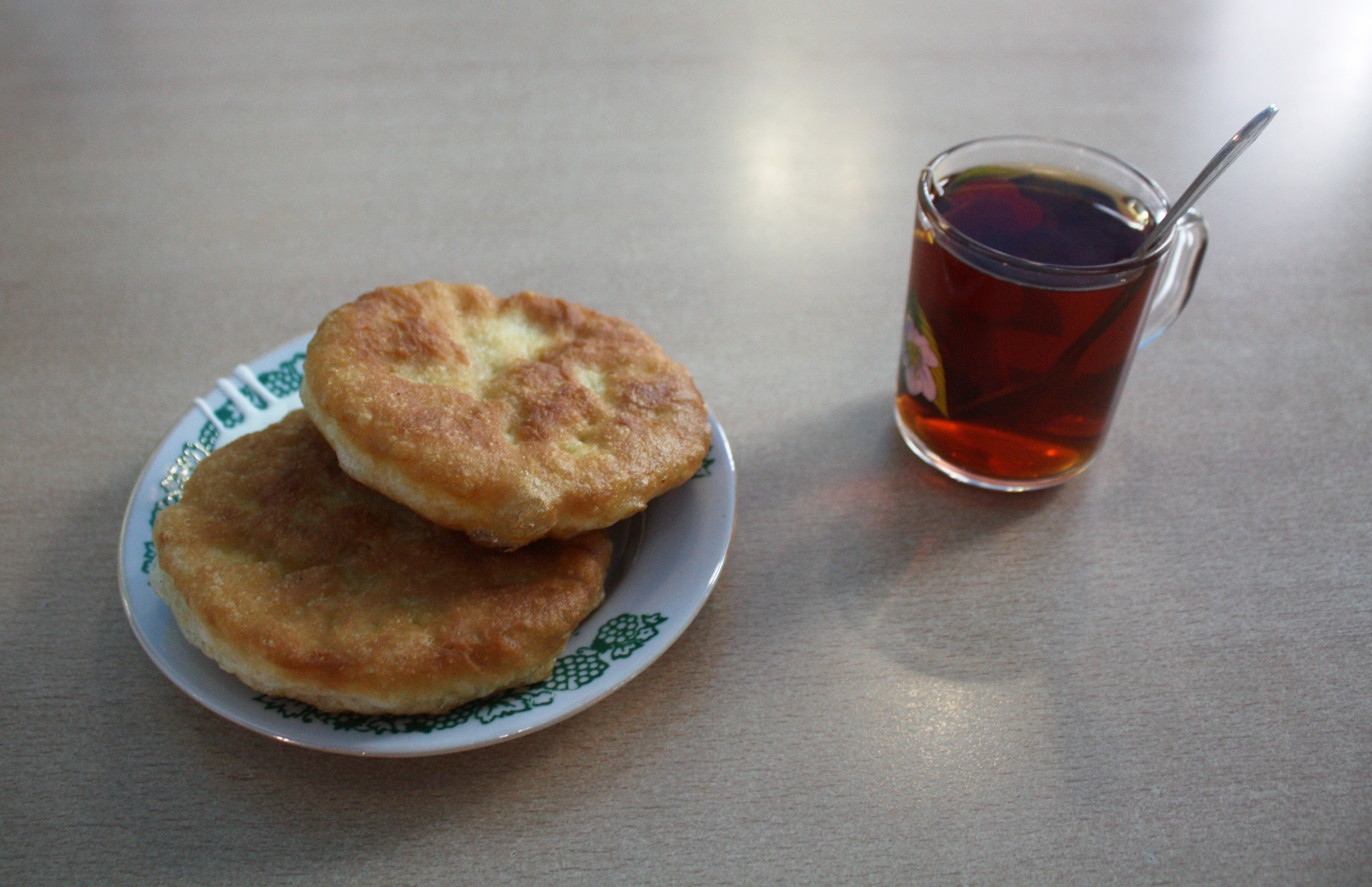
Pyshki without a hole, Novosibirsk pyshki cafe

== Regional name variations ==
In Saint Petersburg and Novosibirsk, the dish is called "pyshka" and the cafe is called "pyshechnaya". In Moscow, it is called "ponchik", the doughnut eatery is called "ponchikovaya".

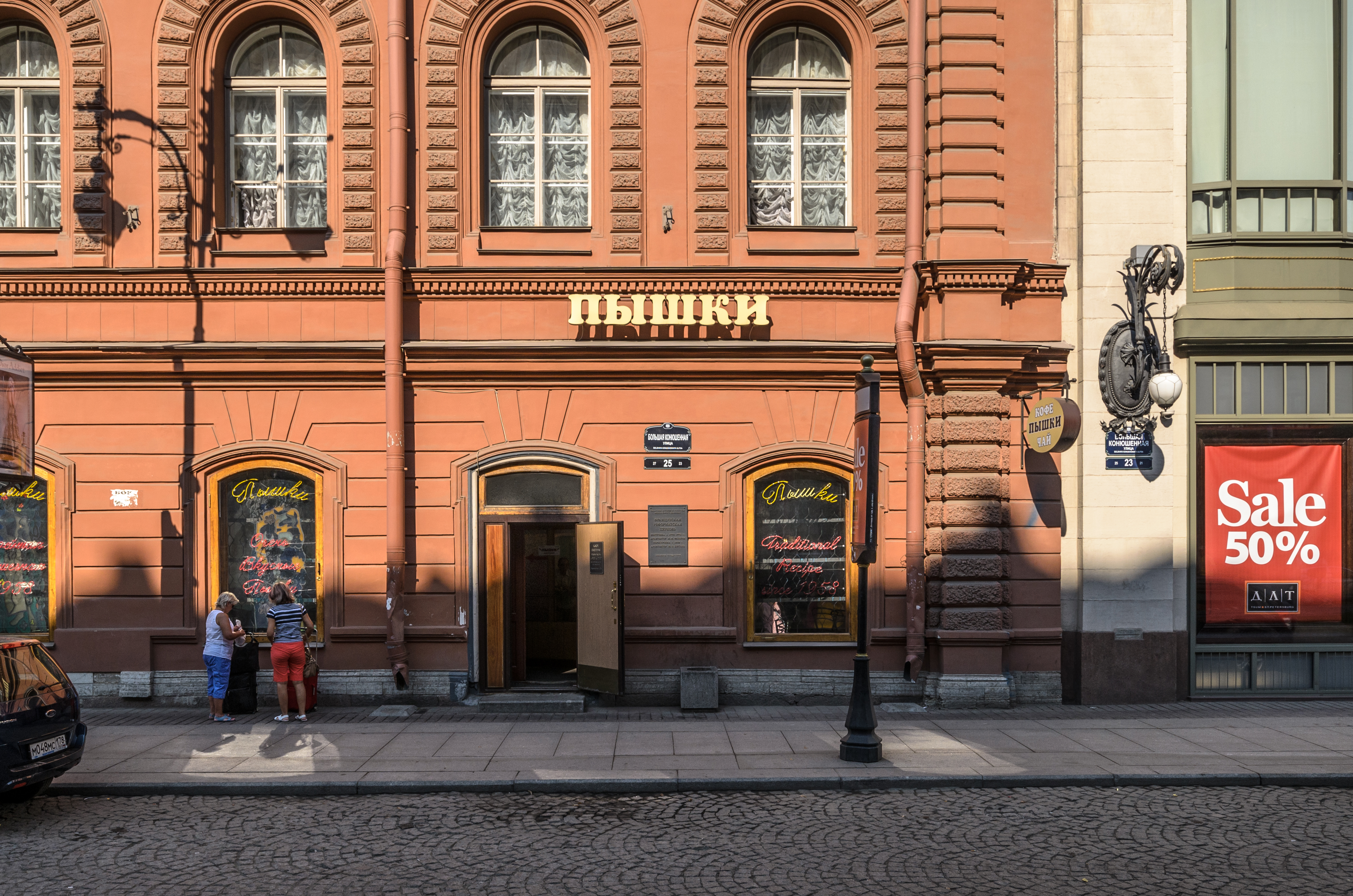
Pyshechnaya, Bolshaya Konushennaya Street, Saint Petersburg, founded in the 1960s

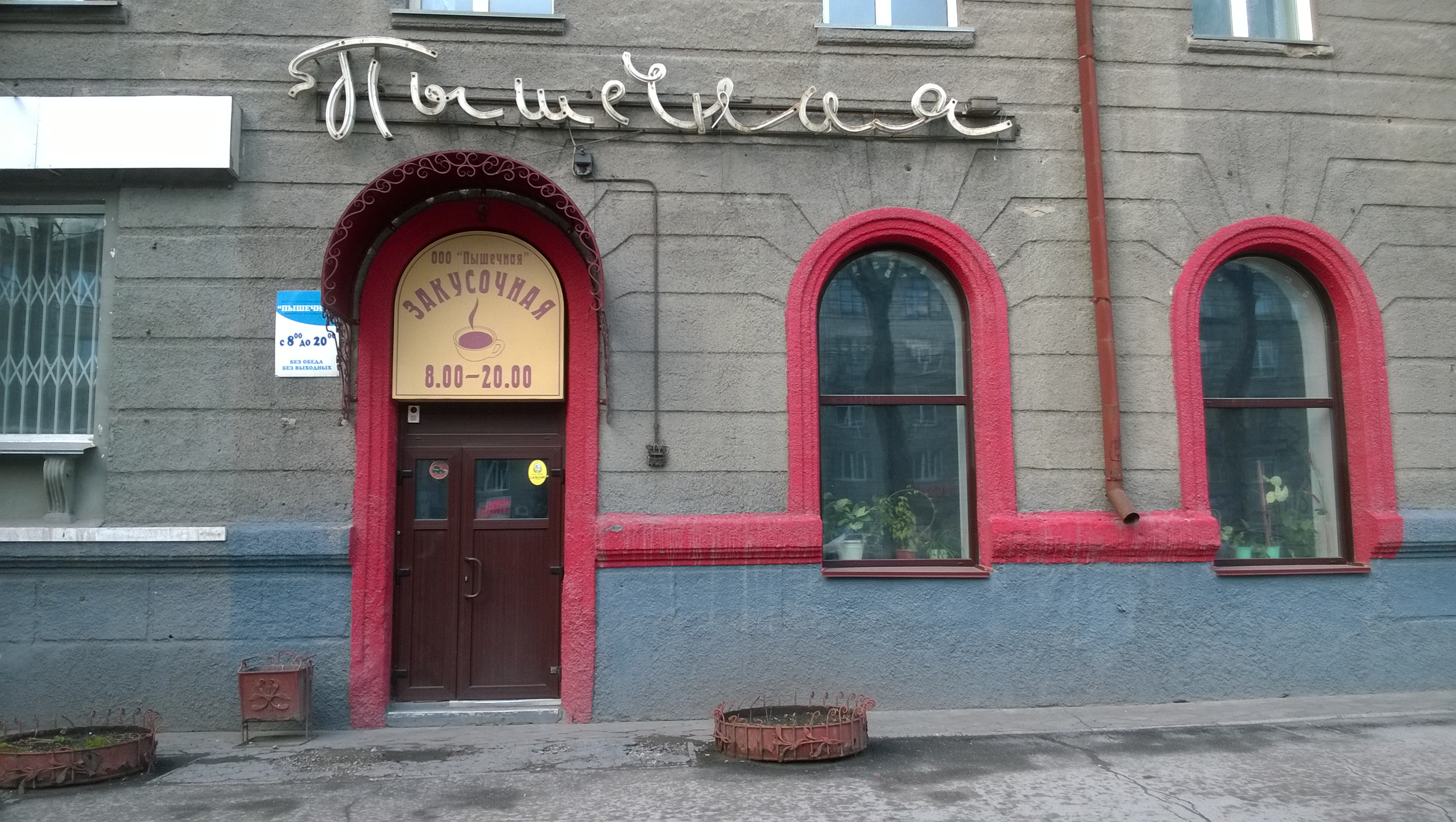
Novosibirsk Pyshechnaya, Leninsky City District, opened in the mid-twentieth century
