= Kinuski =

Sweet toffee-like dessert

Russian candy, kinuski
- Type: Confectionery
- Course: Dessert
- Place of origin: Russia
- Main ingredients: Cream, sugar

Russian candy (Finnish: kinuski; from Russian: тянучки tyanuchki (for stretchy, "pull-y", kinds of toffee)) is a very sweet toffee-like dessert made by carefully heating equal amounts of milk or cream and sugar. It is a traditional dessert sauce in Nordic countries. Karl Fazer brought the first Russian candy recipe to Finland from St. Petersburg.

== See also ==
- Russian cuisine – Culinary traditions of Russia
- Dulce de leche – Confection from Latin America
