= List of Intangible Cultural Heritage elements in Kazakhstan =

Location of Kazakhstan

The United Nations Educational, Scientific and Cultural Organization (UNESCO) defines intangible cultural heritage elements as non-physical traditions and practices performed by a people. As part of a country's cultural heritage, they include celebrations, festivals, performances, oral traditions, music, and the making of handicrafts. The term intangible cultural heritage is formally established by the Convention for the Safeguarding of the Intangible Cultural Heritage, which was drafted in 2003 and took effect in 2006. The inscription of new heritage elements on UNESCO's Intangible Cultural Heritage Lists for protection and safeguarding is determined by the Intergovernmental Committee for the Safeguarding of Intangible Cultural Heritage, an organization established by the Convention. Kazakhstan ratified the Convention on 28 December 2011. It has served on the Intangible Cultural Heritage Committee from 2018 to 2022.

National lists are required by the Convention for the further nomination of elements to the UNESCO lists.

== Intangible Cultural Heritage of Humanity ==
UNESCO's Intangible Cultural Heritage of Humanity consists of three lists: the Representative List of the Intangible Cultural Heritage of Humanity, the List of Intangible Cultural Heritage in Need of Urgent Safeguarding, and the Register of Good Safeguarding Practices. Kazakhstan only has elements inscribed on the Representative List.

† Transnational element

=== Representative List ===
This list aims to represent the intangible cultural heritage of Kazakhstan worldwide and bring awareness to its significance.

Intangible Cultural Heritage elements recognized by UNESCO
Name	Media	Year	No.	Description
Kazakh traditional art of Dombra Kuy	A wooden Kazakh Dombra	2014	00996	
Aitysh/Aitys, art of improvisation † (Note: Shared with Kyrgyzstan)	A silver coin displaying an Aitysh competition.	2015	00997	
Flatbread making and sharing culture: Lavash, Katyrma, Jupka, Yufka † (Note: Shared with Azerbaijan, Iran, Kyrgyzstan, and Turkey.)	Pieces of lavash bread compiled in a wooden serving basket.	2016	01181	
Kuresi in Kazakhstan		2016	01085	
Kazakh traditional Assyk games		2017	01086	
Traditional spring festive rites of the Kazakh horse breeders		2018	01402	
Heritage of Dede Qorqud/Korkyt Ata/Dede Korkut, epic culture, folk tales and music † (Note: Shared with Azerbaijan and Turkey.)		2018	01399	
Traditional intelligence and strategy game: Togyzqumalaq, Toguz Korgool, Mangala/Göçürme † (Note: Shared with Kyrgyzstan and Turkey.)		2020	01597	
Falconry, a living human heritage † (Note: Shared with Austria, Belgium, Croatia, Czechia, France, Germany, Hungary, Ireland, Italy, South Korea, Kyrgyzstan, Mongolia, Morocco, Netherlands, Pakistan, Poland, Portugal, Qatar, United Arab Emirates, Saudi Arabia, Slovakia, Spain, and Syria.)	An illustration of a Eurasian goshawk	2021	01708	
Telling tradition of Nasreddin Hodja/ Molla Nesreddin/ Molla Ependi/ Apendi/ Afendi Kozhanasyr Anecdotes † (Note: Shared with Azerbaijan, Kyrgyzstan, Tajikistan, Turkey, Turkmenistan, and Uzbekistan.)	A 17th-century miniature of Nasruddin	2022	01705	
Orteke, traditional performing art in Kazakhstan: dance, puppet and music		2022	01878	
Nawrouz, Novruz, Nowrouz, Nowrouz, Nawrouz, Nauryz, Nooruz, Nowruz, Navruz, Nevruz, Nowruz, Navruz † (Note: Shared with Afghanistan, Azerbaijan, India, Iran, Iraq, Kyrgyzstan, Mongolia, Pakistan, Tajikistan, Turkey, Turkmenistan, and Uzbekistan.)	Girl with torch on mountainside	2024	02097	
Betashar, traditional wedding ritual		2024	01746	
Traditional knowledge and skills in making Kyrgyz, Kazakh and Karakalpak yurts (Turkic nomadic dwellings) † (Note: Shared with Kyrgyzstan and Uzbekistan.)	A Karakalpak bentwood type yurt inKarakalpakstan, Uzbekistan	2025	02284	

== See also ==
- List of World Heritage Sites in Kazakhstan
- Culture of Kazakhstan
- Tourism in Kazakhstan
