= Kazakhization =

Adoption of a Kazakh culture by a non-Kazakh population

Kazakhization or Kazakhisation (Kazakh: Қазақтандыру, romanized: Qazaqtandyru, pronounced [qɑ.zɑq.tɑn.dəˈrʊ]) refers to a series of policies and movements aimed at reviving and promoting Kazakh culture, language, and identity in Kazakhstan, especially following its independence from the Soviet Union.

In recent years, there has been a growing self-awareness among Kazakhs regarding their national identity, with discussions surrounding the Kazakh language, historical narratives, and issues of famine and genocide becoming prominent. This renewed interest is accompanied by an official language policy that influences identity construction among the Kazakh population. However, the Kazakhization process has encountered obstacles, such as the widespread use of foreign languages instead of the state language by many citizens, and the complex demographic makeup of the country, which includes a large Russian-speaking population.

== History ==
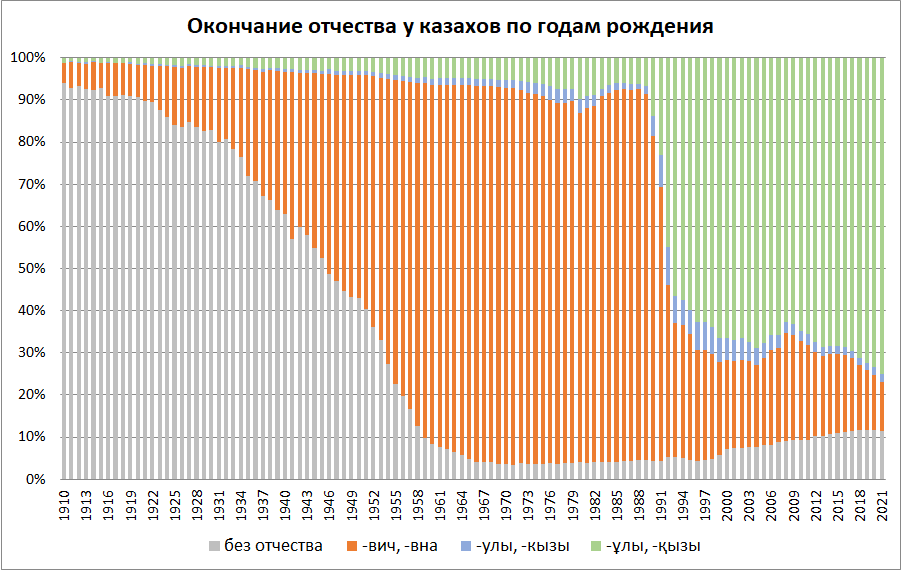
Patronymic ending of kazakhs by birth year, %, %

The legacy of the Soviet era has significantly shaped the ethnic landscape of Kazakhstan, particularly through the process of Russification. Following the collapse of the Soviet Union in 1991, the identity in Kazakhstan has been primarily divided along ethnic lines, notably between ethnic Kazakhs and Russians, which reflects the historical narrative and policies of the Soviet regime. The Soviet era witnessed a drastic decline in the number of ethnic Kazakhs inhabiting their traditional territories during the 1920s and 1930s, which has left a lasting impact on the demographics and cultural perceptions within the country.

The aim of Kazakhization has been partly to restore the Kazakh language's status, which had been diminished during Soviet rule. This effort has included the promotion of Kazakh as the primary language of instruction in educational institutions, which reflects a deliberate action to reassert Kazakh identity and heritage.

Kazakhstan's language policy balances Kazakhization with interethnic harmony by promoting both Kazakh and Russian.

== Cultural implications ==
Most prestigious languages in Kazakhstan
1. Kazakh & English (64.0%)
2. English & Russian (18.0%)
3. Kazakh (11.0%)
4. English (4.00%)
5. Russian (3.00%)

Kazakhization policies in education and media have reshaped Kazakhstan's cultural landscape, aiming to revive the Kazakh language and identity after its marginalization during the Soviet era. This has fostered a civic understanding of national identity that is increasingly centered around the Kazakh people, while simultaneously impacting the ethnic identity of other groups, notably ethnic Russians, within the country.

As the Kazakh language becomes more prevalent in educational institutions and media, it has contributed to a growing sense of Kazakh nationalism, promoting greater cultural integration among ethnic Kazakhs while creating some tensions with ethnic Russians and other minority groups. The dual language policy, which encourages both Kazakh and Russian languages, aims to bridge ethnic divides and foster unity. However, the emphasis on Kazakh has led to feelings of exclusion among non-Kazakh speakers, particularly in regions that have seen demographic shifts favoring ethnic Kazakhs.

== See also ==
- Russification
- Sinicization
- Turkification
- Ukrainization
- Korenizatsiya
- Ethnic nationalism
- Indigenization
- Demographics of Kazakhstan
- Russians in Kazakhstan
