= Aiyr-kalpak =

White felt hat from Kazakhstan

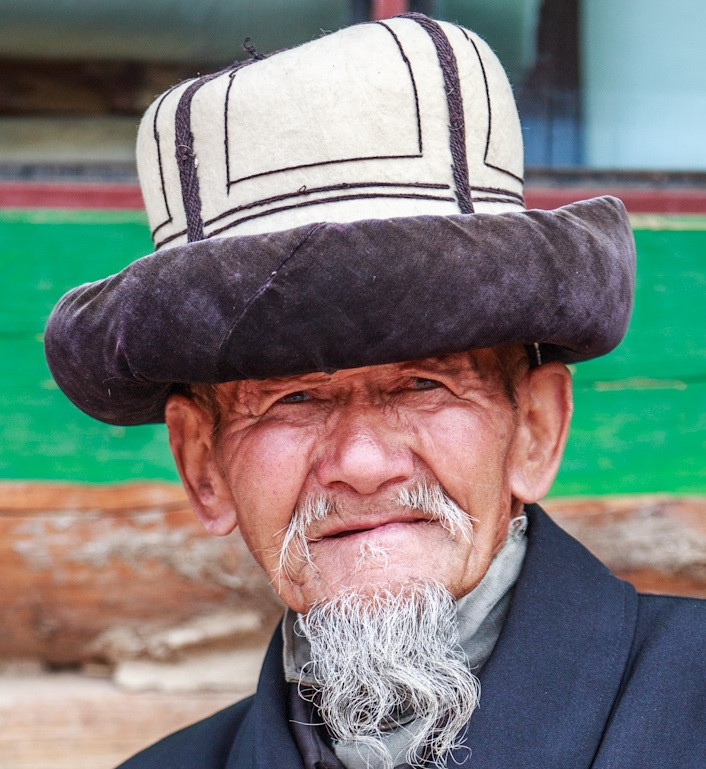
A Kazakh man wears a kalpak

An Aiyr-kalpak (Kazakh: Айыр қалпақ) or Murak is a white felt hat that is traditionally worn by Kazakh men. It is a felt headdress with slits on the brim, where "aiyr" means "forked" or "with a slit," and "kalpak" means "hat." One side symbolizes wealth, the other — power. Such headwear was sewn from expensive fabrics and adorned with embroidery using gold or silver threads. The aiyr-kalpak was made of silk, brocade threads, and sometimes velvet. In the second half of the 19th century, the round kalpak became widespread. Its upturned brim was finished with dark or light fabric, and a short tassel was attached to the top with thin threads for decoration. The headwear consists of two identical parts, and the lower part is folded out, forming a wide brim with slits. A pointed cap made of white felt is called an ak-kalpak, while one with slits on the brim and a flat crown is called an aiyr-kalpak.

== Kyzai-kalpak ==
The Kazakhs of the Ili Prefecture in China wear the aiyr-kalpak and ak-kalpak significantly more often than the Kazakhs of Kazakhstan. Various types of felt kalpaks have been well preserved here. One of them is the kyzai-kalpak. It received its name from a clan of the Middle Juz, as it was specifically members of the Kyzai clan who traditionally wore this headwear. The kyzai-kalpak has a distinct manufacturing technology. For it, white wool from the neck of a young ram is used, which is meticulously cleaned, washed, dried, spun, and formed into a round cone of the required thickness. Then the wool is wrapped around a mold, turned into felt, strengthened with a special stick, sprinkled with white rock powder, and smoothed by hand. After this, the felt is steamed, and the center of the kalpak is divided into four parts for final shaping

The Legend of the Kyzai-Kalpak's Origin:

Kyzai-ana is one of the most respected women among the Kazakh people. Her birth name was Kunbike. Her father was Baidibek bi Karashauly from the Middle Juz, and her mother was Domalak ana, the daughter of Maktym aga, who was the imam of the Bab-Arab mosque in Turkestan. Thus, her nobility was inherited from her parents. Her wisdom and foresight amazed everyone.

At the age of 17, she married Shagyr batyr, the son of Zhandaulet bi, and became the mother of four children: Itemgen, Menis, Begimbet, and Derbis. Later, their descendants came to be called the Kyzai. During the years of the great calamity "Aktaban Shubyrindy, Alkakol Sulama" ("The Great Retreat" or "The Years of Barefooted Flight"), they lived for a time on the banks of the Syr Darya, and later, by the order of Abylai Khan, migrated to the east. Today, there are over 700,000 Kyzai people living in the Ili region.

When Kyzai-ana was forty years old, she gathered her four sons — Itemgen, Menis, Begimbet, and Derbis — and said to them:

"...After the fall of two identical trees (referring to their husbands, Shagyr and Toktarkozha), the four of you remain at the end. Thank the Creator for this! There is a saying: 'Common roots do not divide, a common trunk does not disappear.' You share a common lineage and a common root. If you are united like a fist, you will grow and strengthen. Like four trees, you will become strong. Then success will come, and everything will gather around you!"

The venerable mother continued:

"To symbolize your unbreakable unity, I have sewn four white kalpaks for you from the dense wool of white sheep. This signifies that I have four children. I have united the four peaks of these kalpaks so that you may always be together and your minds may be one. On the top, I have attached seven coral tassels so that no one may envy you, and enemies may retreat. The kalpaks are made so that they can be expanded or narrowed, so that you may always be magnanimous to one another. The brim of the kalpaks is edged with black velvet so that a large and strong community may surround you. And the white color and pure wool are so that you may grow in the Alatau, by the spring of your ancestor Baidibek, and live purely, like snow, without stains or hardships..."

== In Literature ==
A poem by the famous kazakh poet and playwright Abdilda Tazhibayev, written in 1949: "Ak Kalpak" (White Kalpak)

Original

Басыма кидім ақ қалпақ
Оюлап шетін сырғызған
Менің де бетім жап-жалпақ,
Айырмам қайсы қырғыздан.
«Қоқи!» дей көрме, бикешжан,
Ақ қалпақсыз да өзіңмін,
Отынан ұшқын алып қал
Жалт еткен саған көзімнің.
Ақкөңіл жанмын, бар шыным,
Қырғызбен мені бірдей көр.
Тұтансын от боп ұшқыным,
Өшіріп алмай, үрлей бер!

English Translation

I put a white kalpak on my head,
With patterns traced along the brim.
My face is also broad and wide,
How do I differ from a Kyrgyz?
Do not look askance, my dear beauty,
Even without the white kalpak, I am yours.
Catch the spark from the fire
Of my eyes flashing toward you.
I am a pure-hearted soul, in all truth,
See me as one with the Kyrgyz.
Let my spark ignite into a flame,
Do not extinguish it, but fan the fire!

A poem by Syrbai Maulenov, a kazakh poet, writer, and WWII veteran: "With a White Kalpak on His Head"

Original

Көгінде күн күркіреп,
Алды үйіріп даланы.
Жаңбырлы бұлт сіркіреп,
Шайып өтті ауаны.
Көктем желі шарлаған
Қыс көйлегін сыпырды.
Қызғалдақтар аумаған,
Қызыл тулар сықылды.
Ақты өзен алға ұзап,
Ақ тал қалмай шашында,
Алатау тұр жалғыз-ақ,
Ақ қалпағы басында.

English Translation

Thunder rumbled in the sky,
Enveloping the steppe before it.
Rain clouds sprinkled down,
Washing clean the air.
The roaming spring wind
Stripped away winter’s dress.
The tulips stood indistinguishable
From red flags waving.
The river flowed far ahead,
No white frost remained on the branches,
Only the Alatau stands alone,
With a white kalpak on its head.

== See also ==
- Ak-kalpak
