= Culture of Kazakhstan =

Betashar ceremony

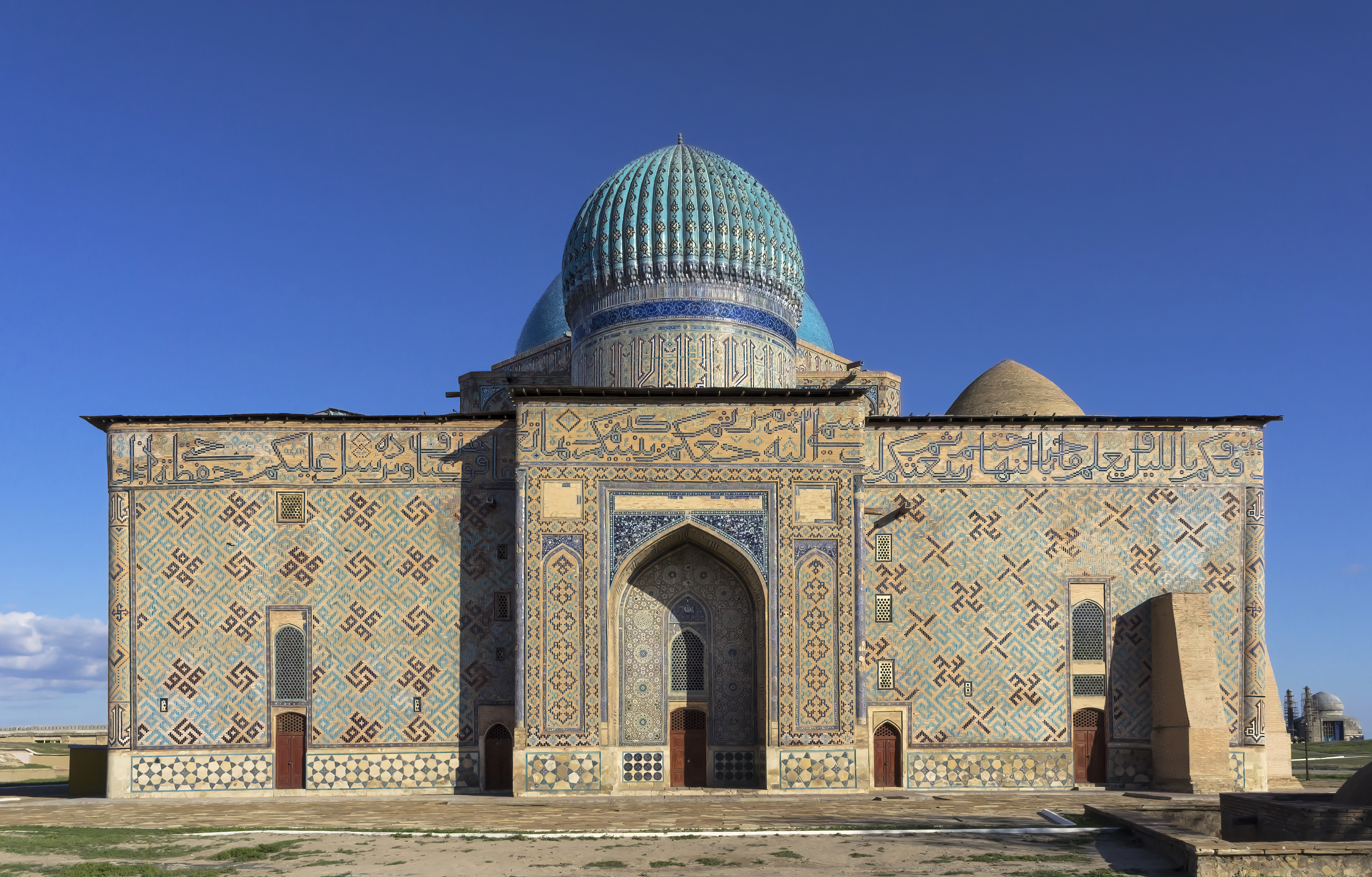
Yasawi mausoleum

Orteke puppet art

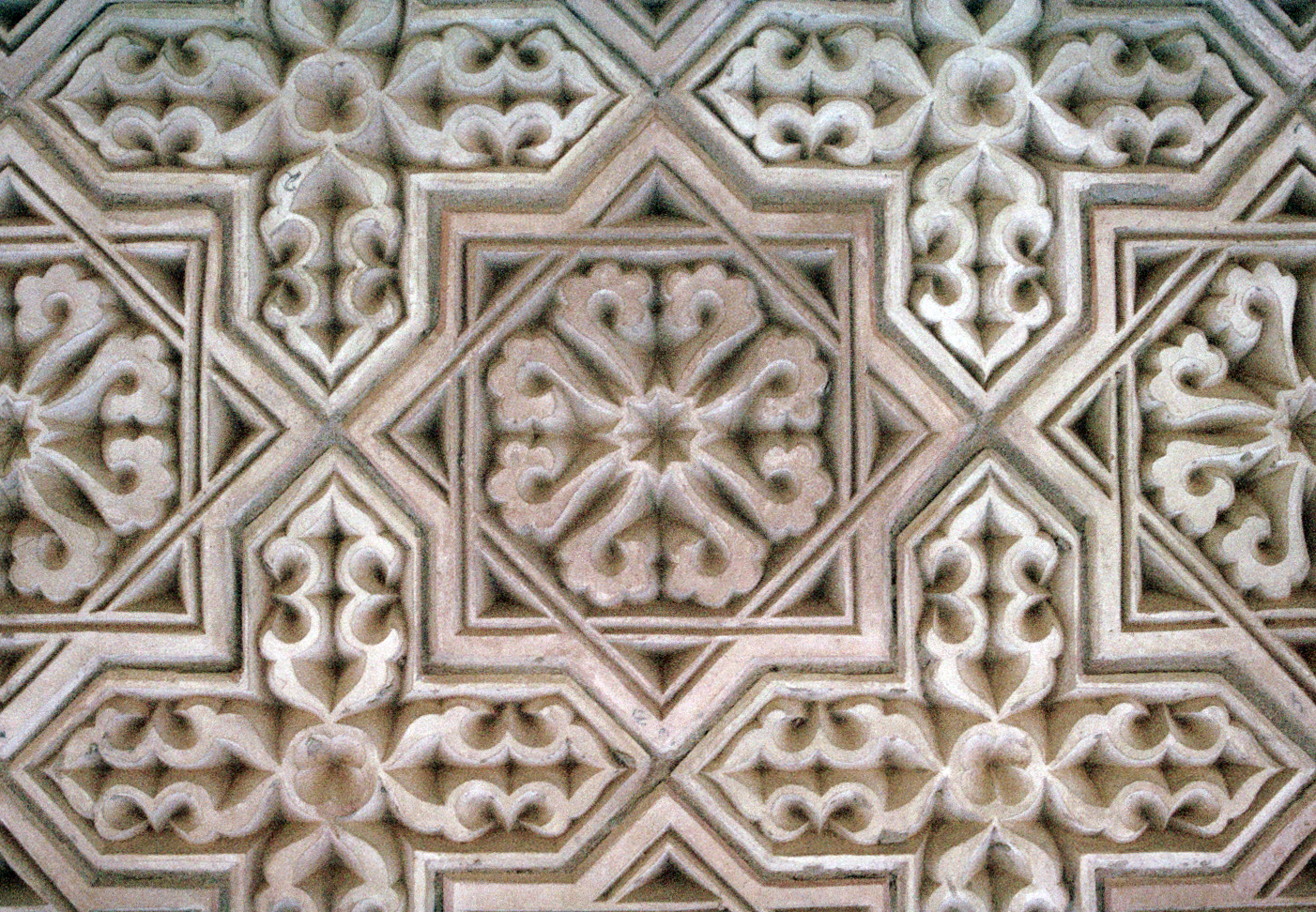
Kazakh ornament

Qyz Jibek opera

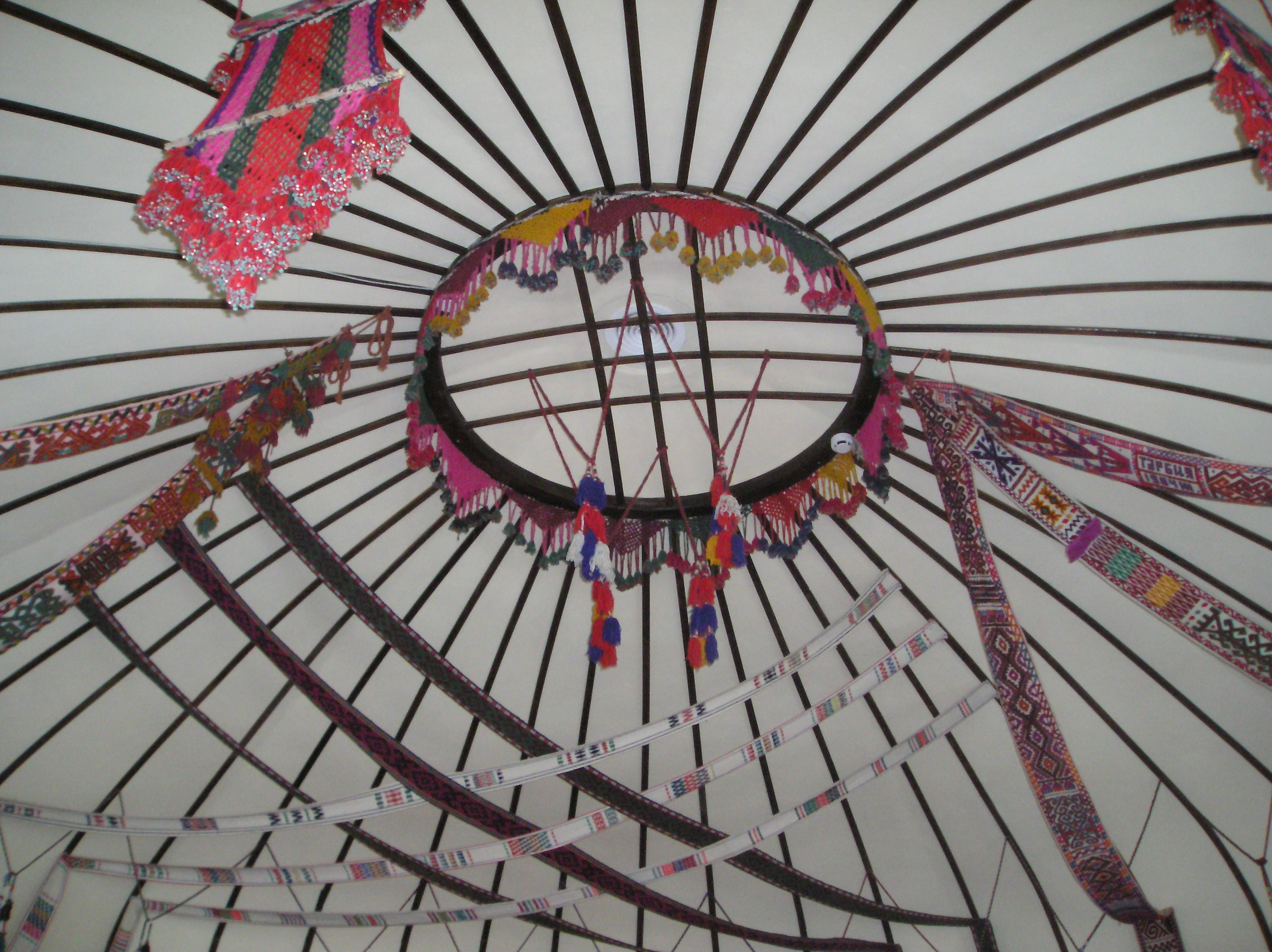
Shangyrak

Modern Kazakh culture is mainly characterized as a synthesis of Tengrian nomadic and Islamic and European elements. Nomadic elements are derived from predecessors, such as the Huns, First Turkic Khaganate, Golden Horde and Kazakh Khanate. Nomadism largely shaped its peculiar music, clothing, jewelry and oral literature. Kazakh culture also seems to be strongly influenced by the nomadic Scythians.

Because animal husbandry was central to the Kazakhs' traditional lifestyle, most of their nomadic practices and customs relate in some way to livestock. Traditional curses and blessings invoked disease or fertility among animals, and good manners required that a person ask first about the health of a man's livestock when greeting him and only afterward inquire about the human aspects of his life.

The traditional Kazakh dwelling is the yurt, a tent consisting of a flexible framework of willow wood covered with varying thicknesses of felt. The open top permits smoke from the central hearth to escape; temperature and draft can be controlled by a flap that increases or decreases the size of the opening. A properly constructed yurt can be cooled in summer and warmed in winter, and it can be disassembled or set up in less than an hour. The interior of the yurt has ritual significance; the right side is generally reserved for men and the left for women. Yurts are also frequently used as a decorative motif in restaurants and other public buildings.

== Modern influences ==
Today's Kazakhstan is a modern culture, thriving in the post-Soviet era. The traditional Kazakh lifestyle has blended with influences from Western societies, as well as those from Kazakhstan's Russian and Chinese neighbors.

== Religion ==
Islam is the largest religion in Kazakhstan, followed by Russian Orthodox Christianity. Approximately 70% of the population is Muslim. The majority are Sunni of the Hanafi school, including ethnic Kazakhs, who constitute about 60% of the population, as well as by ethnic Uzbeks, Uighurs, and Tatars. Less than 25% of the population is Russian Orthodox, including ethnic Russians, Ukrainians, and Belarusians. Other religious groups include Judaism, the Baháʼí Faith, Hare Krishnas, Buddhism, and the Church of Jesus Christ of Latter-day Saints. There is also currently a revival of the traditional religion of Tengriism, which was the largest indigenous faith on the Kazakh steppe before the introduction of Islam.

== Cuisine ==
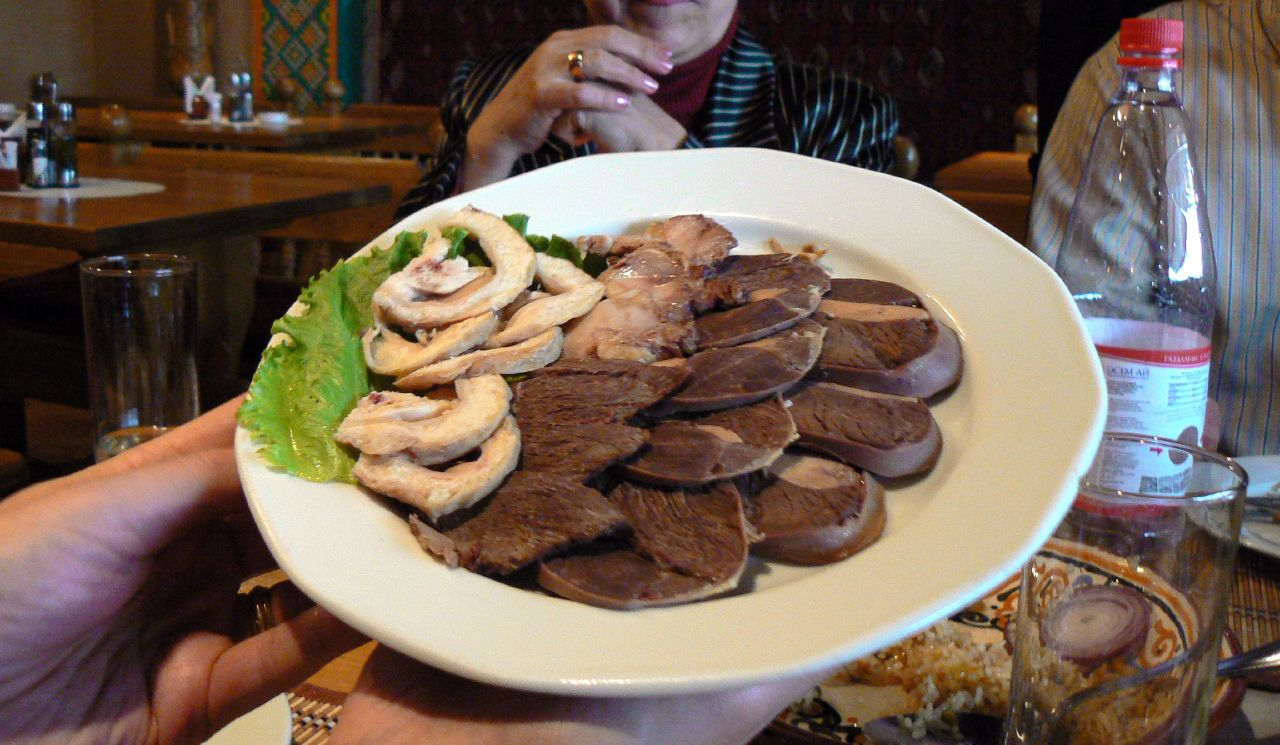
A platter of horse meat served traditionally as an appetizer.

Traditional Kazakh cuisine revolves around lamb and horse meat, as well as a variety of dairy milk products. For hundreds of years, Kazakhs were herders who raised fat-tailed sheep, Bactrian camels, and horses, relying on these animals for transportation, clothing, and food. The cooking techniques and major ingredients have been strongly influenced by the nation's nomadic way of life. For example, most cooking techniques are aimed at long-term preservation of food. There is a large practice of salting and drying meat so that it will last, and there is a preference for sour milk, as it is easier to save in a nomadic lifestyle.

Besbarmak, a dish consisting of boiled horse or lamb meat, is the most popular Kazakh dish. Besbarmak is usually eaten with a boiled pasta sheet, and a meat broth called shorpa, and is traditionally served in Kazakh bowls called kese. Other popular meat dishes are Qazı (which is a horse meat sausage that only the wealthy could afford), shuzhuk (horse meat sausages), kuyrdak (also spelled kuirdak, a dish made from roasted horse, sheep, or cow offal, such as heart, liver, kidneys, and other organs, diced and served with onions and peppers), and various horse delicacies, such as zhal (smoked lard from horse's neck) and zhaya (salted and smoked meat from horse's hip and hind leg). Pilaf (palaw) is the most common Kazakh rice dish, with vegetables (carrots, onions, and/or garlic) and chunks of meat. The national drinks are kumys (fermented mare's milk) and tea.

== Traditions ==
Kazakhs are known for their hospitality, and many Kazakh traditions are based on this ethnic feature. Some traditions have been lost, but some have been rediscovered. Below are some of the traditions that continue to play a role in the modern Kazakh society:

Konakasy (Kazakh: қонақасы; "konak" - guest, "as" - food) - a tradition to welcome a guest and make his stay as enjoyable as one can by providing food, lodge, entertainment. Depending on the circumstances under which a guest had come from, he is either called "arnayy konak" (Kazakh: арнайы қонақ) - a specially invited guest, "kudayy konak" (Kazakh: құдайы қонақ) - a casual traveller, or "kydyrma konak" (Kazakh: қыдырма қонақ) - an unexpected visitor.

Korimdik (Kazakh: көрімдік; "koru" - to see) - a tradition of presenting a person with a gift to congratulate him on a gain in his life. The custom is called korimdik, if a gain is related to a person or an animal (e.g. seeing a person's daughter-in-law or a newborn animal for the first time), and baygazy (Kazakh: байғазы), if the gain is material.

Shashu (Kazakh: шашу - to scatter) - a tradition to shower heroes of an occasion with sweets during some festivity. Kazakhs believe that collected delights bring luck.

Bata (Kazakh: бата - blessing) - a form of poetic art, typically given by the most respected or the eldest person to express gratitude for the provided hospitality, give blessing to a person who is about to enter a new phase in life, go through a challenging experience or travel.

Tusau kesu (Kazakh: тұсау кесу - to cut ties) - a tradition to celebrate the first attempts of a child to walk. The legs of a child are tied with a string of white and black colors symbolizing the good and the bad in life. The tie is then cut by a female relative who is energetic and lively in nature, so that the child acquires her qualities. After the string has been cut, it is burnt.

Kyz uzatu (Kazakh: қыз ұзату) - the first wedding party organized by the parents of a bride. The literal translation is "to see off a daughter".

Betashar (Kazakh: беташар; "bet" - face, "ashu" - to open) - the custom (often done at the wedding) to lift a veil from the face of a bride. Today а mullah is invited to perform an improvised song, in which he mentions the relatives of the groom. The bride has to bow each time she hears the mullah sing a name. After the song, the mother of the groom lifts the veil.

Shildehana (Kazakh: шілдехана) - celebration of a birth of a child.

Suinshi (Kazakh: сүйінші) - a tradition to give present to someone who has brought good news.

== Kazakh clothing ==
The origin and development of traditional Kazakh clothing are closely tied to the nomadic lifestyle of the Kazakh people. For centuries, Kazakhs lived in harmony with the natural environment, and their clothing was primarily designed to protect them from harsh weather conditions, including the severe cold of winter, the intense heat of summer, and the strong winds of spring and autumn. Most garments were made from materials derived from livestock, reflecting the distinctive features of a nomadic way of life. Wool and hides from sheep, camel wool, leather, and animal furs served as the primary materials for crafting traditional clothing.

Syrt kiim (outerwear)

The shapan is a traditional Kazakh garment recognized for its historical significance and cultural value. This outerwear typically features an inner layer of wool or cotton for insulation, covered by sturdy and decorative fabrics such as broadcloth or velvet, with a lined interior. The garment’s collar can be designed either as an upright style or folded, while its neckline, front panels, and sleeves are often embellished with intricate Kazakh motifs.

Er adam bas kiim (men’s hats)

The tymaq is a traditional headwear for men, divided into two types: summer and winter. Summer tymaqs are lightweight and are often trimmed with black or red lambskin and fine furs. Winter tymaqs, on the other hand, are made from thick felt and crafted using the pelts of furry animals such as foxes, corsac foxes, or lamb. Depending on the type of fur used, tymaqs are referred to by names like eltiri tymaq (lambskin tymaq), tulki 'tymaq' (fox tymaq), pushpaq tymaq (fine fur tymaq), and qarsaq tymaq (corsac fox tymaq).

The taqiya is a small headwear made from fabrics such as satin, broadcloth, or velvet, sewn using various methods like pleating or embroidery.

The börik is a traditional headwear with a crown surrounded by fur, worn by both men and women, with similar shapes for both genders.

Ayel adam bas kiim (women’s hats)

The saukele is a traditional headpiece worn by a bride during her wedding. It has a distinctive pointed, tall shape that tapers towards the round top. At the top of the saukele, an owl feather is attached, and a veil that partially covers the face is secured. Its outer layer is made of luxurious fabrics and adorned with precious stones such as gold, silver, pearls, and gemstones. The saukele is sewn with colorful, fine threads. The weight of the saukele can sometimes reach up to seven kilograms, symbolizing the bride's social status. The main components of the saukele include the crown, top, earflaps, and rear section. It is made from specially pressed white felt or fabric with wool inserted, and covered with expensive materials such as silk, damask, brocade, velvet, and mohair. The edges are often decorated with sable or marten fur.

The kimeshek is a traditional headpiece worn by married women. It has special cutouts for the face, and the part that covers the shoulder also covers the woman’s chest. There are several types of kimesheks, differing in shape, decoration, and the length of the shoulder covering.

The zhaulyk is a traditional headpiece worn by older women, wrapped around the head. The term "ak zhaulyk" is used to honor revered mothers and grandmothers, while the phrase "zhaulyk salu" refers to this tradition. The zhaulyk is often worn over the kimeshek.

Ayak kiim(shoes)

Mäsi is a traditional Kazakh footwear, typically made from leather or fabric. It is narrow, slip-on, and usually lacks a shaft, making it easy to wear. Mäsi is commonly worn in the summer due to its lightness and comfort, keeping the feet cool. Mäsi can be decorated with intricate patterns, especially those worn during special holidays and celebrations. It holds an important place in Kazakh culture and continues to retain its significance today.

Baipaq is a traditional warm footwear of the Kazakh people, usually made from leather or wool. The distinctive feature of baipaq is its length and narrowness, which makes it easy and comfortable to wear. Its shaft reaches up to the knee and is intended for cold weather, outdoor wear, or during winter. Baipaq is typically lined with felt or wool to keep it warm and soft. It is popular among herders and rural residents as it protects the feet from the cold. The exterior of baipaq is often decorated with various patterns, giving it an elegant and attractive appearance.

== Languages ==
The official language is Kazakh, a Turkic language closely related to Nogai and Karakalpak. Another widely spoken language is Russian. The recent language policy suggests trilingualism as an important factor for future development of the country.

The Kazakh language traces its origins to the 15th and 16th centuries, evolving from the language of the Central Asian Kipchaks. The development of a distinct literary form of Kazakh began in the latter half of the 19th century, influenced by prominent poets and educators such as Abai Kunanbayev and Ibray Altynsarin, alongside the rich traditions of Kazakh folklore. Before this period, the Central Asian Turkic language served as the literary standard, contributing to the early foundations of the Kazakh literary language. The standardization of literary Kazakh was largely completed during the 20th century.

Grammatically, the language is notable for its extensive use of participial and adverbial constructions. The vocabulary contains significant influences from Arabic and Persian, which account for approximately 15% of its lexicon, and borrowings from Mongolian and Russian.

== Literature ==
The nomadic lifestyle of the Kazakh people fostered a rich tradition of oral creativity, which became the primary means of creating, preserving, and transmitting literary works. Kazakh oral poetry has ancient roots, while the development of written literature in its modern form began to take shape in the mid-19th century. In the 16th century, legendary figures such as Asan Kaigy and improvisational poets (akyns) like Dospambet and Shalkiiz gained prominence for their works. By the 18th century, akyns such as Bukhar-zhyrau Kalkamanuly were recognized for their politically charged and poignant poetry. The akyns of the late 19th century, including Birzhan Kozhagulov, Asset Naimanbayev, Sarah Tastanbekova, and Zhambyl Zhabayuly, utilized aytysh—a traditional form of poetic improvisation—as a platform to voice public opinion and advocate for social justice. This oral tradition remains a cornerstone of Kazakh cultural and literary identity.

Written literature

Modern Kazakh written literature began to emerge in the latter half of the 19th century, influenced by increasing interactions with Russian and Western cultures. Pioneering educators and intellectuals such as Shoqan Walikhanov, Ybyrai Altynsarin, and Abay Qunanbayuli played a foundational role in shaping this literary evolution.

The early 20th century marked a flourishing period for Kazakh literature, characterized by the adoption of European literary forms and styles. This era saw the establishment of modern Kazakh literature, the consolidation of the literary language, and the introduction of new genres such as novels and novellas.

During the late 19th and early 20th centuries, a group of traditionalist writers, including Nurzhan Naushabayev and Mashhur-Zhusup Kopeev, promoted patriarchal values and actively worked to preserve Kazakh folklore. Meanwhile, nationalist intellectuals associated with the Kazakh newspaper—such as Ahmet Baitursynuly, Mirjaqip Dulatuli, and Magzhan Zhumabayev—championed modernist and reformist ideas. Following the 1917 Bolshevik Revolution (Russian Revolution), many of these figures became aligned with opposition to Bolshevik rule, reflecting the broader political and cultural tensions of the time.

Soviet-era literature

The foundations of Kazakh Soviet literature were established by prominent poets Saken Seifullin and Ilyas Dzhansugurov, as well as writers Mukhtar Auezov, Sabit Mukanov, and Beimbet Mailin. The Soviet period is particularly notable for the development of large-scale literary works, including epic novels and historical chronicles.

One of the most significant contributions to Kazakh literature is Mukhtar Auezov's tetralogy, The Way of Abai, the first epic novel in the Kazakh language following European literary traditions. This four-part novel explores the life of Abay Qunanbayuli, a renowned Kazakh poet and philosopher, and vividly portrays Kazakh society in the late 19th century. It provides a dramatic and nuanced depiction of the customs, struggles, and aspirations of both nomadic and settled communities in the Kazakh steppe. The novel captures the Kazakh people's spirit, resilience, and yearning for a better future.

Ilyas Yesenberlin's trilogy, Nomads, is another cornerstone of Kazakh literature. Awarded the State Prize of the Kazakh SSR, this historical novel spans the 15th to 19th centuries and chronicles the formation and struggles of the Kazakh Khanate.

The trilogy consists of three parts:

–The Enchanted Sword (15th–16th centuries), which details the establishment of the Kazakh Khanate amidst internal and external conflicts.

–Despair (17th–18th centuries), which narrates the Kazakh people's resistance against foreign invasions and their eventual submission to the Russian Empire. It highlights the heroic deeds of Abylai Khan and the victories over the Dzungarian invaders.

–Khan Kene (18th–19th centuries), which focuses on Ablai Khan and his grandson Kenesary Kasymov, the last Kazakh khan who led an anti-colonial uprising between 1837 and 1847.

Contemporary literature

The literature of independent Kazakhstan is in a formative stage, characterized by an exploration of global literary traditions and the pursuit of innovative forms of expression. Modern Kazakhstani authors who have gained significant readership include Olzhas Suleimenov, Herald Belger, Abdizhamil Nurpeisov, Azilkhan Nurshaikhov, Kadyr Myrzaliev, Tumanbai Moldagaliev, Nurlan Orazalin, Ivan Shchegolikhin, Maurice Semashko, Bakhytzhan Kanapyanov, Dulat Isabekov, and Alibek Askarov. These writers represent a diverse range of themes and styles, reflecting the dynamic cultural landscape of post-Soviet Kazakhstan and contributing to the development of the nation's literary identity.

== Art ==
Each year Kazakh artisans participate in the "Sheber" competition. The competition is part of the program "Development of crafts and the revival of folk arts and crafts in Kazakhstan", which began in 2006 to increase the competitiveness of Kazakh artisans’ products domestically and internationally. This program is conducted by the Union of Artisans of Kazakhstan, "Chevron", the Eurasia Foundation of Central Asia, Kazakh Ministry of Culture and Information and the UNESCO Cluster Office in Almaty.

== Movies ==
In September 2006, the government announced that it is funding distribution of a multimillion-dollar movie called Nomad, about the new-created by Kazakhstan government history of the nation. The movie started in 2003, and was plagued with multiple development problems, finally released in 2006.

Since that time such movies like Mongol, Tulpan, and Kelin have been released. All three films were submitted for the Academy Award for the Best Foreign Languages Film. The movie Tulpan won the Prix Un Certain Regard at the 2008 Cannes Film Festival. Kelin, a movie without dialogue or speech, made the shortlist of the 1982 Academy Awards.

== Music ==
=== Magic Songs of the Eternal Steppe ===
Magic Songs of the Eternal Steppe is a series of concerts at Carnegie Hall and The Kennedy Center in celebration of Kazakhstan Cultural Days in the United States. The concerts feature Kazakh folk music and Western classic masterpieces as well as American songs performed by the Kazakh National Kurmangazy Orchestra of Folk Instruments, Kazakh National Baikadamov Choir and a group of Kazakh soloists.

=== The Symphony Orchestra of the Kurmangazy Kazakh National Conservatory ===
Symphony Orchestra of the Kurmangazy Kazakh National Conservatory was founded in 1947. The first leader of the orchestra was Professor K. Babayev. The Orchestra has a vast repertoire spanning Haydn, Mozart, Beethoven, Schubert, Brahms, Liszt, Saint-Saens, Bizet, Ravel, Franck, Mahler, Orff, Tchaikovsky, Rachmaninoff, Mussorgsky, Shostakovich, and many others.

=== Orteke ===
Orteke is an indigenous Kazakh performing art which combines puppetry and music.

== Sports ==
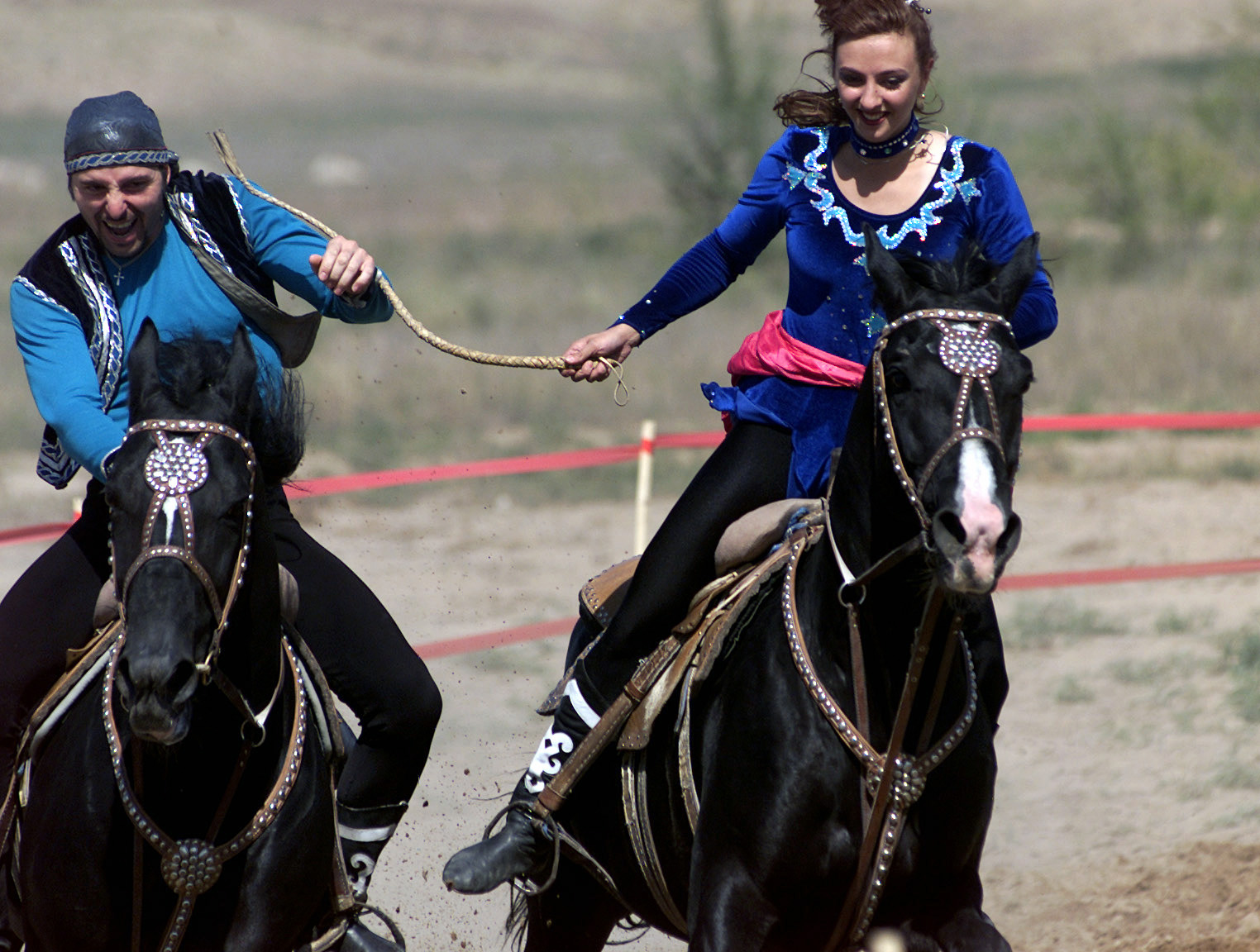
Horse riders in traditional dress demonstrate Kazakhstan's equestrian culture by playing a kissing game, Kyz Kuu ("Chase the Girl"), one of a number of traditional games played on horseback.

Kazakhstan has cultivated a strong interest in sports, physical education, and extracurricular activities. Kazakhstan has achieved some success in international competitions in weightlifting, ice hockey, and boxing. Kazakhstan won eight medals in the 2004 Summer Olympics, the largest tally for any nation in Central Asia.

Football is the most popular sport in Kazakhstan. The Football Federation of Kazakhstan (FFK) is the sport's national governing body. The FFK organises the men's, women's, and futsal national teams. The Kazakhstan Super League is the top-level competition for the sport in the country.

Road cycling is Kazakhstan's most successful sport. Many professional cyclists that compete on the European circuit come from Kazakhstan. Most notable is Alexander Vinokourov, whose achievements include two Paris–Nice victories (2002, 2003), third place in the 2003 Tour de France, and first place in the 2003 Amstel Gold Race. Vinokourov leads XDS Astana Team, which is supported by a coalition of Kazakh companies. This team is registered as a UCI ProTeam and competes in major races, including the Tour de France.

Rugby union is a popular sport in Kazakhstan, with over 10,000 fans consistently turning up to watch the Kazakhstan national rugby union team play. Recent big wins over Sri Lanka and the Arabian Gulf Rugby Team have given the Kazakhstan side the reason to believe that they could have been contenders to qualify for the 2011 Rugby World Cup. Kazakhstan has yet to qualify for the Rugby World Cup tournament.

== Ruhani Zhangyru ==
President Nursultan Nazarbayev outlined six specific projects designed to start the spiritual modernisation of Kazakhstan in his keynote article “Course towards the Future: Modernisation of Kazakhstan's Identity," which was released in April 2017. The projects include the following:

- a step-by-step transition of the Kazakh language to the Latin alphabet and the New Humanitarian Knowledge
- 100 New Textbooks in the Kazakh Language
- Tugan Zher
- Sacred Geography of Kazakhstan
- Modern Kazakh Culture in the Global World
- 100 New Faces of Kazakhstan.

The program also includes translation of the contemporary Kazakh literature and poetry into the UN's six languages. The official presentation of the Anthology took place in Almaty in April 2019.

The presentation of the Anthology translated into English was held at the British Library in London on September 25, 2019. The Cambridge University Press along with the British literary translation experts translated and published the Kazakh literature collections in English.

An important part of the program is the Seven Facets of the Great Steppe doctrine, which described by President Nazarbayev. The article described the seven facets of the Great Steppe: culture of horsemanship, ancient metallurgy of the great steppe, animal style, Golden Man, cradle of the Turkic world, the Great Silk Road and the land of apples and tulips.

== See also ==
- History of Kazakhstan
- Kazakh clothing
- List of libraries in Kazakhstan
