= Myra Waldo =

American food writer

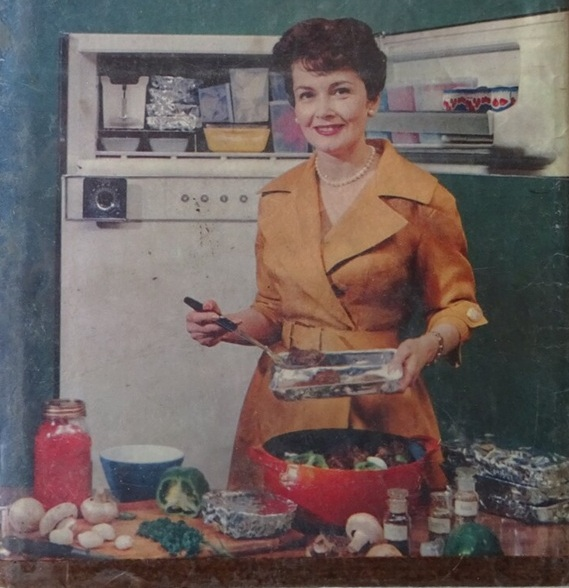
Waldo c. 1960

Myra Waldo Schwartz (1915 or 1916 – July 25, 2004) was an American food writer who wrote prolifically on international cuisines and locations for a domestic audience.

From the 1950s through the 1970s, Waldo was an influential advocate for American travelers eating local food, and home cooks making food from outside America. Over her career, she worked in a range of roles around food, including as a restaurant critic and food editor for radio and print. By the time of her death, Waldo had written more than 40 books on subjects including The Art of Spaghetti Cookery, 1,001 Ways to Please Your Husband, and The Complete Round the World Cookbook.

== Early life ==
Waldo was born in 1915 or 1916 in Manhattan, New York. As a child, she accompanied her father in his travels across Europe in his role as a cosmetics salesman and later attended Columbia University. In 1937, Waldo married Benny Schwartz, a corporate lawyer and author. When World War II began and Schwartz enlisted in the navy, the pair moved to Florida. There, Waldo gave her friends lessons in cookery, through which she gained an interest in food as a career.

== Career ==
=== 1950s ===
In 1954, Waldo published her first book, Serve at Once: The Soufflé Cookbook under her maiden name, continuing to do so for the rest of her career. The book advised on the creation of soufflés in the American-style, and a contemporary review in the New York Times described several elements of Waldo's advice as contentious, particularly her insistence on avoiding electric beaters and greasing the sides of the cooking receptacle unless the container is to be lined with sugar.

The same year, Waldo released another book—the Round-the-World Cookbook, published by Doubleday as a collaboration with Pan American World Airways. This was a compilation of recipes collected by Pan Am employees, with Waldo providing supporting commentary and argued that tourists should eat the food of the locales they visit and for domestic cooks to make the foods of other cultures. She would continue at this over the following two decades; historian Daniel E. Bender described Waldo in this period as "the United States’ leading popularizer of non-Western foods for tourists and home cooks" and the book was the first in a genre of around-the-world cookbooks, which reached a peak between the late 1950s and mid-1970s. The Round-the-World Cookbook sold well, and Waldo reached celebrity status. Although the recipes introduced new flavors to the American palate, the dishes did not closely resemble their inspirations; a chicken korma recipe would have been unrecognizable to an Indian, and chef Yotam Ottolenghi describes a "Malaysian coconut chicken curry" dish as "not one bit authentic".

By 1960, Waldo had published twelve cookbooks, the product of extensive travel with her husband. Waldo's cookbooks around this time included texts on weight loss and The Complete Book of Gourmet Cooking for the American Kitchen, covering dishes that had gained popularity after World War II such as quiche Lorraine, chicken Marengo, and paella Valenciana; Craig Claiborne in the New York Times praised the book as a "delightful gift" despite occasional oversimplification. A profile that year in the New York Times recounted a series of anecdotes that had come about from Waldo's travels: a white-tablecloth dinner of game pâté, homemade bread, and stuffed and braised francolin eaten in a clearing while on safari and an event Waldo hosted in Moscow, where she served Bloody Mary cocktails made with Russian vodka and American tomato juice to a group of 60 Russians. It also recounted other events Waldo had attended, including a coming-of-age ceremony in Burma and the birthday of the emperor of Japan. At this time, she hosted dinners each month for the Overseas Press Club and consulted for Pan Am. Profiles during this period often commented on Waldo's looks: in the second half of the 1950s, separate articles in the New York Times described her as a "petite, fine-featured world traveler", "as pretty as Billy be damned", and someone who "may well be the most comely of cookbook authors".

=== 1960s and onwards ===
Over the following decade, Waldo continued writing cookbooks including The Art of South American Cookery (1961) and The Art of Spaghetti Cookery (1964) and began to write travel guides—by 1969 she had released around twenty books. Her output was attributed by Claiborne to an approach towards food as a commodity and the interest of publishers in having her as a writer: "If I write an article in The Times on a woman who cooks shrimp, the next day [Waldo will] be called by every publisher in New York to write THE definitive shrimp cookbook". Starting in 1968, Waldo began an on-air role at WCBS radio as an editor of food and travel content, continuing in the position until 1972. A book titled Restaurant Guide to New York City and Vicinity came out of the role, which Waldo continued to publish revisions of into the 1980s.

Waldo stopped writing travel guides in 1981, by which point she had covered South America, Europe, Japan, and the South Pacific over several editions. Soon, she picked up a role as a travel columnist for the Los Angeles Times, finishing by the middle of the decade.

At other times in her career, Waldo worked as a food editor for the magazine This Week, a publication of the Baltimore Sun.

== Death and legacy ==
Waldo died on July 25, 2004, at the age of 88 of heart failure, seven years after Schwartz. By the time of her death, Waldo had written over forty books. These had included texts on cooking with wine, barbecue, Spanish cuisine, and a 1955 cookbook with actress Gertrude Berg titled The Molly Goldberg Jewish Cookbook, named after Berg's character in the radio and television comedy The Goldbergs. Outside of cookery and travel were advice books that relied on Waldo's celebrity, covering topics such as marriage (for instance 1,001 Ways to Please Your Husband) and dieting. Twenty years after her death, Waldo is less well known than her cookbook-writer peers of the mid-20th century, and only her book on soufflés remained in print.

== Bibliography ==
- Bender, Daniel E (2023). The Food Adventurers: How around-the-world travel changed the way we eat. London: Reaktion Books. ISBN 978-1-78914-757-5.
