= Dauylpaz =

Kazakh musical instrument

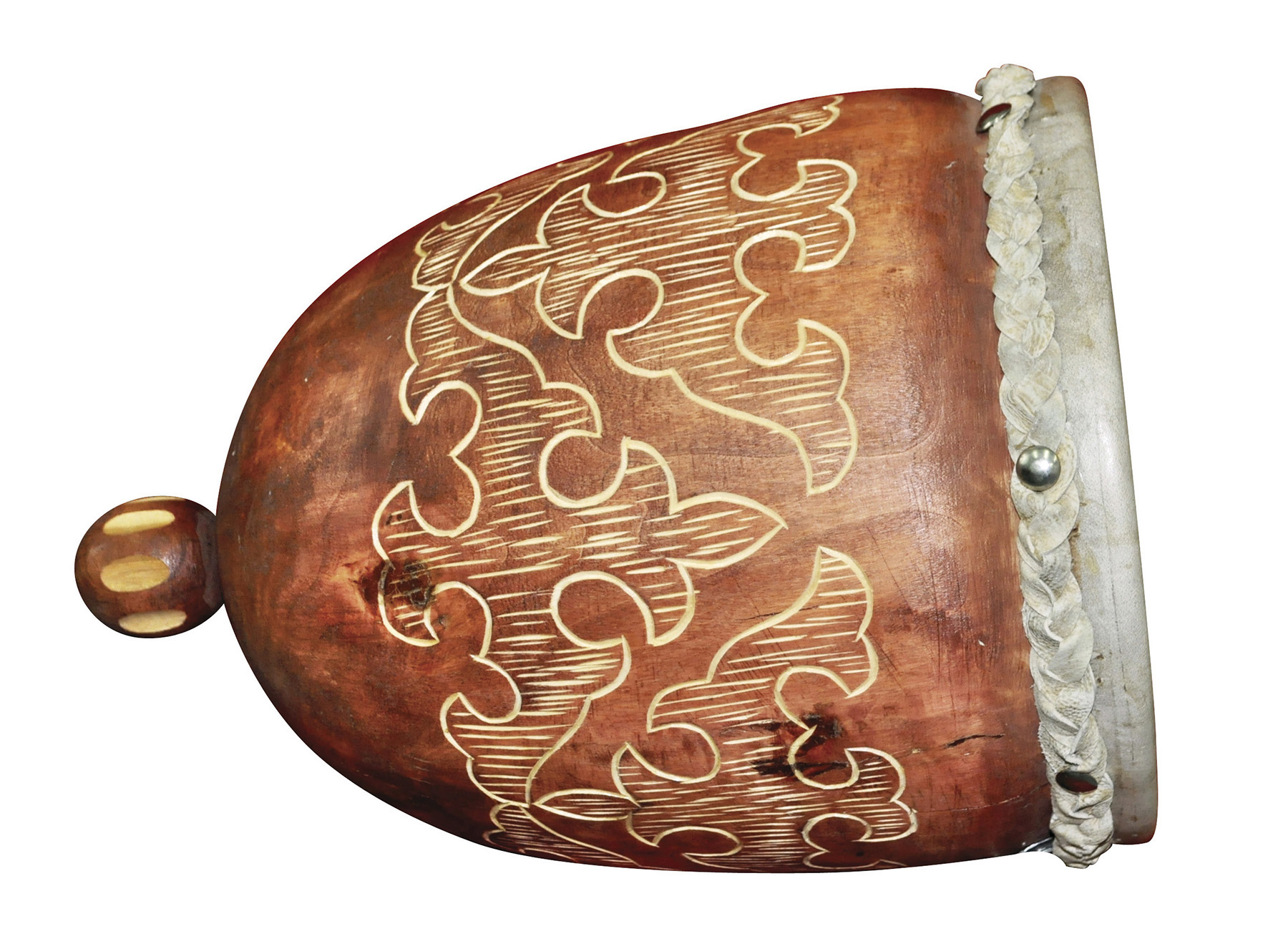
Dauylpaz (little)

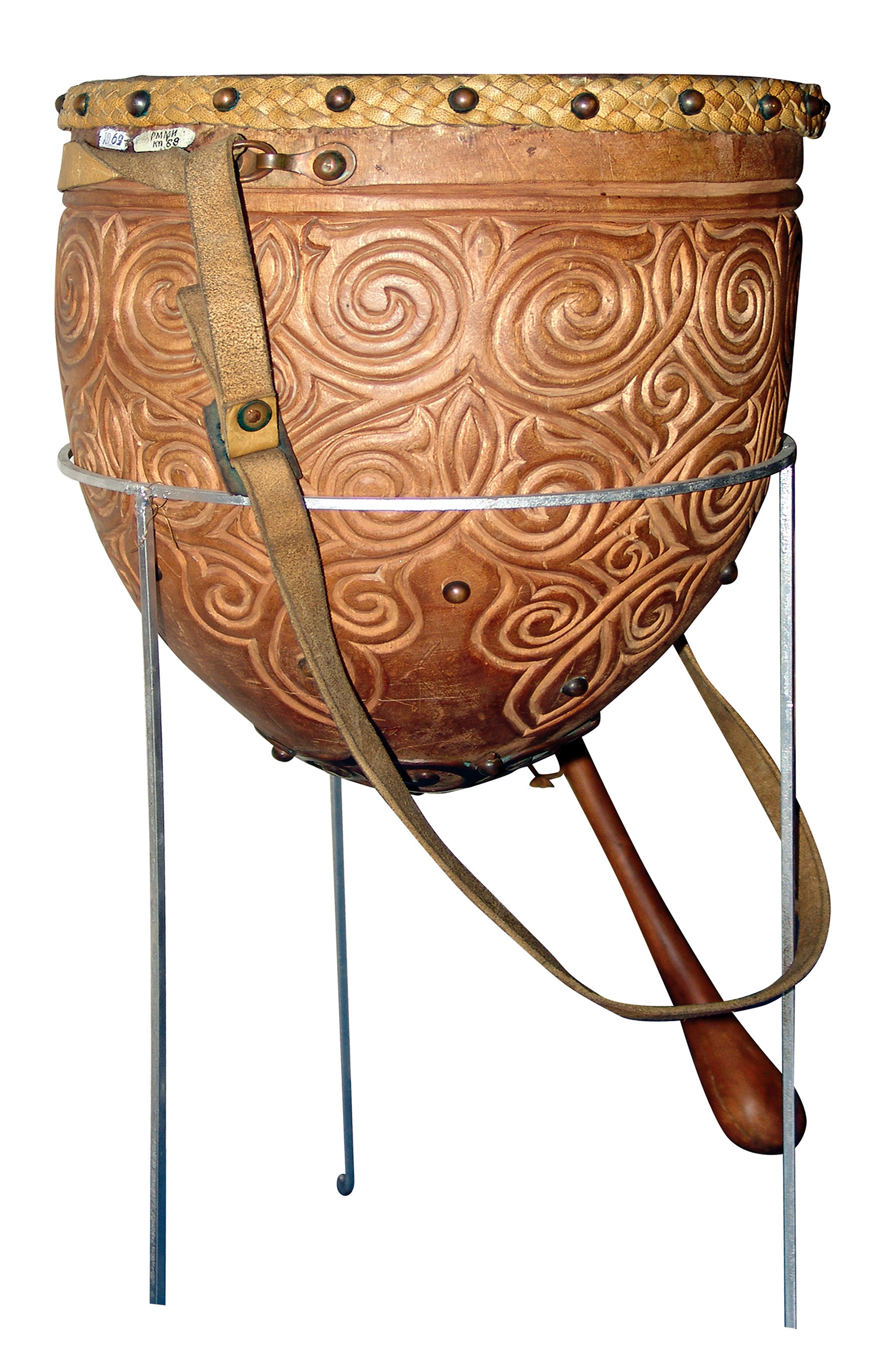
Dauylpaz (Big)

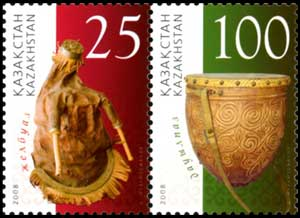
Stamp released by the government of Kazakhstan in 2008. The image on the right depicts a dauylpaz

A Dauylpaz (Kazakh: дауылпаз) is a percussion signal instrument used by the Kazakhs. The drum-like instrument was originally used to convey signals during battle, and later became commonplace in Kazakh culture. The instrument fell out of widespread use in the 20th century.

== Description ==
The dauylpaz is an ancient, cauldron-shaped musical instrument. One end of the drum is an open space with taunt leather stretched across the larger, bowl shaped base. The instrument is played with a stick or mallet, and is worn on a belt.

A nomadic people for much of their history, the Turkic Kazakh people occasionally fought among each other or against neighboring peoples. To communicate in battle, a multitude of signals were used, including drums. Drums also had an important role in Kazakh society, where they were used to signal an upcoming hunt, when the tribe was prepared to migrate, and in religious ceremonies. Overseen by shamans, such Kazakh religious ceremonies were held in order to celebrate births, deaths, marriages, and other events; dances and music made from a number of stringed or percussion instruments accompanied the rituals themselves. Certain instruments were used in certain rituals, with dauylpaz being used in rituals related to war or hunting. Notably, dauylpaz were used in a ritual dance (described as the "Kusbegi-dauylpaz", or "warrior-hunting bird") that entailed a warrior dancing with a hunting bird, as Kazakh hunters practiced falconry with eagles to hunt prey on the flat steppes of Central Asia.

The Kazakh-Dzungar Wars (fought between 1643 and 1756) devastated several of the Central Asian peoples, including the Kazakhs. In the aftermath of the conflict, the expansion of the Russian Empire and Qing dynasty resulted in the decline of the Kazakh way of life, including the people's musical tradition. By the 20th century, the dauylpaz was reported to no longer be widely used by the Kazakh. Some orchestras use the instrument.

In 2008, the government of Kazakhstan released a stamp depicting a dauylpaz.
