= Qovurma =

Azerbaijani dish

- Type: stew
- Course: main
- Created by: Turkic people
- Main ingredients: meat
- Ingredients generally used: green herbs, dried fruit, vegetables

Qovurma is a cooked dish that is part of the cuisine of Azerbaijan and the cuisine of Turkey. There are several varieties, all of which involve stewing meat with fruit, herbs, or vegetables, It is a variation of Kavurma.

Despite sometimes being translated as "kourma", the dish has no culinary relationship to the korma of the Indian subcontinent, although both names are derived from the same Turkic root.

== Etymology ==
The word "qovurma" is one of many, in several languages, thought to have descended from a prototypical Turkic root qawirma, first recorded in the 13th century, and which may have been spread across the region by the upper classes in the Timurid era.

== Preparation ==
In Turkic countries, "qovurma" refers to a number of related dishes, most of which are begun by frying meat in butter and which often include dried fruit. In addition to fruit, verjuice, sour grape juice, is often used as flavouring. Similar stews flavoured with fruit are found in the adjacent country of Iran, where they are referred to by the name khoresh.

Varieties include lamb qovurma, liver qovurma and sabzi qovurma. Sabzi qovurma, or lamb stew with herbs, is a blend of Persian and Turkic cooking: "sabzi" means "green" in Persian. Sabzi qovurma is served either accompanied by plov (pilaf), or as a dish on its own with yoghurt and crushed garlic.

Turşu qovurma combines lamb with preserved lemons and dried apricots and is flavoured with turmeric, while nur qovurma features lamb and pomegranate.
