= Korma =

Type of curry

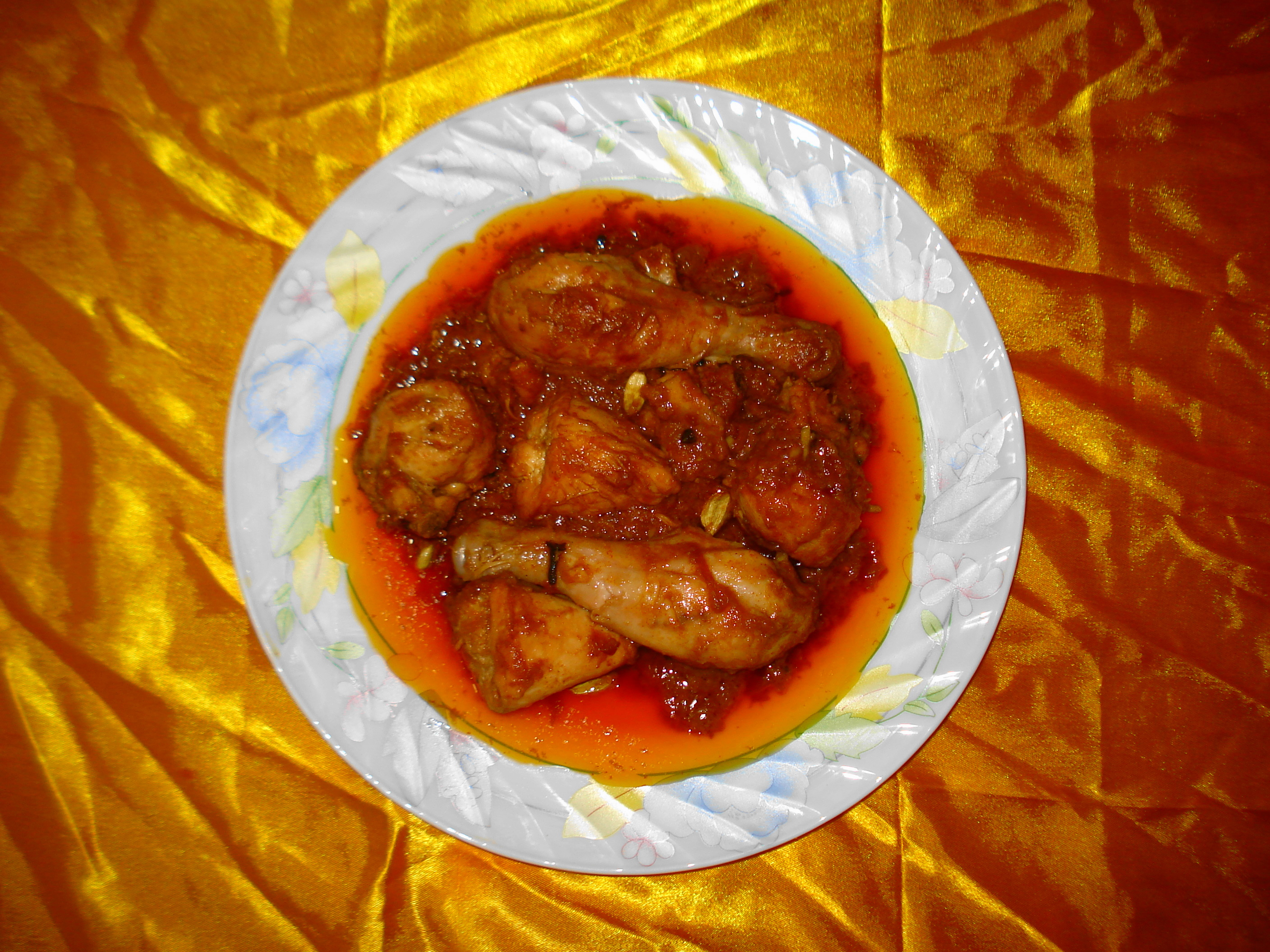
- Chicken korma
- Alternative names: Qorma
- Place of origin: Mughal Empire
- Region or state: India; Pakistan; Bangladesh; Iran; Afghanistan
- Associated cuisine: Mughal cuisine
- Serving temperature: Hot
- Main ingredients: meat, yogurt, coconut milk,ghee and spices

Korma, kurma, qorma or qurma (Urdu: قورمہ; Hindi: क़ोरमा; Bengali: কোরমা; Persian: قرمه; Kashmiri: قۄرمہٕ) is a curry dish originating in the Indian subcontinent influenced by Mughlai cuisine, versions of which later were modified to Anglo-Indian and then to British tastes. It consists of meat or vegetables braised with yogurt, water or stock, and spices to produce a thick sauce or gravy. The flavours of kormas are less intense than those of other Indian meat-containing dishes, and the fragrances more aromatic.

== Etymology ==
The English name is an anglicisation of the Hindi-Urdu qormā (क़ोरमा, قورمہ), meaning 'braising', the cooking technique used in the dish. All these words, and the names of dishes such as the Persian: قورمه ghormeh, the Turkish kavurma and the Azerbaijani qovurma or kavarma, are ultimately derived from the Turkic qawirma, "[a] fried thing". However, korma and modern Turkish kavurma are quite different dishes.

The etymology of korma. The English word is from Hindi-Urdu, derived ultimately from Turkic. The dishes named vary widely.

== History ==
Korma stems from Mughlai cuisine of the Indian subcontinent. Kormas were prepared in the Mughal court kitchens; according to the historian of food Neha Vermani, the dish is first mentioned in cookery books from the reign of Shah Alam (r. 1643–1712). During the 18th century, cooks in the Mughal court enriched the Persian-style stew with almonds, garlic, spices, and yoghurt. In Hyderabad in 1832, a "korma" variety of pilau included thinly sliced meat with rice.

Indian cooks in the 19th century prepared curries for their British masters simplified and adjusted to Anglo-Indian taste. A quarama from Lucknow contained (among other ingredients) ghee, yoghurt, cream, crushed almonds, cloves, cardamom, and saffron; whereas an 1869 Anglo-Indian quorema or korma, "different in substance as well as name", had no cream, almonds, or saffron, but added the then-standard British curry spices, namely coriander, ginger, and black peppercorns.

== Preparation ==
The korma style is similar to other braising techniques in that the meat or vegetable is first cooked briskly, or seared, using high heat, traditionally with ghee, and then subjected to long, slow cooking using moist heat and a minimum of added liquid. The pot may be sealed with dough during the last stages of cooking, using a technique called dum or dampokhtak. The spices are prepared using the bagar tempering technique, briefly fried in hot oil. In the later stage of cooking, additional spices are mixed with heated ghee and then combined with the sauce formed by the braising. The pan is then covered and shaken to release steam and mix the contents. As cooking ends, butter or cream is sometimes added. In modern Bangladeshi cuisine, some cooks use a thick evaporated milk in place of yoghurt.

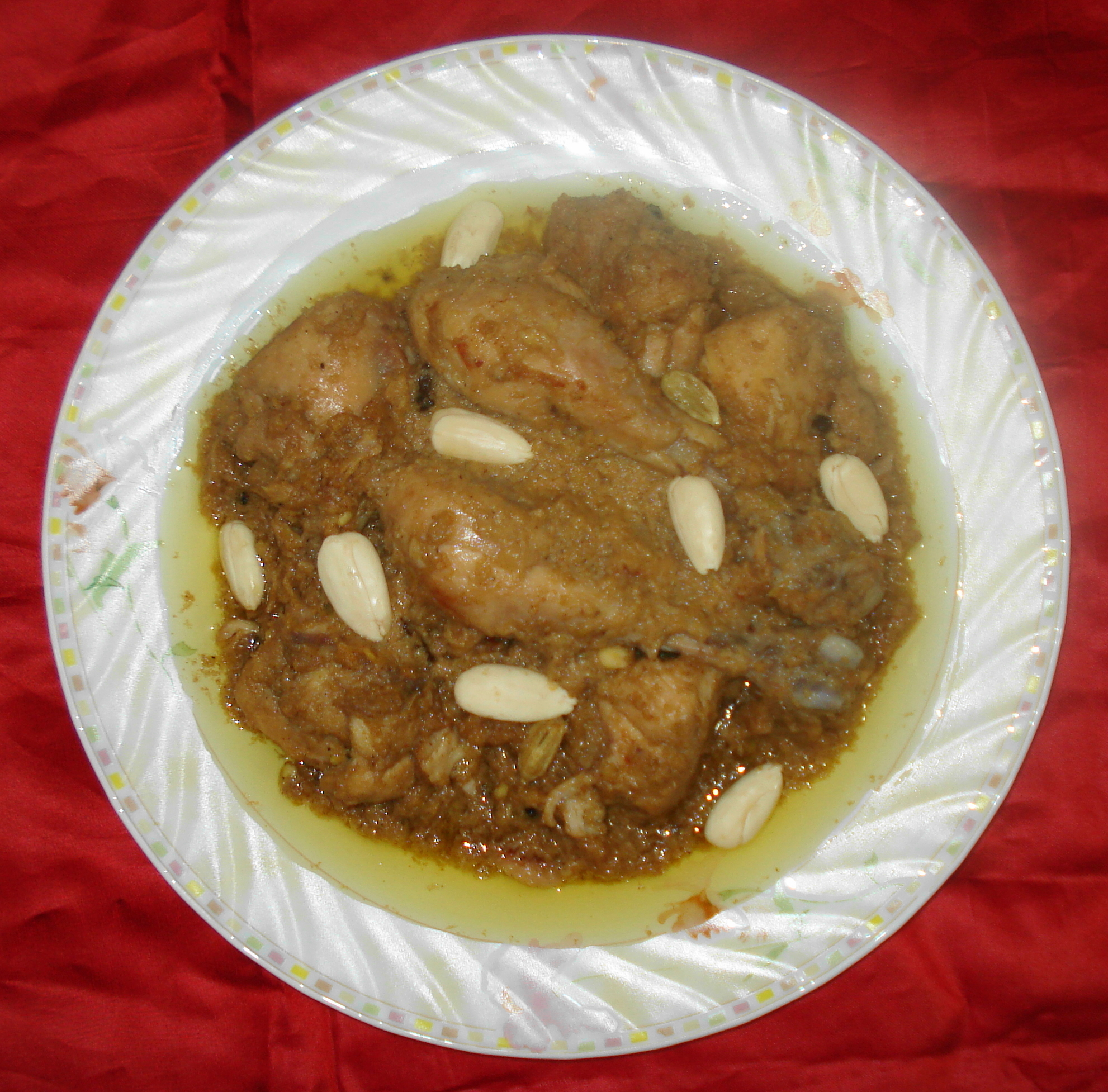
A chicken korma

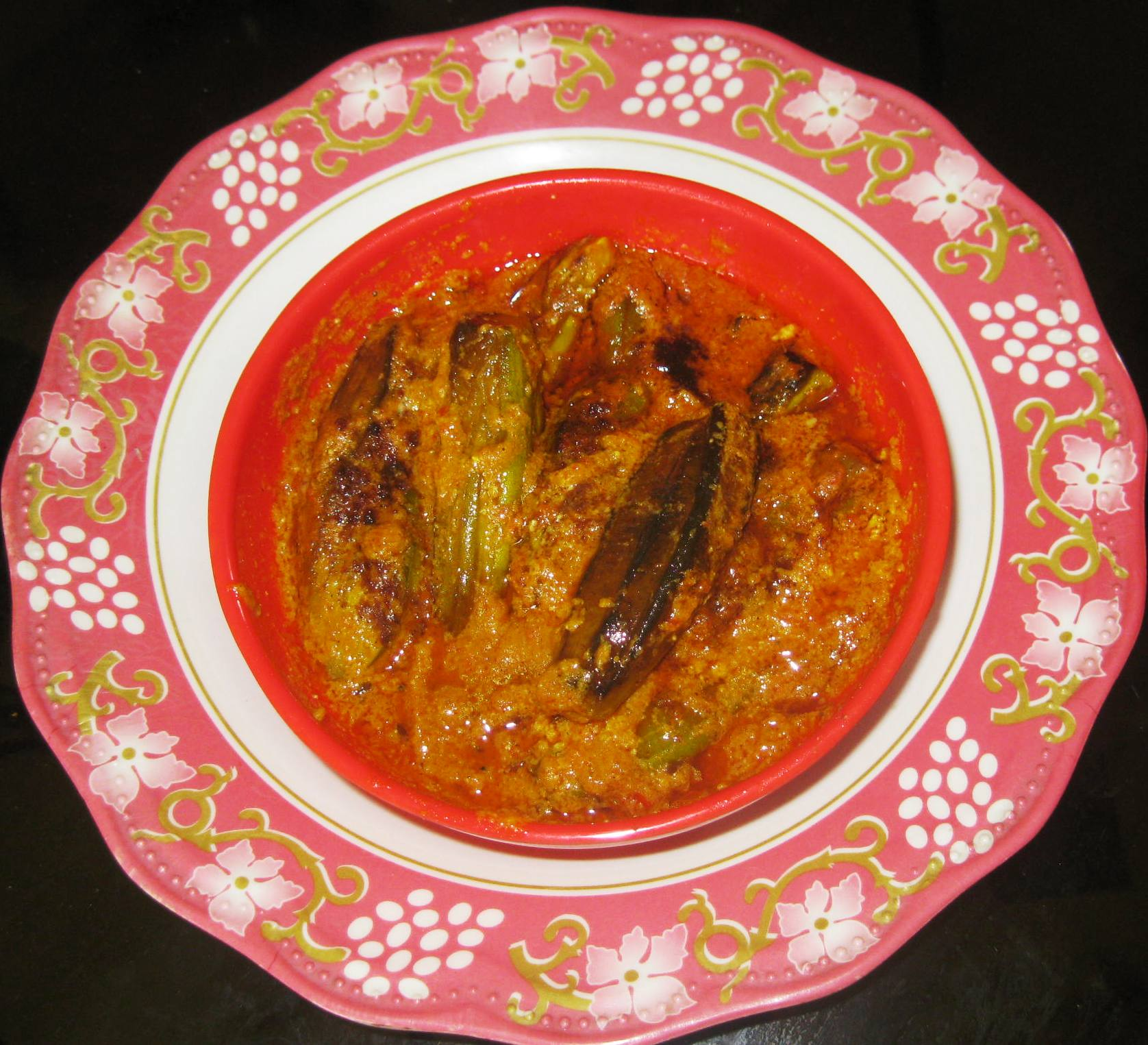
Potol (pointed gourd) korma

== Serving ==
Korma is eaten in various contexts in the modern Indian subcontinent. In banquets for Muslim weddings, a mutton korma is often eaten, and in the traditional wazwan, a banquet produced by Hindu and Muslim cooks for a range of celebrations, lamb and chicken kormas are common elements. Korma is also a common dish in tora, dishes sent to another's home in a practice originating in restrictions on women's presentation to members outside the home. Korma is among the most popular dishes in Pakistan, where it is commonly eaten at lunch, and at feasts that end days of fasts during Ramadan.

A common food eaten with the dish is sheermal, a flatbread flavoured with saffron. In Awadh, a historical region of Northern India now corresponding with Uttar Pradesh, silver leaf (vark) is a common garnish, and Pushpesh Pant writes that "no korma or pulao can be served without it". In areas of New Delhi, jaggery is often served with korma in winter months, based on the belief that it can help "the ghee go down".

== Variations ==
=== Navratan korma ===
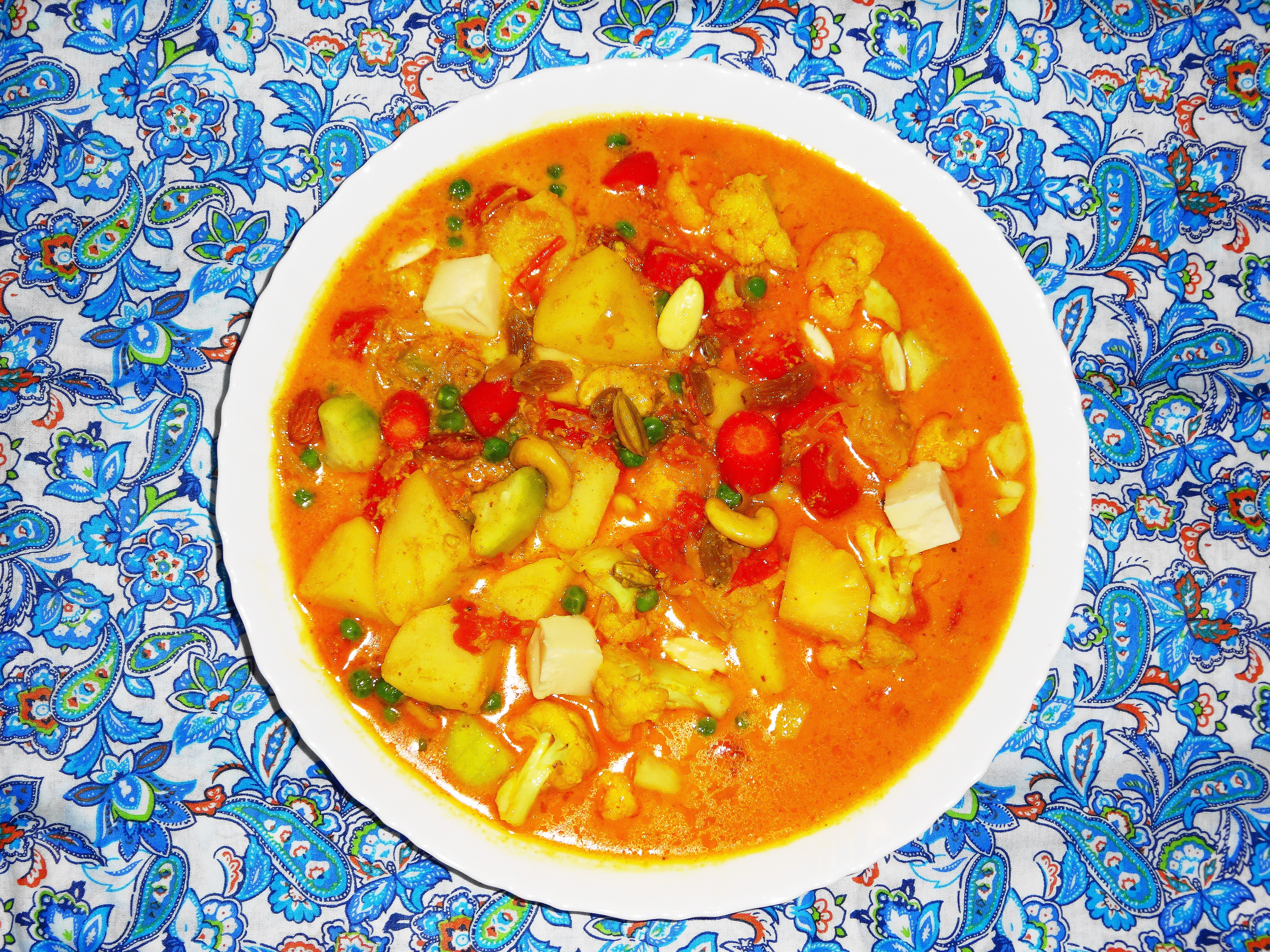
Navratan korma

Navratan korma is a vegetarian korma made with vegetables and either paneer (an Indian cheese) or nuts – or sometimes both. Navratan means "nine gems", and it is common for the recipe to include nine different vegetables.

=== In Indonesia ===
In Indonesia, korma or 'gulai kurma' is traditionally cooked with coconut milk instead of yoghurt, and it can use the sour flavouring tamarind to replace the acidity of yoghurt. The dish fuses Indian cooking with both Arabic and Minang cuisine. The word kurma means "date" in Malay/Indonesian, but the dish does not contain dates.

=== In the United Kingdom ===
In the United Kingdom, a typical korma as served in curry houses is a mildly spiced dish with a thick sauce. It often features almonds, cashews or other nuts, and coconut. In the early 21st century, chicken korma has repeatedly been cited as amongst the most popular curries in the UK. The celebrity cook Jamie Oliver uses korma curry paste and coconut milk in his recipes for quickly-prepared fish curry and spiced prawn soup.

=== In the United States ===
A dish called chicken korma was popularly introduced to the United States with the 1954 publication of Myra Waldo's Round-the-World Cookbook. Waldo modified a dish of marinated chicken and sauteed chicken that was then popular in America by adding black pepper, coriander, cumin, turmeric, and chilli powder blend, or just curry powder. Though it was unlike the korma eaten in India, it was perceived as exotic, as many of these spices had only just been introduced to the American diet.
