= Kavurma =

Fried meat dish of Turkic origin

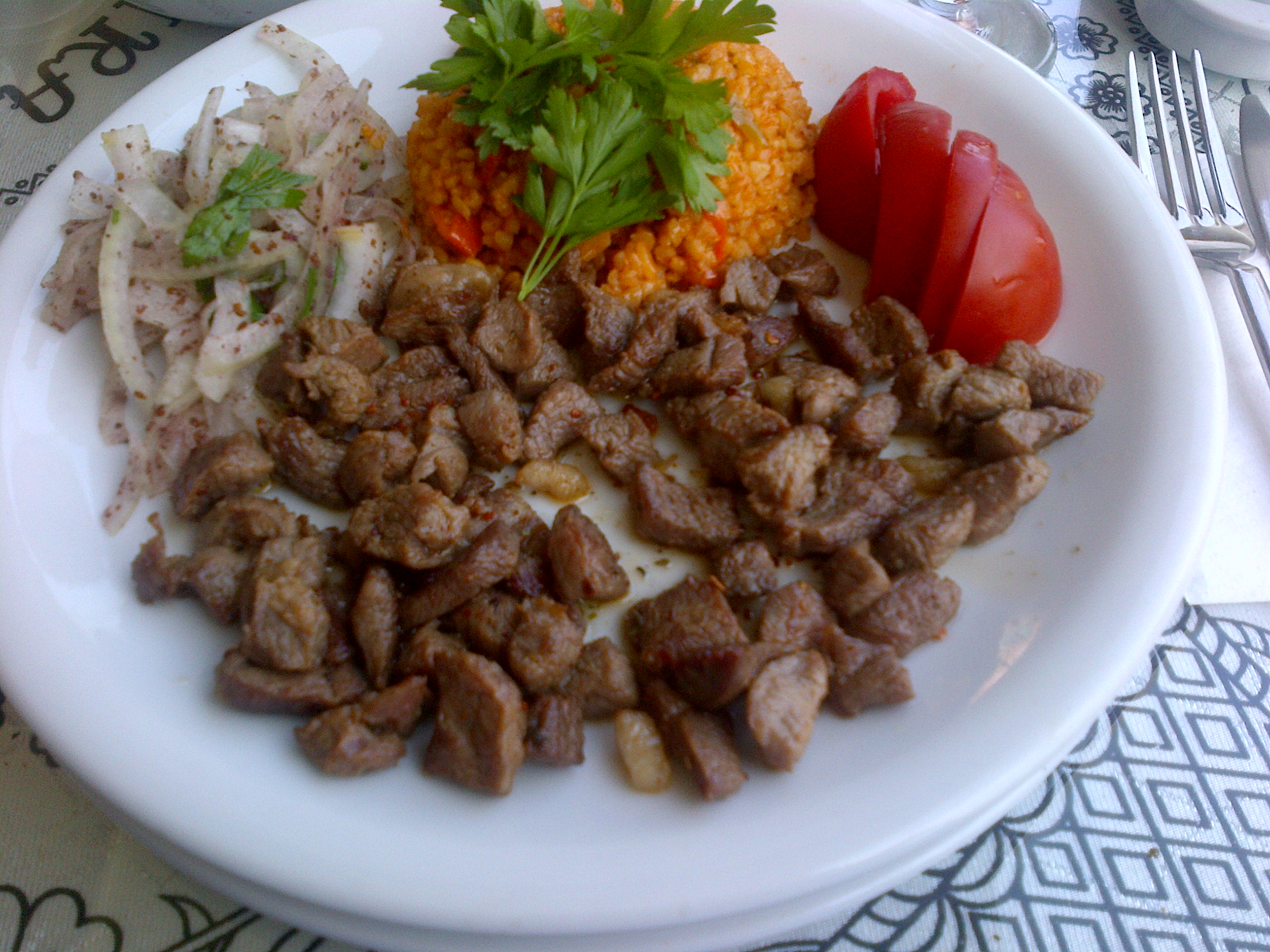
- Lamb kavurma
- Alternative names: Sac kavurma
- Type: Frying, Sauté
- Course: Main course, appetiser, side dish
- Place of origin: Turkey, Central Asia
- Main ingredients: Lamb, mutton or beef meat, animal (mostly tail fat) or vegetable oil, onions, chili pepper

Kavurma is a broad type of fried or sautéed meat dish found in Turkish cuisine. The name also refers to canned or preserved versions of a similar dish, prepared by dry frying the meat to render down the fat. It is present in cultures and cuisines of Turkey and neighbouring countries, including the Balkans, most notably in Bulgaria. Similar dishes are known in Central Asia as kuurdak, and in Hungary as tokány.

== Etymology ==
Its name comes from the Turkic word for the technique of frying, qawirma ("[a] fried thing") which subsequently was adopted into other languages such as Persian, Arabic, and Urdu-Hindi. Through these, the word - kavurma in the modern Turkish language - was the root of the names for other widely different dishes, such as the braised korma of the Indian subcontinent, the stewed qovurma of Azerbaijan and the stewed ghormeh of Iranian cuisine. Despite the use of the same root word, it is quite possible that the dishes themselves are not related. In Central Asia the dish is known as Kuurdak.

== Ingredients and technique ==
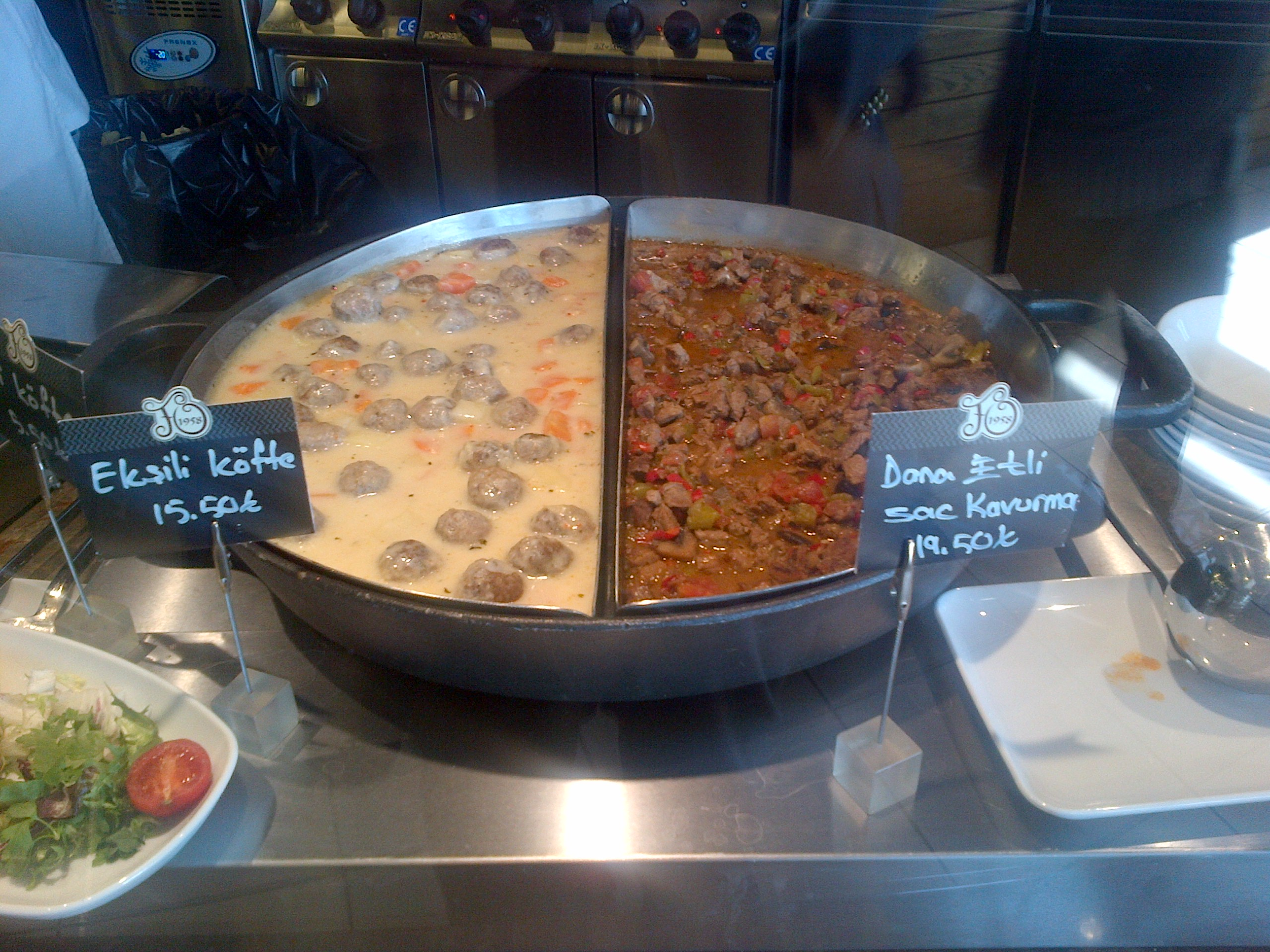
Saç kavurma, right, for sale with kofte

In Turkey, kavurma or saç kavurma refers to a dish made by sautéing or frying onions and meat such as lamb, beef, hare or other game briskly over a high heat. Peppers such as urfa biber are nearly always used, and the dish is cooked and often served in a shallow two-handled pan or saç which has its origins in the cooking utensils used by nomads. Çoban Kavurma, "shepherd's kavurma", similarly comprises meat fried with onion, tomato and capsicum, while sahanda kavurma is served in a small metal pan called a sahan.

== Preserved kavurma ==
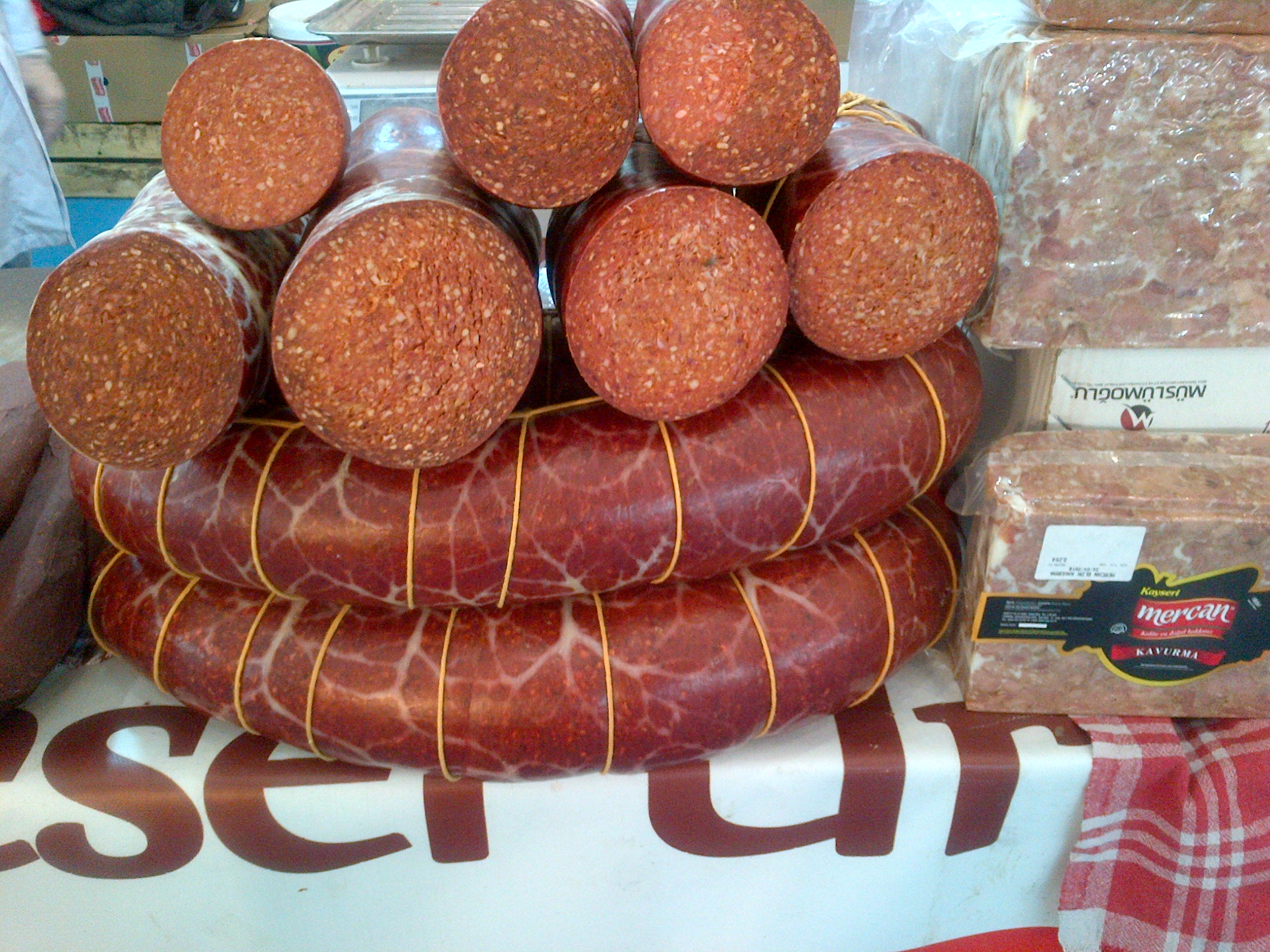
Sucuk (left) and kavurma (right)

A related dish, also known as kavurma, involves frying the finely minced meat slowly to render down the fat in a technique analogous to confit. Like confit, the meat can then be stored in jars or other containers sealed with a layer of fat: commercially produced versions are available from Turkish grocers. This type of "winter" kavurma was in the past an important part of the diet of the Turkish military, and was particularly used in times when fresh meat was scarce. It was often prepared from the meat of sheep slaughtered in the autumn, for storage during the winter, when small amounts would be used to flavour vegetable and cereal dishes. In Lebanon and Syria, the same preserving method is known as qawarma, and as qāwurma in Iraq, though in the latter the word is also used for the simple sautéd meat dish also found in Turkey. The same confit-like technique is also used in Turkmenistan to preserve lamb or camel meat.

== Meatless kavurma ==
In parts of northern and western Turkey kavurma refers to a vegetable dish. Like other versions, it begins by frying onions, but then adds chopped vegetables, often including pickled vegetables, along with water and cooking everything together. It is possible that this meatless form of kavurma has its origins in older fast day dishes of the region. This can also be made with Green beans.
