= Kazakh clothing =

Clothing worn by the Kazakh people

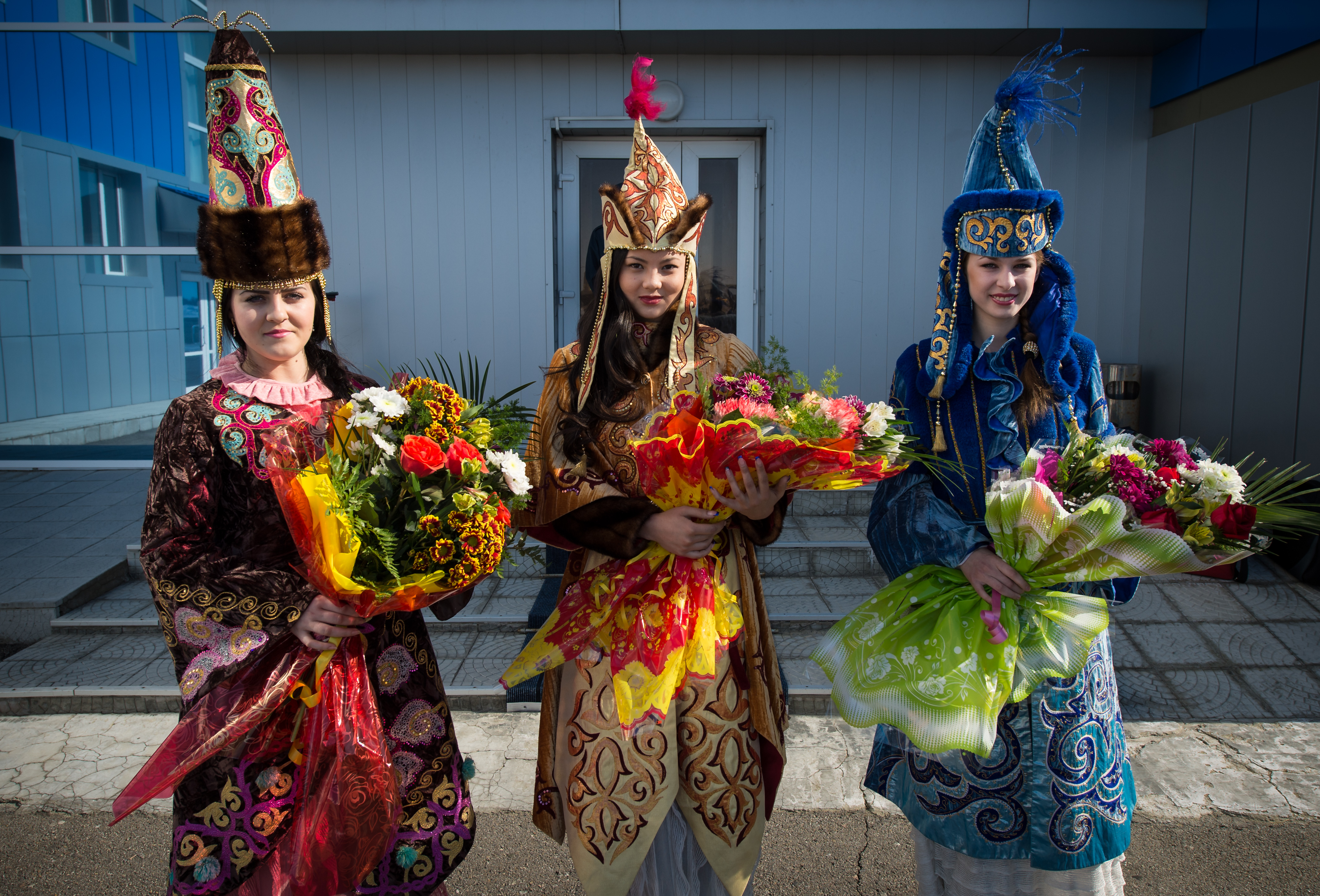
Kazakhstani women wearing a folk costume for ceremonial purposes.

Kazakh clothing, worn by the Kazakh people, is often made of materials suited to the region's extreme climate and the people's nomadic lifestyle. It is commonly decorated with elaborate ornaments made from bird beaks, animal horns, hooves and feet. Although contemporary Kazakhs usually wear Western dress, the Turkic people wear more traditional clothing for holidays and special occasions.

== Materials and production methods ==
Traditional materials used in Kazakh clothing include fabric, skin, felt, and fur. Embroidery, fur, jewelry, and ornamentation may also be used for decoration. Imported materials such as silk, brocade, and velvet can also be used for clothing, but are more expensive than traditional materials.

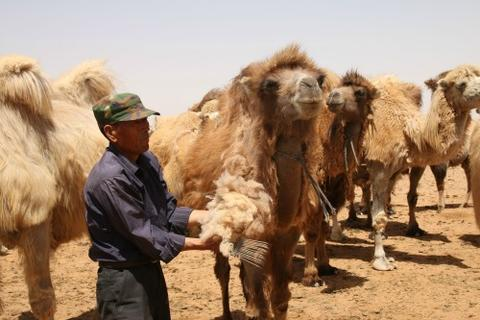
A Bactrian camel has its hair sheared for clothing.

Traditional materials, such as horsehair, fox fur, sheep's wool and rabbit hides, are used in the production of clothing. Preparation of the materials includes skinning, drying, and greasing the hides with a mixture of sour milk and flour. After four days, the skins are washed and soaked in a concentrated brine. After more drying, the underside of the hide is scraped with a skinning knife before being heated; this gives the skin its whitish color. The fur is then ready for dyeing in a variety of colors. Yellow dye is made from the crushed root of the Taranovy plant. Red dye is made from the root of Uiran Boyau, and orange dye is often made from dried pomegranate crusts.

Kazakhs often use white wool, and consider wool from the neck of a sheep valuable. The hair of the Bactrian camel is also used for more luxurious clothing. An undercoat, collected after the camel has molted, it is considered particularly valuable.

Imported cotton, silk, and woolen fabrics were used by Kazakh nomads. The feudal nobility used imported fabrics to make their clothing; less-affluent Kazakhs wore more easily accessible materials, such as furs, leather, and homemade wool. Fabrics were home-spun on a primitive, horizontal loom.

== Women's clothing ==
Women wear a shirt-like garment known as a köylek. Different fabrics are used, with more-expensive fabrics for festive wear and common fabrics for everyday use. The köylek is made by folding a piece of fabric in half and sewing the sides from the armpits to the bottom hem.

A köylek usually worn by unmarried Kazakh girls is typically made from a light, soft fabric which accentuates the waist. Kunikey means "sun-like" in Kazakh, and the word is used to describe this type of clothing. Kazakh girls wear trousers made of sheepskin, homespun cloth, and heavy cotton fabrics. They may be short (shalbar) or long (dalbar).

A kupe is a coat worn by women and men which is typically made of fox fur or, occasionally, goatskin. It is usually lined with camel or sheep wool and hemmed with otter fur on the sleeves for warmth during early spring and fall. A woman's kupe is distinguishable from a man's by its embroidered collar.

A staple article of Kazakh clothing is the chapan or shapan, a long, loose robe. Unlike other clothing, it is not gender-specific and is worn by men and women. Chapans are made from various fabrics and are available in a range of colors (most often monochrome or dark). They are lined with a layer of wool or cotton. Festive velvet chapans are decorated with appliqué, brushing, and gold embroidery. This type of robe was worn by wealthy Kazakhs.

A syrmaly is a chapan which is quilted and strengthened with denser fabric. A qaptal is a lined chapan, and a shabu is a chapan trimmed with fur.

=== Headgear ===
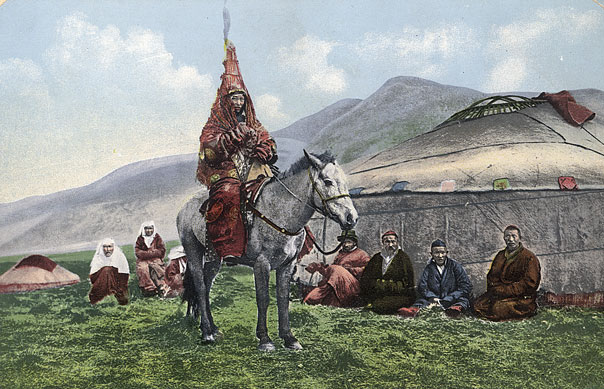
A Kazakh woman riding a horse, wearing the saukele.

Headgear indicate a woman's relationship status. Back in Nomad times, unmarried girls wear a skullcap scarf and a warm, fur-edged cap. Wealthier girls' hats are made of bright velvet fabric and embroidered with golden thread.

The bridal headgear of a bride is known as the saukele. These headdresses, often over a foot tall, are embedded with valuable ornaments such as pearls, coral, and pressed silver. Long suspension brackets, jaqtau, are fastened to the sides of the saukele and frame the bride's face. They sometimes reach the bride's waist. Less prosperous women make the saukele from cloth or satin and decorate it with glass beads; the zhaktau are added later.

After the birth of her first child, a woman wears a hat made of white fabric (often for the rest of her life). The details of the hat vary by region to region. It has two parts; the bottom (kimeshka) is placed on the head and the top is twisted to form a turban.

It has special cutouts for the face, and the part that covers the shoulder also covers the woman’s chest. There are several types of kimesheks, differing in shape, decoration, and the length of the shoulder covering. The design of the kimeshek also changes as a woman ages. The kimeshek was considered the primary headpiece for Kazakh women until the 1930s. The white color is chosen because it symbolizes the purity and sanctity of the female headpiece. The kimeshek, as an important part of Kazakh culture, defines a woman’s role in society and her marital status.

The zhaulyk is a traditional headpiece worn by older women, wrapped around the head. The term "ak zhaulyk" is used to honor revered mothers and grandmothers, while the phrase "zhaulyk salu" refers to this tradition. The zhaulyk is often worn over the kimeshek.

== Men's clothing ==
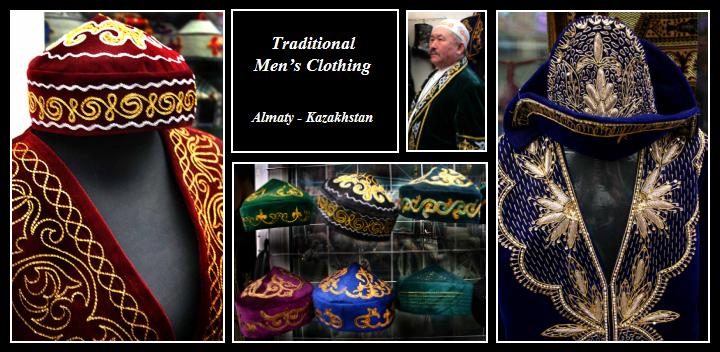
Traditional Kazakh men's clothing

Men wear two types of skin shirts (without an undershirt), inner and outer trousers and loose-fitting robes made from various materials and belted with leather or cloth. During the 18th century, the top trousers (shalbar) were sewn from homespun camel hair fabric and skin. They had embroidered silk patterns in vegetable shapes, the ends often sheathed by an ornate band and lace and edged with fur.

Jackets were sewn from monochrome dark (occasionally multicolored) fabrics. They had a cloth lining, often insulated with a thin layer of wool. Popular among young Kazakh men, the jargaq shapa is decorated with traditional patterns and worn on important occasions.

The coat (ton) is often made of sheepskin, but may be made from the skin of raccoons (janat ishik) or silver foxes (qara tulki). Nobles often wear kok ton, fur coats made from blue cloth covered (and trimmed) with beaver skin. Tons are often made by sewing together tanned sheepskins with wool on the inside; more prosperous Kazakhs wear tons made from the wool of four- to five-month-old lambs.

=== Headgear ===
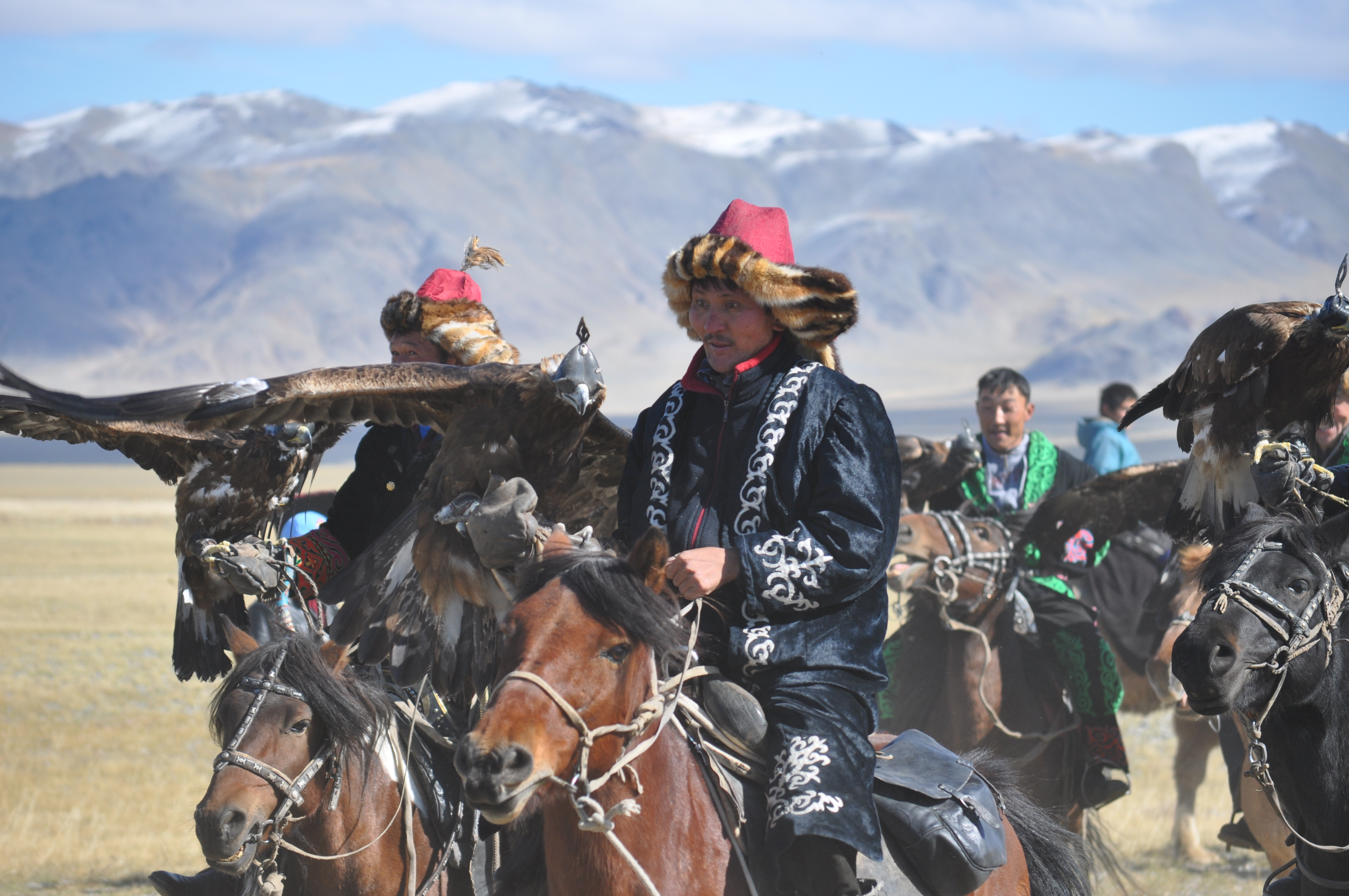
Kazakh hunters with eagles

An aiyr qalpaq is a pointed, upturned cap, usually worn by the upper class. The fabric cap is decorated with unique, ornamental patterns to indicate wealth, power and social status. A borik is a warm, round cap trimmed with otter, marten or raccoon fur, and a tymaq is a fur hat which covers the ears.

A kulapara is a hood worn by hunters, shepherds, and herdsmen which attaches to the coat collar. For camouflage, hunters wear differently colored kulapara in different seasons: white in winter, green in summer, and yellow in autumn. A taqiya is a light, round hat decorated with patterns which include zoomorphic embroidery, flowers, and animal horns.

A taqiya is a small headwear made from fabrics such as satin, broadcloth, or velvet, sewn using various methods like pleating or embroidery. There are also types with thick, soft linings, sometimes filled with thin wool or cotton. The taqiya for men comes in both embroidered and plain versions. It is sewn with either a four-panel top or a round shape. Men traditionally wear the taqiya as an essential headpiece under a larger hat.

A börik is a traditional headwear with a crown surrounded by fur, worn by both men and women, with similar shapes for both genders. In winter, men wear fur headpieces such as sable börik, sable hat, fox hat, and ear-flap börik, while in summer, they wear leather börik, puschpak börik, and light hats. Böriks and hats are made from the skins of lambs, sheep, kids, or other animals, and are lined with wool for warmth. Winter hats are often decorated with valuable fabrics such as velvet, plush, or satin for added elegance.

== Contemporary references ==
In 2021, 14-year-old Kazakh Snezhanna Lee, an Aktobe native, won the gold cup and $1 million South Korean won ($851 USD) at the 7th annual International Super Queen Fashion contest in Seoul, South Korea. According to The Astana Times, the judges were fond of her traditional Kazakh outfits, among other skills, which led to her winning the prize.
