= Ak-kalpak =

White felt hat worn by Kyrgyz men

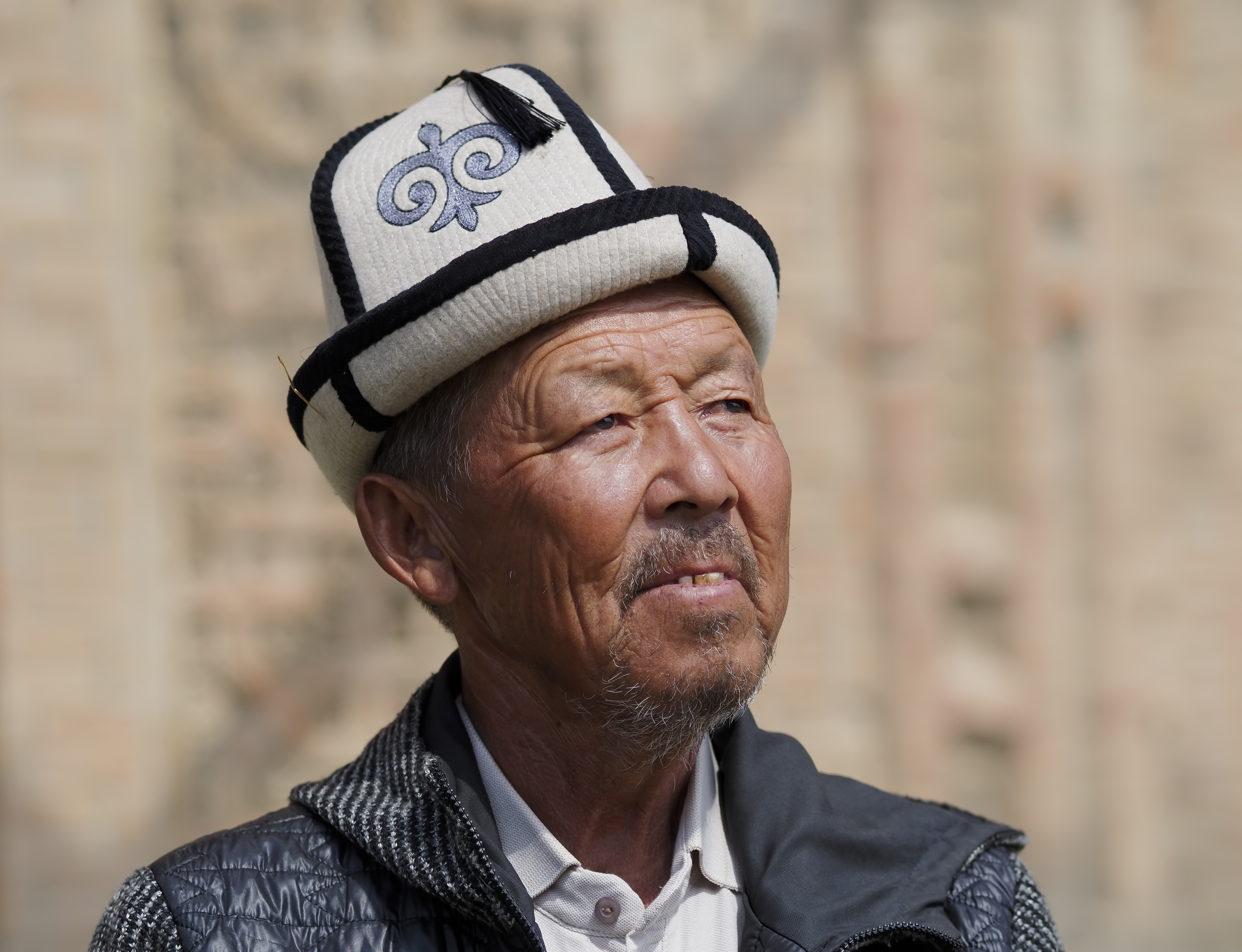
- A Kyrgyz man wearing an ak-kalpak
- Type: Hat
- Material: Wool felt
- Place of origin: Kyrgyzstan

Ak-kalpak craftsmanship, traditional knowledge and skills in making and wearing Kyrgyz men's headwear
- UNESCO Intangible Cultural Heritage
- Country: Kyrgyzstan
- Reference: 01496
- Region: Asia and the Pacific

Inscription history
- Inscription: 2019 (14th session)
- List: Representative

Ak-kalpak (Kyrgyz: Ак калпак) is a white felt hat that is traditionally worn by Kyrgyz men.

== Description ==
Ak-kalpak takes its name from the Kyrgyz words "ak" (white) and "kalpak", designating any form of hat. (This was passed into Russian as the kolpak in the fifteenth century). The ak-kalpak is an elongated cap formed of four pieces of white wool felt sewn together. It is worn rolled up, so as to form a small rim. Ak-kalpak are usually adorned with black embroidery and a matching lapel; the plain white version is reserved for certain ceremonies. There are more than 80 variants of it.

== Cultural and political aspects ==
Reputed to evoke the snow-capped peaks of Kyrgyzstan, it is decorated with embroidery with abstract patterns that also have symbolic meanings. Its four sides represent the four elements (water, earth, air, fire). The edges would bring back to life, the tassels which surmount it in memory of the ancestors and the embroidered motifs would evoke a family tree.

The ak-kalpak distinguishes the Kyrgyz from other local ethnic groups, but is presented as promoting inclusion "when representatives of other ethnic groups wear it to express their union." It now symbolizes the unity of the homeland. Since 2011, the headgear has been considered a de facto national symbol. Nationally, workshops perpetuate manufacturing traditions and exhibitions have been organized since 2013.

Unlike other traditional Kyrgyz clothing which have fallen out of fashion, the ak-kalpak is still regularly worn by men of all ages, in both the capital Bishkek and in the mountains. Since 2017, Kyrgyzstan has celebrated March 5 as "national Ak-kalpak day".

In December 2017 in Bishkek, a dog show in which a dog wore an ak-kalpak in a parade caused a national scandal. Several elected officials, including the ruling Social Democratic Party, castigated what they consider an insult to the motherland: in a country subject to ethnic tensions since the fall of communism in 1991, sensitivity is particularly important on questions of national identity and traditions.

Proposals drafted in response during early 2018 aimed to make the wearing of the ak-kalpak compulsory for the President of the Republic, ministers and certain other dignitaries during official ceremonies and international meetings, and introduces a fine for "disrespecting ak-kalpak", prohibiting its importation, or formally conferring it the status of "cultural symbol". President Sooronbay Jeenbekov repeatedly wore the traditional hat during his election campaign, but did not do so after his election in October 2017.

"Ak-kalpak craftsmanship, traditional knowledge and know-how related to the making and wearing of the Kyrgyz male hat" was inscribed in 2019 on the representative list of the intangible cultural heritage of humanity in December 2019.
