= Aytysh =

Song competition in Kazakh and Kyrgyz traditions

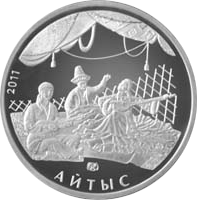
Aytysh competition

Aitysh (Note: Kyrgyz: Айтыш, romanized: Aitysh, pronounced [ɑjtʰɯ̆ɕ]; Kazakh: Айтыс, romanized: Aitys, pronounced [ɑjtə̆s]; Karakalpak: Aytıs; Bashkir: Әйтеш, romanized: Əyteş, pronounced [æjˈtɪ̞̆ʂ]; Turkish: Atışma, pronounced [aˈtɯʃma]; Uzbek: Айтишув, romanized: Aytishuv, pronounced [ajtɯ̆ʃuβ]) is the name for the primarily folk-oriented, oral tradition of improvised singing and oratory between two parties referred to in Kazakh as akyns, though it is found among virtually all Turkic peoples. Each akyn sits next to the other, while taking turns strumming a folk instrument, and responding with rhymed improvisational verses – komuz in Kyrgyz tradition, bağlama in Turkish tradition and dombra in Kazakh tradition, though some traditions such as Meykhana in Azerbaijan are mostly acapella. The bağlama-accompanied Anatolian variant is referred to as atışma (atyshma) in Turkish.

The term is most commonly references a public song competition between aqyns. The practice of aytysh began primarily as a folk tradition before being adopted by akyns who later expanded the genre's form and themes to include national epics, heroic stories of national history, and patriotic narratives. According to researcher, the aytys is an embodiment of the mindset and worldview of the Kazakh nomads. Although rehearsed sections were part of the competition, those who could improvise and respond in witty, historically mindful, and inventive ways to their opponents won the most praise from the audience.

== History ==
The style may have originated from other styles like the Kazakh domestic song form called zhar-zhar[rus] or the Kazakh folksong style of badik[kk]. Only in the 19th century was the aytysh formally recorded in ethnographic study, stories such as Birzhan and Sary[rus] and Ulbike and Kuderi among the first stories to be documented.

In 2001, the style of Aytysh was given formal protection in the form of the Aytysh Public Fund, and in 2015 the style was included in UNESCO's list of intangible world heritage.

The style has been put onto the international stage since the late 2000s when competitions began to be held. The first modern competition was held in Bishkek in 2008, following the following year but held in Osh.

== Themes ==
Topics used in aytysh are various but primarily revolve around social, cultural, political, and personal matters. However, several themes have been identified by researchers:

1. Badik - restorative folk song used to heal sickness
2. Songs dedicated to living and deceased individuals
3. Zhar-zhar - Songs dedicated to women in departure, primarily brides
4. Dealings between boys and girls
5. Conflict and argumentation
6. Family business and internal politics
7. Unknown or coded messaging
8. Religious comments and topics
9. Scripture texts
10. Contemporary events
