= Syrbai Maulenov =

Syrbai Maulenov (Kazakh: Сырбай Мәуленов, romanized: Syrbai Mäulenov; 17 September 1922 – 13 February 1993) was a Soviet and Kazakhstani poet and writer.

== Biography ==
In 1940 from the second year of the Kyzyl-Orda teacher training college he was called in ranks of RKKA. At the end of the same year he was exempted from a military duty through illness. In 1942 Maulenov was on the Volkhov Front in a rank of the lieutenant, was the deputy commander of a company by political part. In 1943 during break of blockade of Leningrad Maulenov was seriously injured and after treatment in hospital is invalided out. He was a member of Communist Party of the Soviet Union.

From 1943 to 1950 Maulenov worked as the deputy editor of the Kostanay regional newspaper, then — in the office of the Union of writers: was the editor-in-chief of the republican literary newspaper "Kazakh Adebiyeti", he was twice elected the secretary of the party organization of the joint venture of Kazakhstan. Nowadays is the editor-in-chief of the republican literary magazine Zhuldyz.

== Literary activity ==
The first collection of verses of Maulenov left in 1948, since then the poet published more than twenty five poetic books. The majority of works of Maulenov is translated into Russian and languages of the people of the USSR.

Books New Spring (1956), Blue Mountains (1964) are published in The Soviet Writer, and the book of verses Earth Milk left in the Spark appendix in Pravda publishing house.

In Young Guard publishing house in a series "Chosen lyrics" there was in 1967 a book of verses of Maulenov. In 1958 and in 1966 the book of the chosen works of the poet was issued.

The poet works in the field of transfer, its feather possesses transfers of verses of Alexander Pushkin, Mikhail Lermontov, Nikolay Nekrasov, Mikhail Lomonosov, Lord Byron, Vladimir Mayakovsky and a number of prominent poets of sister republics. Maulenov created some children's books, published two books of the publicistic articles written at different times.

== Merits ==
Maulenov deputy of Almaty city council. For merits in development of the Kazakh Soviet literature Maulenov is awarded by Certificates of honor of the Supreme Council of KAZSSR and the award "Honour Sign". For participation in war it is awarded by the medals "For Courage", "For Defense of Leningrad", "For a Victory over Germany" and others.
