= Kazakh wedding ceremony =

Element of culture of Kazakhstan

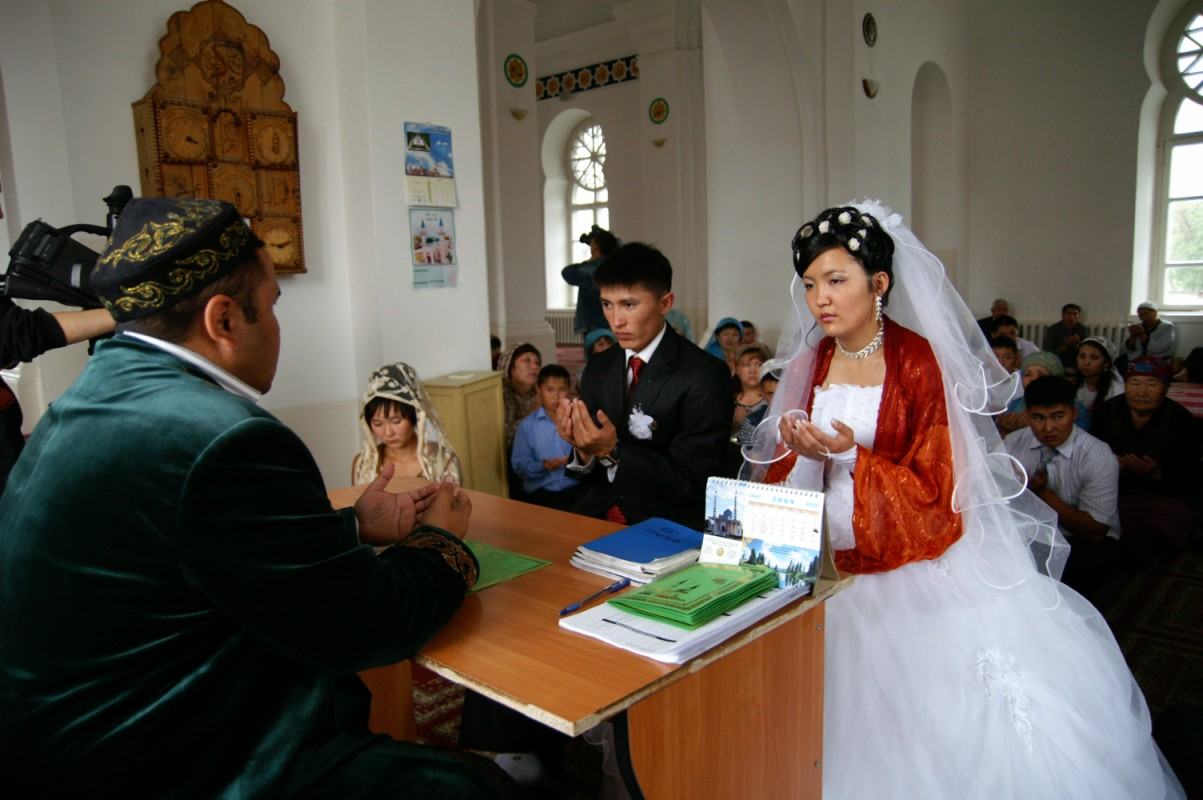
Kazakh wedding at a mosque in Semei, 2009

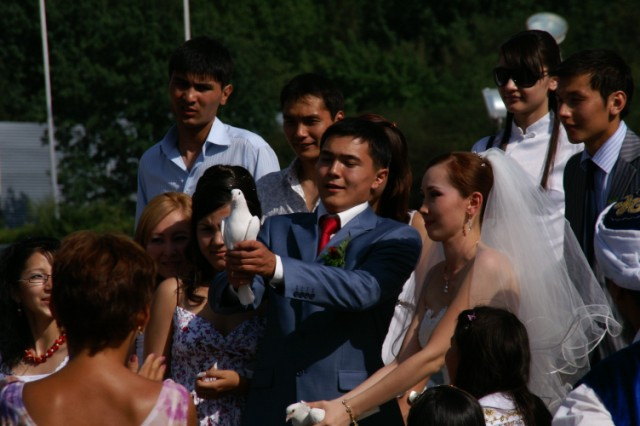
Kazakh newly-weds fly a dove at Independence Square, Almaty, 2008

A wedding in the Kazakh language is called an üilenu toiy (Kazakh: Үйлену тойы).

The religious part of the Kazakh wedding ceremony is called Neke Qiiu (Kazakh: Неке қию). The wedding process may take many weeks and even months to complete. This is because a Kazakh marriage, like marriages in most Muslim societies, involves a contract between families which requires negotiation. The neke qiiu is a small portion of the whole, and usually takes about a half an hour to complete.

The neke qiiu usually takes place on the evening of the day the bride is revealed to her groom's family. This festive ceremony is called betaşar (BYET-ah-shar; Kazakh: Беташар) or "revealing of the face". After she shows respect to her groom's family, the veil is lifted and the bride receives a kiss from her mother-in-law. The mother-in-law then puts a white scarf on her head to symbolize her marital status and then welcomes her into the groom's family.

After several hours a feasting, a mullah arrives. A mullah is a teacher of Islam who knows how to recite the Quran. He performs the neke qiiu. Even though the betaşar is performed outside in the garden in the presence of many relatives and friends, the Neke Qiiu is performed inside with close relatives only. The mullah and the couple sit facing one another. He briefly recites some verses from the Quran and asks the couple to confess the faith of Islam. When this ceremony is done, the couple must go and register their marriage at the state registry office, a practice introduced in the Soviet period.

The brief ceremony occurs at the civil registration office, which is called AHAJ (Kazakh: Азаматтық Халық Актілерін Жазу (АХАЖ), Russian: ЗАГС). The wedding also features a procession of cars decorated in ribbons, which stops to take pictures along the way.

== See also ==
- Culture of Kazakhstan
- Toi music
