= Orteke =

Kazakh musical performance

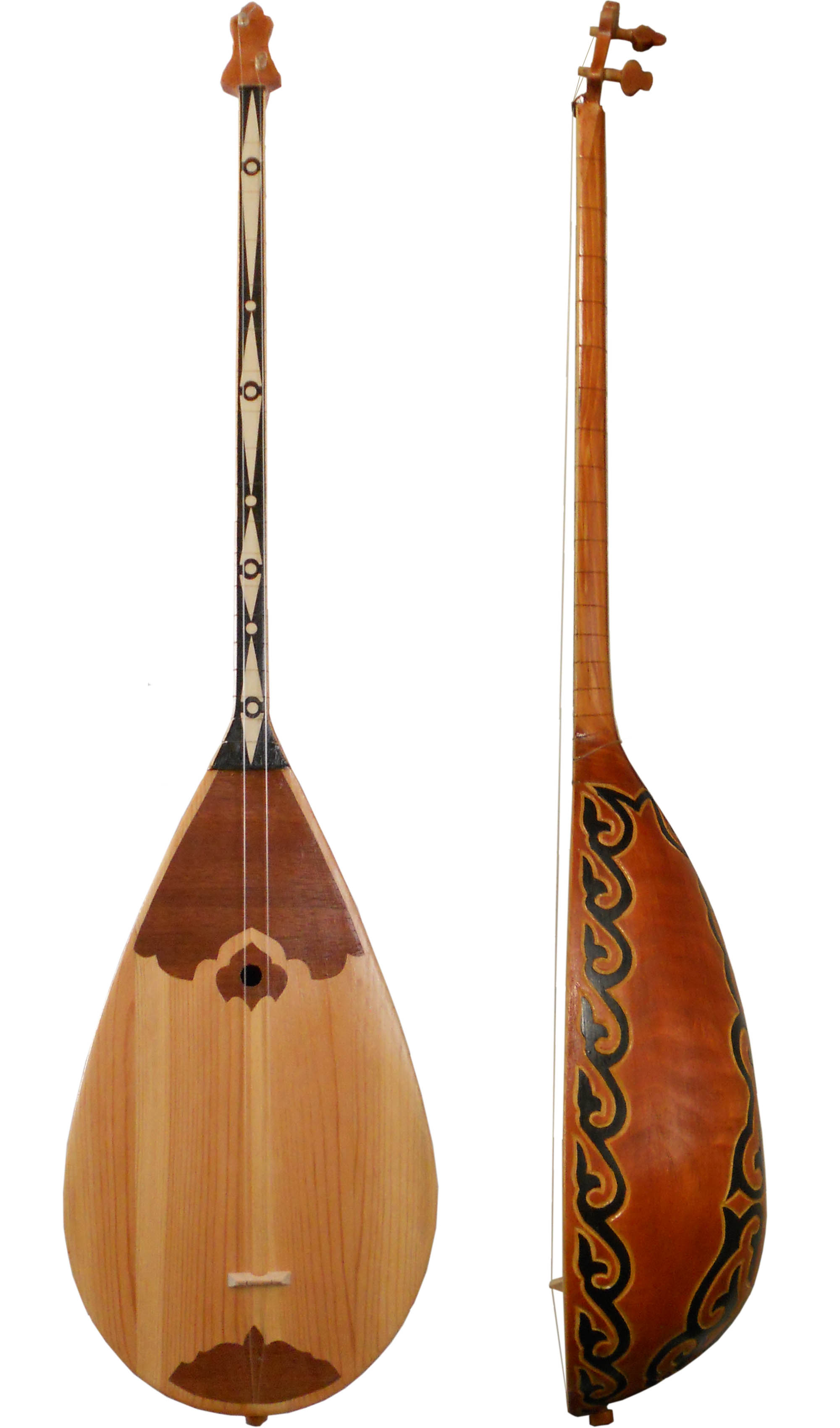
A Kazakh dombra, which is used to perform orteke

Orteke (Kazakh: ортеке) is a form of traditional performance in Kazakhstan that incorporates puppetry, music, and dance.

Possibly dating back thousands of years, the technique originated in southwestern Kazakhstan and spread among other Central Asian nomadic communities in places like Uzbekistan. The name "orteke" combines or (ditch, hole, trap) and teke (goat).

Some ethnographers argue the Orteke began as a shamanic tool to distract spirits or to act as a "spirit vessel" during healing rituals.

In orteke, a musician playing a two-stringed dombra has a wooden puppet attached to their fingers by sticks and strings. The puppet, usually shaped like a horned mountain goat, is attached to the top of a drum, often a dauylpaz. As the musician plays, the puppet moves to the rhythm, creating a drumbeat. Experienced orteke performers can incorporate several puppets at once using both hands and feet. They can also incorporate wind instruments, such as a sazsyrnay or shankobyz.

Orteke players traditionally learn their craft through apprenticeships, although local academics have begun to study it as well. After a period of obscurity and near-extinction, efforts to promote Kazakh national identity have revived interest in the art form.

In 2022, orteke was added to UNESCO's Representative List of the Intangible Cultural Heritage of Humanity.
