= Kuurdak =

Central Asian meat dish

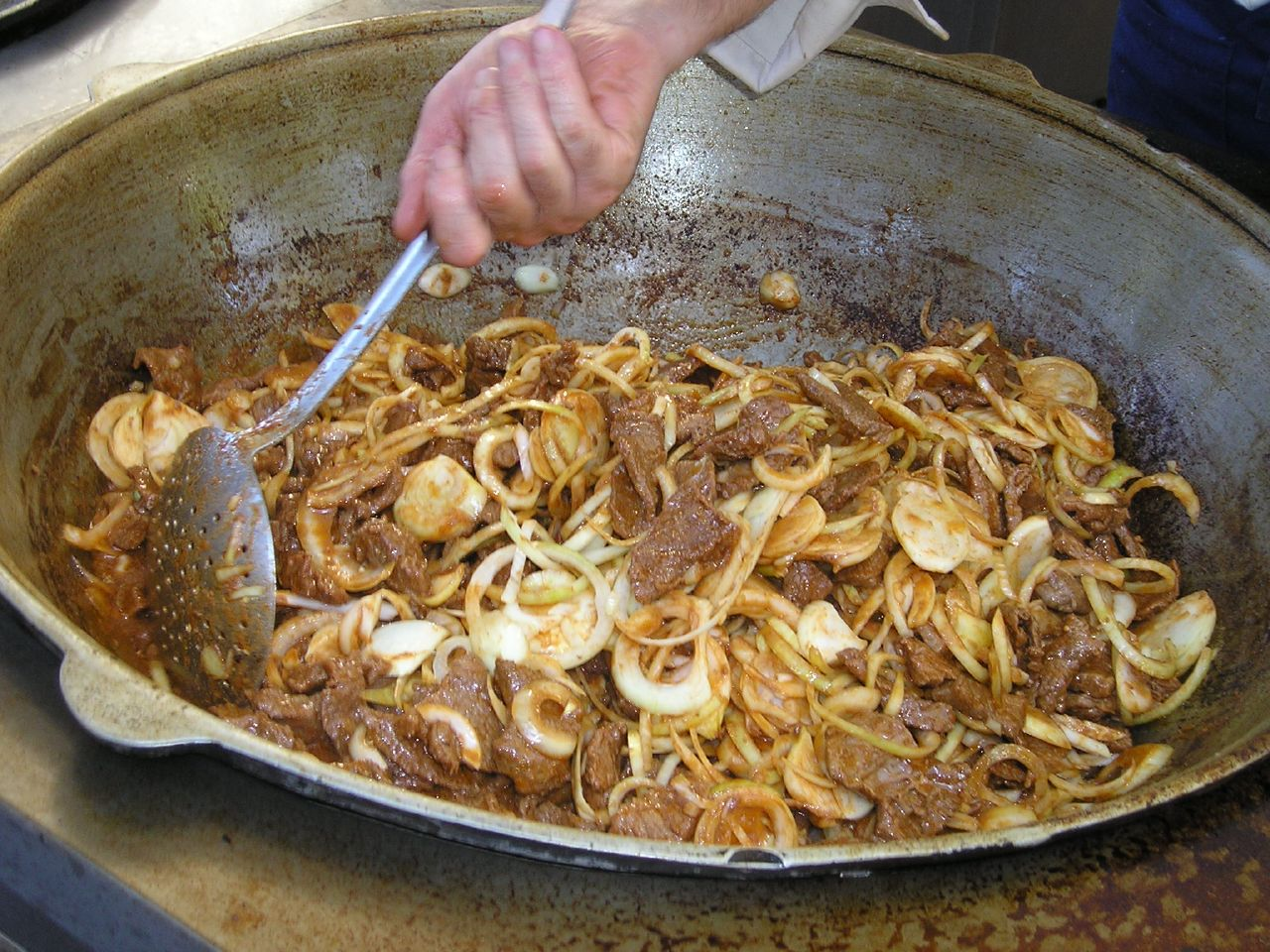
- Kuurdak being prepared
- Place of origin: Mongolia, Kyrgyzstan, Kazakhstan, Uzbekistan, Turkmenistan
- Region or state: Central Asia, Mongolia
- Main ingredients: mutton, onion, vegetable oil or animal fat

Kuurdak (Kazakh: қуырдақ, quyrdaq, Kyrgyz: куурдак, Turkmen: gowurdak; Говурдак, Uyghur: قورداق қордақ qordaq, Uzbek: qovurdoq, Mongolian: Хуурдаг), transliterated with various spellings, is a traditional meat dish made in Central Asia and Mongolia.

It is similar to kavurma in Turkish cuisine, and tokány in Hungarian cuisine.

== Name ==
The dish's name comes from a nominalization of the Kyrgyz word "kuuruu", meaning "frying" and "roasted," referring to how the food is made.

== History ==
Kuurdak was served by ancient Central Asian nomads, who prepared it with newly slaughtered sheep and little to no vegetable oil, prioritizing animal fats. Potatoes were introduced to the region in the 19th century and have since been a common addition to the dish, though they are less popular in Uzbek and Turkmen variations.

In May 2025, the dish was listed among the World’s Top 50 Offal Dishes by Taste Atlas.

== Ingredients and varieties ==
Kuurdak is traditionally made from fried meat and offal. It is described as "stewed brown meat," commonly seasoned with onions and garlic. Modern recipes frequently use vegetable oil and potatoes as opposed to old customary means.

== See also ==
- List of lamb dishes
