= Echpochmak =

Tatar and Bashkir national turnover dish

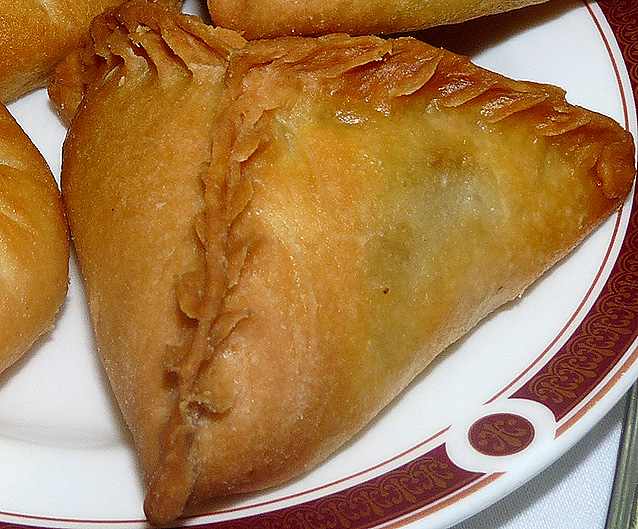
- Alternative names: Öçpoçmaq, Uchpuchmak, Ochpochmak, (rus.) treugolnik
- Course: Main course
- Place of origin: Russia
- Region or state: Volga Region, Tatarstan, Bashkortostan
- Main ingredients: Dough; Meat; Potato; Onion

Echpochmak, ocpocmaq, ochpochmaq, ochpochmak, uchpochmak, oechpochmaq, uchpuchmak, ucpucmak or treugolnik (Tatar: өчпочмак, romanized: öçpoçmaq, Bashkir: өсбосмаҡ, romanized: ösbosmaq, pronounced [ʏs.bʊs.mɑ́q], lit. 'triangle') (Note: Also transliterated as öçpoçmaq, ochpochmak, echpochmak, uchpuchmak; sometimes known as treugolnik (треугольник) among the Russian population.) is a Tatar and Bashkir national dish, an essential food in Tatar and Bashkir culture. It is a triangular turnover, filled with chopped meat, onion and potatoes. Echpochmak is usually eaten with bouillon or with tea.

Echpochmaks have been cooked for centuries by nomad Turkic people. Lamb, and, sometimes, horse meat was used to make a triangular pie. An opening on the top was used to add broth immediately before eating which made it a hot meal. This made cooking in the field fast and easy.

For most of the Soviet period, much of the Tatar cuisine including echpochmaks was removed from public catering due to regulations. In the late 60s, Yunus Ahmetjanov, a legendary chef pushed for recognition of echpochmak, chakchak and other Tatar meals on the unionwide level and was successful in promoting them to public catering menus all across the Soviet Union.

Presently, echpochmaks are often made without an opening, however, it is still served with meat broth in a separate bowl. Beef is the prevalent filling today; other varieties contain goose and duck meat.

== See also ==
- Tatar böreği in Turkey
- Fatayer
- List of pastries
- List of Russian dishes
- Pasty
- Peremech
- Qistibi
- Samsa
- Samosa
