= Tatar cuisine =

Cuisine of the Tatar people

Tatar cuisine is primarily the cuisine of the Volga Tatars, who live in Tatarstan, Russia, and surrounding areas.

== History ==
The cuisine of the Volga Tatars takes its origin from the cuisine of the Volga Bulgars, who once were nomads, but nearly 1500 years ago turned to agriculture and assimilated into local agricultural societies.

Tatar cuisine was influenced by the surrounding peoples – Russians, Mari, Udmurts, and also peoples of Central Asia, especially Uzbeks. Dishes such as pilaw (pilaf), halvah (xälwä), and sherbet (Tatar: şirbät) entered long ago into the Tatar culture. Tatars became familiar with many elements of Russian cuisine early in their history. However, culinary influences and greater variety of products have not changed the basic ethnic features of Tatar cuisine but have instead made it more diverse.

Geography and nature were also instrumental in the shaping of the Tatar cuisine. The location of the Tatars at the border of two geographical zones—the northern forests and the southern steppe—and also in the basin of two large rivers—the Volga and the Kama—encouraged trade and considerably enriched the national cuisine. The Tatars became acquainted early in their history with rice, tea, dried fruits, walnuts, seasonings, and spices.

The Tatar cuisine relies heavily on the main agricultural products of the region—cereals and livestock. Fruits and vegetables were much less developed in the region's agriculture, although the relative importance of the potato began to increase from the end of the 19th century. Local vegetables included onions, carrot, horseradish, turnips, pumpkins, beets and, in small quantities, also cucumbers and cabbage. Fruits were mainly grown in orchards on the right bank of the Volga, including local apple, cherries, raspberries, and currants. The forests were a source for wild berries, walnuts, hops, cow parsnip, sorrel, mint, and common wild leeks. Mushrooms were not typical in traditional Tatar cooking, and they began to be used only recently, especially among the urban population. Cattle and sheep provided beef and mutton, both equally popular among the Tatars. Horse meat was eaten boiled, salted, and cured. Milk was used primarily in dairy products, such as curds, sour cream, etc. Poultry was widespread in local farms (chickens, geese), and eggs were a popular dish, eaten in various forms. Beekeeping in the forest-steppe belt produced an abundance of honey for local consumption.

== Traditional Tatar cuisine ==
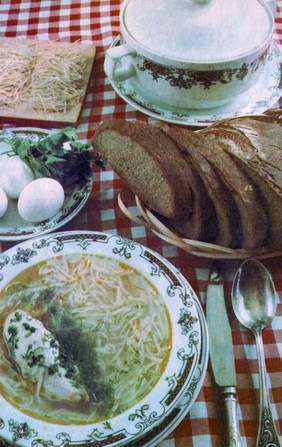
Şulpa with noodles

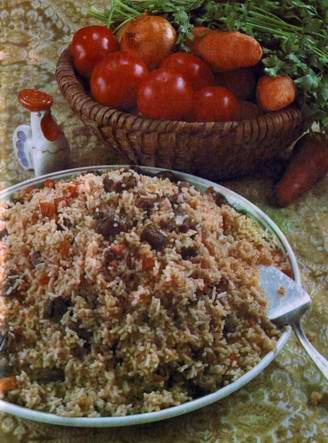
Pilaw (pilaf)

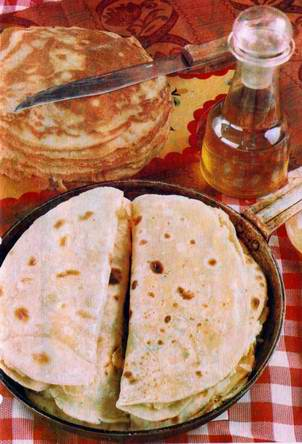
Qıstıbí

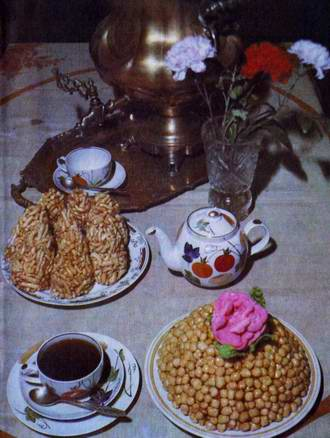
Boxara käläwäse and çäkçäk

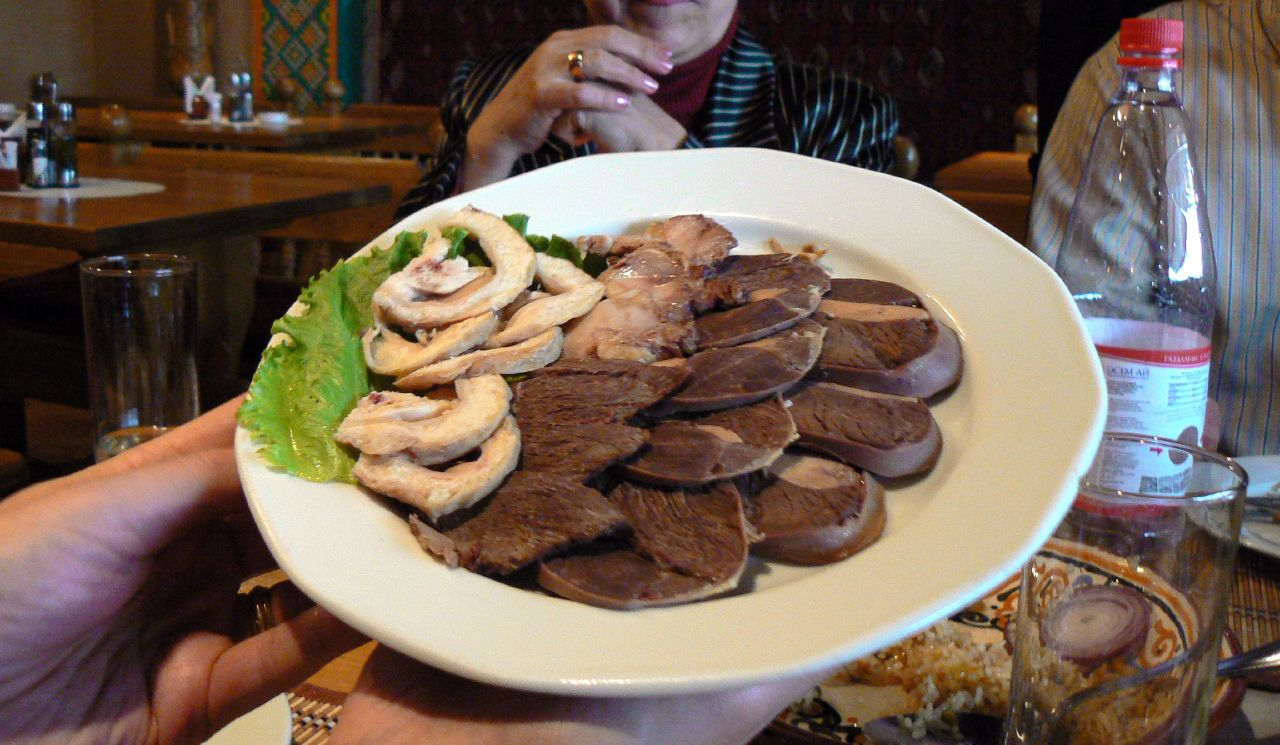
Qazılıq as part of a horsemeat platter (on the right)

The dishes in Tatar cuisine can be subdivided into the following categories:

- hot soups,
- main courses,
- baked items with a savory filling (also eaten as main course),
- dough-based dishes (pasta),
- sweet baked items and other sweets, usually served with tea.

=== Soups ===
Depending on the broth (şulpa) used as the soup base, soups are divided into meat, chicken, fish, vegetable, mushroom, etc. The soup may be thickened with noodles, grains, or vegetables – separately or in combination. Particularly popular is noodle soup served with toqmaç (homemade noodles) and enriched with pieces of boiled meat or chicken from the broth.

Soups are often served with meat balls or stuffed buns (öçpoçmaq, pärämäç, bawırsaq). A festive and to a certain extent ceremonial dish for the Tatar is pilmän (pelmeni in Russian), a kind of dumpling filled with meat and always served in a clear soup.

=== Main courses ===
Main dishes are usually based on meat, grains, and potatoes. Meat or chicken boiled in the broth is cut into small pieces and served as a main course, sometimes quickly fried in oil with onions, carrots, and bell peppers. Boiled potatoes are a favorite side dish, with grated horseradish served as an accompaniment. A chicken stuffed with eggs in milk (tutırğan tawıq) is a special dish for holidays.

Bäliş is the oldest traditional dish combining meat and grains. Pieces of fat meat (mutton, beef, goose, or goose and duck innards) are combined with grains (millet, spelt, rice) and baked in a crock. Tutırma, an intestine filled with finely cut or chopped liver and millet or rice, is another combination of meat and grains.

Pilaw (pilaf) is served at dinner parties, especially in the city. A popular local version is the so-called Kazan pilaw prepared with boiled meat. Dishes combining boiled meat with noodles include qullama or bişbarmaq, common for many Turkic peoples. Meat is stored in the winter naturally frozen; it is preserved for the spring and the summer by salting or curing. Horse meat is used to make sausages (qazılıq); cured goose and duck are considered a delicacy.

Poultry eggs, primarily those of chickens, are a very popular dish in Tatar cuisine. They are eaten boiled, fried, and baked.

Grains are made into a variety of porridges: millet, buckwheat, oatmeal, rice, peas, etc.

=== Baked foods ===
A wide variety of dough dishes is a feature of the traditional Tatar cuisine. Unleavened dough is traditionally used for buns, both sweet and savory, flatbreads, and biscuits. Leavened yeast dough is used to make bread (ikmäk, ipi), which is always served with meals. Bread was traditionally baked from rye flour, and only the wealthy could afford wheat bread. Today, both wheat and rye bread are found in stores.

Qabartma is a kind of yeast dough pancake that may be prepared in different ways: baked in a pan in front of an open oven fire, or fried in boiling oil in a cauldron. Qabartma is eaten hot, thickly spread with butter.

Liquid batter is also prepared with and without yeast. Pancakes (qoymaq) are made from unleavened batter using wheat flour. Bliny-style pancakes are made from yeast batter using different types of flour (oats, peas, buckwheat, millet, wheat, or mixed). Yeast-batter qoymaq is thicker than the Russian bliny. It is usually served for breakfast, accompanied by melted butter in a small dish.

Various baked items with a savory filling are specific for the Tatar cuisine. The oldest and simplest is qıstıbí, also called küzikmäk. This is an unleavened pancake folded into two and filled with cooked millet. Since the end of the 19th century, qıstıbí has been made with mashed potatoes. Bäleş made from unleavened or fermented dough is filled with pieces of fatty meat (mutton, beef, goose, duck, etc.) mixed with grains or potatoes. Bäleş used to be made for special occasions in the shape of a low truncated cone with an opening on top. Subsequently, the name began to be used for ordinary pies with different fillings, similar to the Russian pirog. Another traditional Tatar pie is öçpoçmaq, a triangular shell originally filled with a mixture of fatty meat and onions. Later pieces of potato began to be added to the filling. Pärämäç (peremech) is a round-shaped minced meat pie, fried and served hot sprinkled with melted butter. Except for the round shape, it is similar to the çibörek (cheburek) of the Crimean Tatars.

Bäkkän (or täkä), particularly widespread in rural areas, is an individual oval or crescent-shaped pie (like large pirozhki), filled with various vegetables (mainly pumpkin, also carrots or cabbage). Sumsa is a similar pie, usually with a meat and rice filling. A special festive dish among urban Kazan Tatars is göbädiä, a tall round pie with a multilayer filling, which includes rice, dried fruits, and qort (a kind of dried salty cheese).

=== Sweets ===
The Tatar cuisine offers a variety of baked sweets, usually served with tea: çelpek (deep-fried pancakes), qatlama (a baked roll with a variety of fillings – poppy seeds, sesame seeds, qort, nuts), qoş tele ("bird's tongue", deep-fried squares or diamonds of unleavened dough), lawaş (fried dumplings filled with raisins), paştet (sweet pies filled with jam or dried fruits) etc. Çäkçäk (chakchak, chak-chak, or chek-chek) is a mound of honey-drenched sweet pastry balls, common among all Turkic peoples. It used to be a ceremonial food brought by the bride to the reception at the bridegroom's home. Today it is a common sweet. Honey is very popular in baking and on its own, served with tea.

=== Beverages ===
Äyrän (ayran) is a dairy drink made by diluting qatıq (katyk, sour milk) with cold water. Quas (kvass) is a beverage made from rye flour and malt that the Tatars have borrowed from the Russians. A kompot of dried apricots is a popular dessert at dinner parties.

Another non-alcoholic sweet beverage is sherbet (Tatar: şirbät) made from honey. In the 19th and early 20th century it was a purely ceremonial drink, served to wedding guests as the "bride's sherbet" in the bridegroom's home.

Tea is a typical hospitality beverage among the Tatars. They drink hot, strong tea, usually with milk. Tea with baked sweets (qabartma, pancakes) sometimes replaces cooked breakfast.

== Cooking methods and utensils ==
Food is prepared in traditional Tatar cuisine mainly by boiling, frying, and baking. Frying is primarily used for dough-based foods, much less for meats, which are typically boiled (except meat for pilaw, which requires quick frying). Both boiling and frying were traditionally done in a cast-iron cauldron built into the side of the large kitchen stove. Baking was done in an oven. Cooking over an open fire was not common. This method was used for making pancakes (täçe qoymaq) and fried eggs (täbä).

Cast-iron utensils and crock pots were commonly used in the oven. Large deep cast-iron pans served to bake bäleş and göbädiä. Wooden utensils were widely used for various tasks. Bread dough was kneaded in wooden troughs and then allowed to rise in wooden or wicker bowls. Butter was made in wooden churns. Honey and qatiq were stored in wooden containers. Commercially manufactured kitchen utensils, including metallic and enameled pots and pans, china, and glassware, became increasingly accepted starting in the middle of the 19th century.

Tea service has always been the subject of special attention among the Tatar. Tea is drunk from small cups (so that it remains hot). Typical Tatar cups are small and low, with a rounded bottom and a saucer. The traditional Tatar tea service invariably includes a samovar.

The introduction of modern gas stoves and microwave ovens has led to the adoption of new cooking techniques, mainly increasing the popularity of frying (meat, fish, vegetables). The modernization of kitchenware has deprived cauldrons, cast iron pans, and many wooden utensils of their traditional role. The average family now uses a wide range of aluminum and enameled cookware.

== Modern cuisine ==
The Tatar cuisine, while preserving the national traditions, has undergone substantial changes. Economic and cultural changes have introduced many new dishes, enriching the traditional cuisine. More fruits and vegetables are now used than traditionally, fish has become more popular, mushrooms, tomatoes, and pickles are in common use. The opening up of international trade has given access to fruits and vegetables that were previously regarded as exotic, including bananas, kiwi, mangoes, and eggplant.

== Anglicized names of Tatar dishes ==
- Äyrän – ayran
- Bäleş – belesh
- Bäkkän – bekken
- Bawırsaq – bavyrsak
- Börek – burek
- Çäkçäk – chakchak
- Chee-börek – chiburekki
- Göbädiä – gubadia
- Öçpoçmaq – echpochmak, ochpochmak
- Pärämäç – peremech
- Pilmän – pilmen
- Qıstıbí – kystybyi
- Şulpa – shulpa
- Toqmaç – tokmach
- Tutırğan tawıq – tutyrgan tavyk
- Tutırma – tutyrma
- Ulish – өлеш

== See also ==
- Crimean Tatar cuisine
- Russian cuisine
- Udmurt cuisine
