= Beaune (disambiguation) =

Beaune is a commune in France.

Beaune may also refer to:

== People ==
- Renaud de Beaune (1527–1606), French Catholic ecclesiastic
- Florimond de Beaune (1601–1652), French jurist and mathematician
- Michel Beaune (1933–1990), French actor
- Colette Beaune (born 1943), French historian
- Christine Pires-Beaune (born 1964), French politician
- Clément Beaune (born 1981), French politician
- Hallie Beaune, author

== Places ==
- Arrondissement of Beaune
- Canton of Beaune
- Beaune, a tributary of the Loing

== Wines ==
- Beaune wine
- Burgundy wine

== Other uses ==
- Beaune FC
