= Fred Eckhardt =

American brewer and writer (1926–2015)

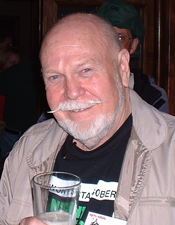
- Beer writer Fred Eckhardt enjoying a beer at Houston's annual "Dixie Cup" festival.
- Born: Fred Eckhardt; May 10, 1926; Everett, WA, US
- Died: August 10, 2015 (aged 89)
- Occupations: Homebrewer and Beer Journalist
- Known for: Writing about Beer and Sake

Otto Frederick Eckhardt (May 10, 1926 – August 10, 2015) was an American brewer, homebrewing advocate, and writer. Eckhardt is best remembered as a pioneer in the field of beer journalism, publishing a series of articles and books on the topic, including the seminal 1989 tome, The Essentials of Beer Style. At the time of his death in 2015, Eckhardt was memorialized as "the Dean of American beer writers".

== Biography ==
=== Early years ===
Otto Fredrick Eckhardt, known to family and friends as "Fred", was born William Wright Cudahy on May 10, 1926 in San Francisco, California and adopted by a family from Everett, Washington. He didn't know he was adopted until he was a teenager. He was in a children's home from ages 10–15 and enlisted in the U.S. Marine Corps when he was 17, where he worked as a radio operator in Okinawa during WWII and the South Pacific during the Korean War.

Eckhardt was first exposed to the homebrewing of beer by his stepfather, who produced his own low quality beverage during the years of Prohibition in the United States. Eckhardt never developed a taste for the brew, however, recalling many decades later that it and the other home-made beers of the Great Depression years "earned an honest reputation as abysmal". Nevertheless, this aspect of his early life would later prove to be formative when he himself became interested in the brewing art in the late 1960s.

=== Brewer and writer ===
Eckhardt experimented with beer brewing starting in 1968, when he began modifying the recipe of a Vancouver, British Columbia brew shop owner and refining his technique. He served as a mentor for people who made beer, wine, and sake at home, including customers and staff at F.H. Steinbart, the oldest homebrew store in the United States.

He wrote hundreds of beer columns for outlets such as The Seattle Times, The Oregonian, Celebrator, Zymurgy, and All About Beer, and published his own newsletters (Amateur Brewer, Listen to Your Beer, Talk to Your Beer, Sake Connection). In 1968, Eckhardt rewrote a recipe created by Stanley Anderson, who owned a homebrew shop in Vancouver Washington; he brought it to Wine-Art, a homebrew shop in Portland, Oregon and the owner suggested he should write a homebrewing book. It was with this 1970 book, A Treatise on Lager Beers: How to Make Good Beer at Home, that Eckhardt rose to fame; notably, this hobby was still illegal because of post-Prohibition regulations. This book was originally published by Blitz-Weinhard brewery and included 70 German recipes. Eckhardt later released The Essentials of Beer Style: A Catalog of Classic Beer Styles for Brewers & Beer Enthusiasts in 1989 and Sake (U.S.A.): A Complete Guide to American Sake, Sake Breweries and Homebrewed Sake in 1992.

He wrote about brewed beverages—beer and sake, and wrote the 1989 book, The Essentials of Beer Style. He is identified as a "beer writer", a "beer historian", and as a "beer critic". He was a local celebrity in Portland, Oregon, which Eckhardt described as "the brewing capital of the world".

Eckhardt was nationally known as a "beer personality" and as a "beer guru". His success as a local character was the foundation for fame on a wider stage. A typical niche profile describes him as a "beer mensch:"

"Fred is [an eighty-two] year old former Marine Buddhist who teaches swimming classes to children back in his native Portland, Oregon. . . . He wrote a book on how to homebrew lagers in 1969, ten years before homebrewing was relegalized. His 1989 book, The Essentials of Beer Style, has become a kind of Rosetta Stone for homebrewers and those who judge homebrew competitions. "Eckhardt (as mentioned by Ken Wells of The Wall Street Journal) is a soft-spoken, diminutive, roundish man with blue twinkling eyes and a white mustache and goatee. Imagine Shakespeare's Puck reborn as a beer mensch."

Eckhardt considered himself as an educator.

=== Beer publicist ===
Eckhardt developed a national reputation as someone knowledgeable about American homebrewed beer. He was a featured lecturer and competition judge at "The Dixie Cup" in Houston, Texas. This annual event is the final competition in the series that determines

- the Lone Star Circuit Homebrewer of the Year
- the Lone Star Circuit Homebrew Team of the Year
- the Lone Star Circuit Homebrew Club of the Year.

The Dixie Cup is one of the Qualifying Events for the Masters Championship of Amateur Brewing.

Eckhardt wrote articles on beer, brewing, and other miscellany in Celebrator Beer News and in All About Beer.

Fred was a National judge in the Beer Judge Certification Program.

=== Sake publicist ===
Eckhardt was an advocate and publicist for American sake. Drawing on his experience in beer competitions, he created a set of guidelines for sake tasting competitions. He published a sake newsletter several times each year; and he authored Sake (U.S.A.): A Complete Guide to American Sake, Sake Breweries and Homebrewed Sake. While the rest of the world may be drinking more sake and the quality of sake has been increasing, sake production has been declining in Japan since the mid-1970s. The increase in American production for domestic consumption and export has been, in part, affected by the lower cost of rice compared with Japan; but other more difficult-to-analyze factors are important.

At present, sake homebrewing is not allowed under Japanese law. Eckhardt foresees that his book, which spells out how homebrewing might reinvigorate sake consumption in Japan. His optimism is informed in part by the unanticipated expansion of micro-breweries in Oregon since the state law prohibiting them was repealed in 1985.

=== Death and legacy ===
Fred Eckhardt died August 10, 2015, of congestive heart failure at his home in Portland, Oregon. His partner of 62 years James Itsuo (Jimmy) Takita, retired science reference librarian of the Multnomah County Library, died three months earlier.

Eckhardt's meticulously collected papers, consisting of 30 boxes of published articles, drafts, photographs, and correspondence, are housed at the Special Collections and Archives Research Center at Oregon State University in Corvallis, Oregon, where they are part of the Oregon Hops and Brewing Archives (OHBA). Included in the collection are physical copies which Eckhardt made of all his email correspondence. Also part of Eckhardt's papers were extensive runs of the pioneer home brewing journals Celebrator Beer News, All About Beer, and Zymurgy.

== Works ==
- A Treatise on Lager Beers: How to Make Good Beer at Home. Portland, OR: Fred Eckhardt Communications, 1970; reissued 1983.
- The Essentials of Beer Style: A Catalog of Classic Beer Styles for Brewers & Beer Enthusiasts. Portland, OR: Fred Eckhardt Communications, 1989.
- Sake (U.S.A.): A Complete Guide to American Sake, Sake Breweries and Homebrewed Sake. Portland, OR: Fred Eckhardt Communications, 1992.
