= Carboy =

Rigid container for liquids

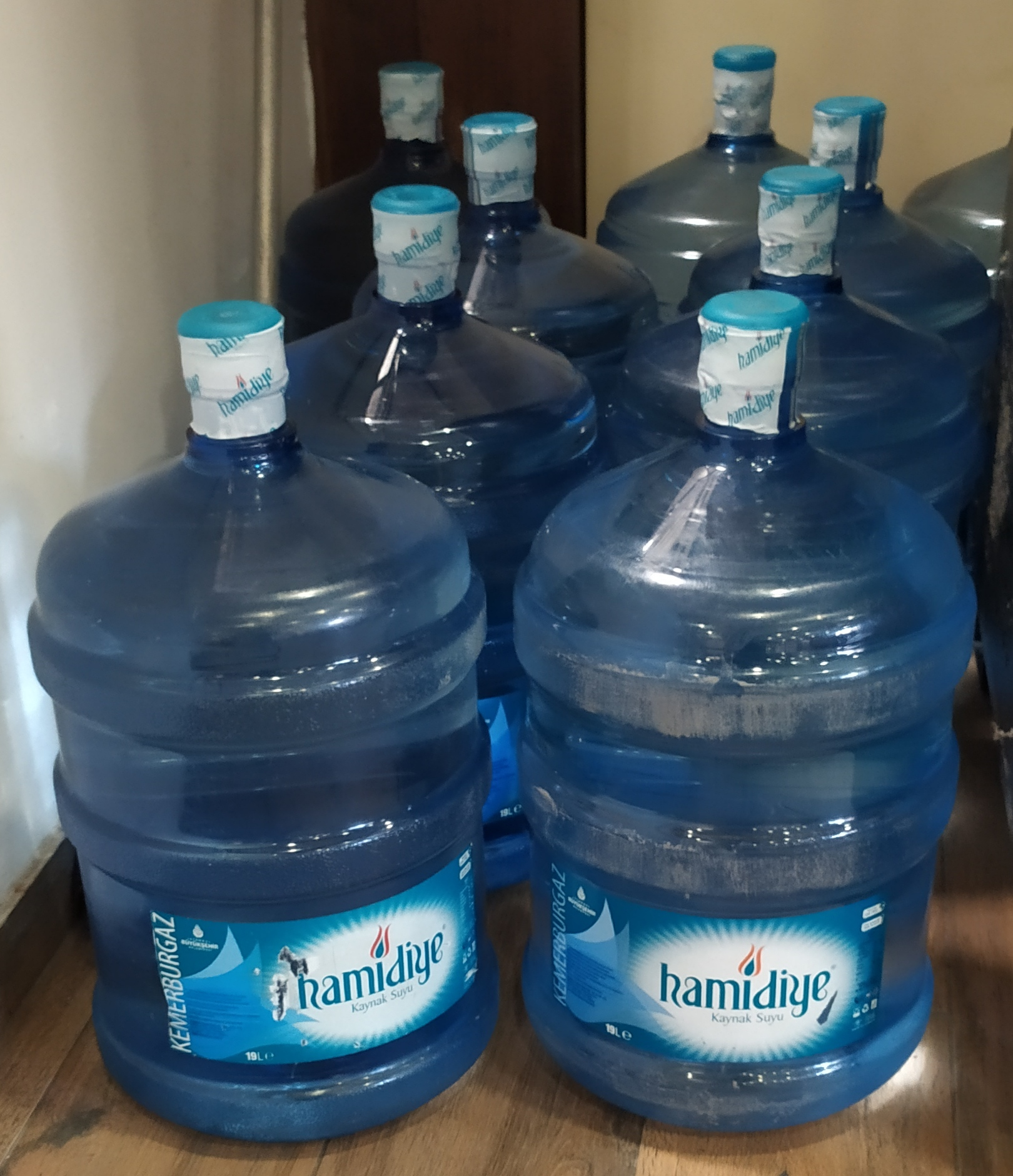
Large plastic bottles for a water dispenser

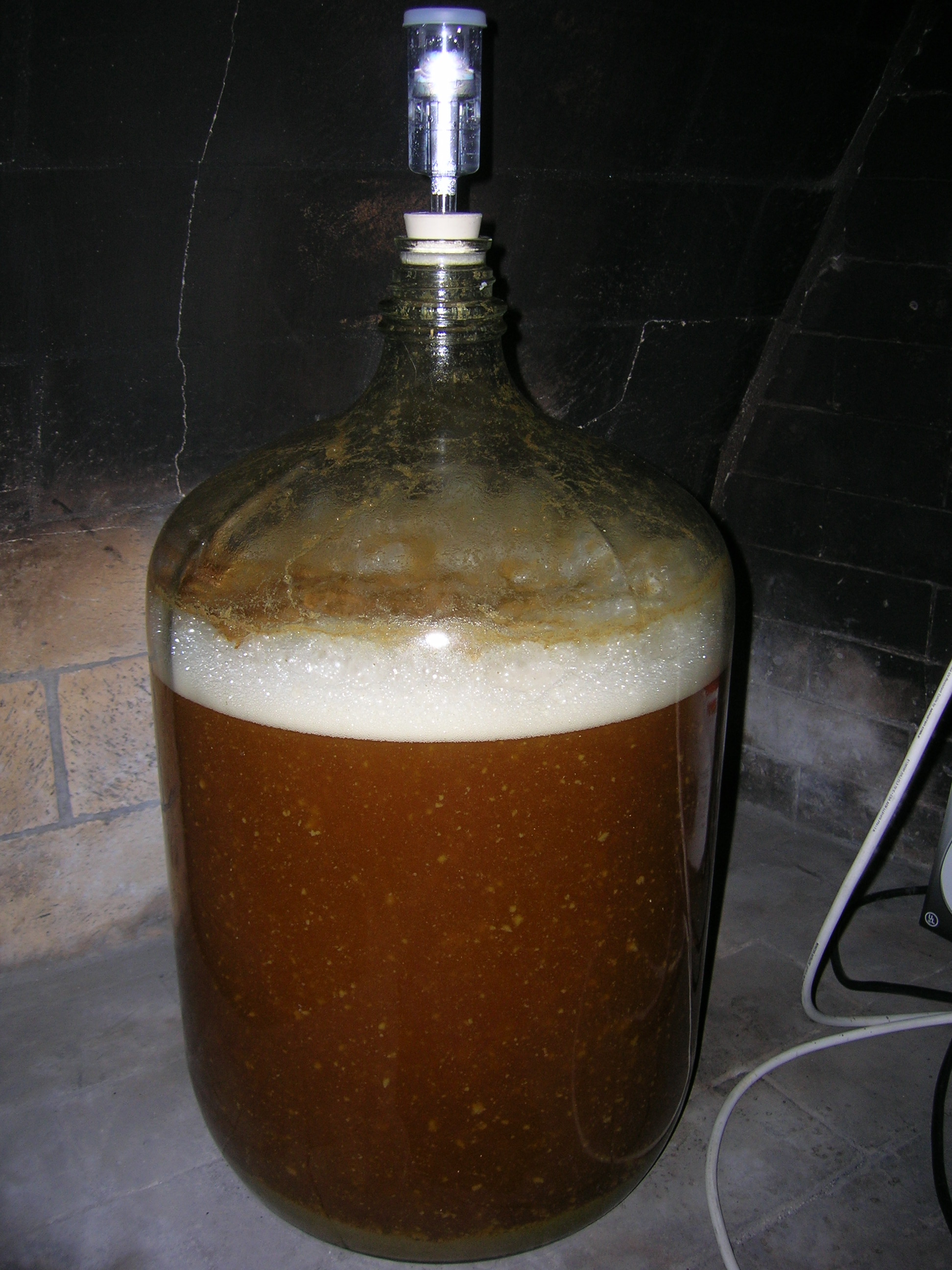
A 25 L (6 1/2 US gal) glass carboy acting as a fermentation vessel for beer. It is fitted with a fermentation lock.

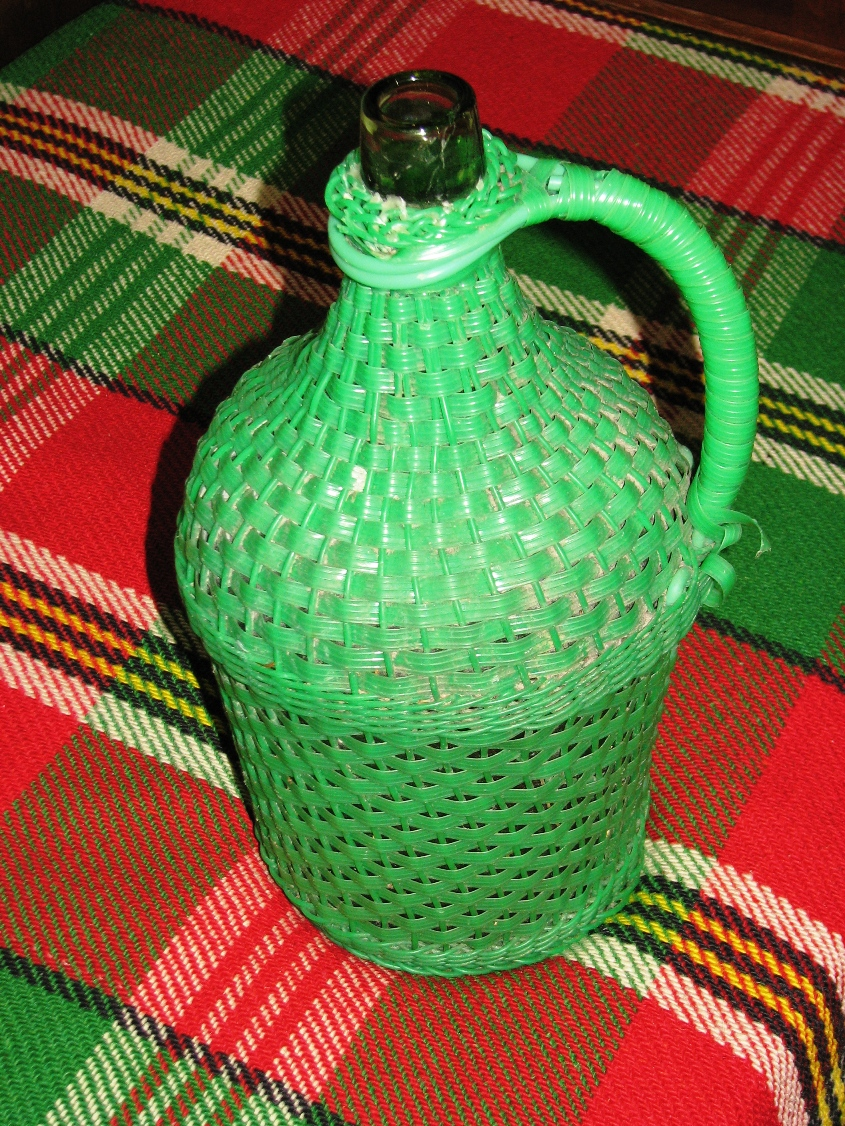
A Bulgarian demijohn (damadzhana)

A carboy, also known as a demijohn, is a rigid container with a typical capacity of 4 to 60 litres (1 to 16 US gal). Carboys are primarily used for transporting liquids, often drinking water or chemicals.

They are also used for in-home fermentation of beverages, often beer or wine.

== History and etymology ==
The word carboy is from the Persian qarābah (قرابه), from Middle Persian Karāvah. Arabic also borrowed it as qarrāba, meaning "big jug". The Spanish-language term is garrafa. English carafe is an etymological doublet via Italian and French.

Demijohn originally referred to any glass vessel with a large body and small neck, enclosed in wickerwork. The word presumably comes from the French dame-jeanne, literally "Lady Jane", as a popular appellation; this word is first attested in France in the 17th century. In Italian it is called damigiana, most probably derived from French. In some Spanish-speaking countries such as Argentina, it is also referred to as damajuana.

== Size ==
Carboy volumes range from 4 to 25 L (1 to 7 US gal). The term carboy itself usually indicates a 5 US gal (19 L) size, unless otherwise noted. A 1 imp gal (4.5 L) carboy is sometimes called a jug. A 15 US gal (57 L) carboy is normally called a demijohn (in the Philippines, dama juana). In Britain, "demijohn" refers to a 1-imperial-gallon (4.5 L) glass brewing vessel.

== Brewing ==
In brewing, a carboy or demijohn is a glass or plastic vessel used in fermenting beverages such as wine, mead, cider, perry, and beer. It is usually fitted with a rubber stopper and a fermentation lock to prevent bacteria and oxygen from entering during the fermentation process.

During the homebrewing process, a primary carboy is used for fermentation. Once primary fermentation is complete, the beer is either transferred to a secondary carboy for conditioning or it can be transferred directly to bottles for conditioning. (This process of transferring is usually called racking.)

== Laboratory ==
In modern laboratories, carboys are usually made of plastic, though traditionally they were (and still are in many university settings) made of ferric glass or other shatter-resistant glasses immune to acid corrosion or halide staining common in older plastic formulations. They are used for storing large quantities of liquids, such as solvents or deionised water. In these applications, a tap may be included for dispensing. Carboys are also used to collect and store waste solvents. Collecting waste solvents in plastic carboys is preferable to reusing glass Winchesters due to the lesser chance of breakage if a solution is placed in an incorrectly labeled carboy. Polypropylene carboys are also commonly used in laboratories to transfer purified water. They are typically filled at the top and have a spigot at the bottom for dispensing.

== See also ==
- Amphora – another large container used from 6000 BCE to the present, mostly for wine
- Fermentation (food)
- Jerrycan – another large-sized fluid container
