= Homebrewing =

Small scale brewing of beer, mead, ciders

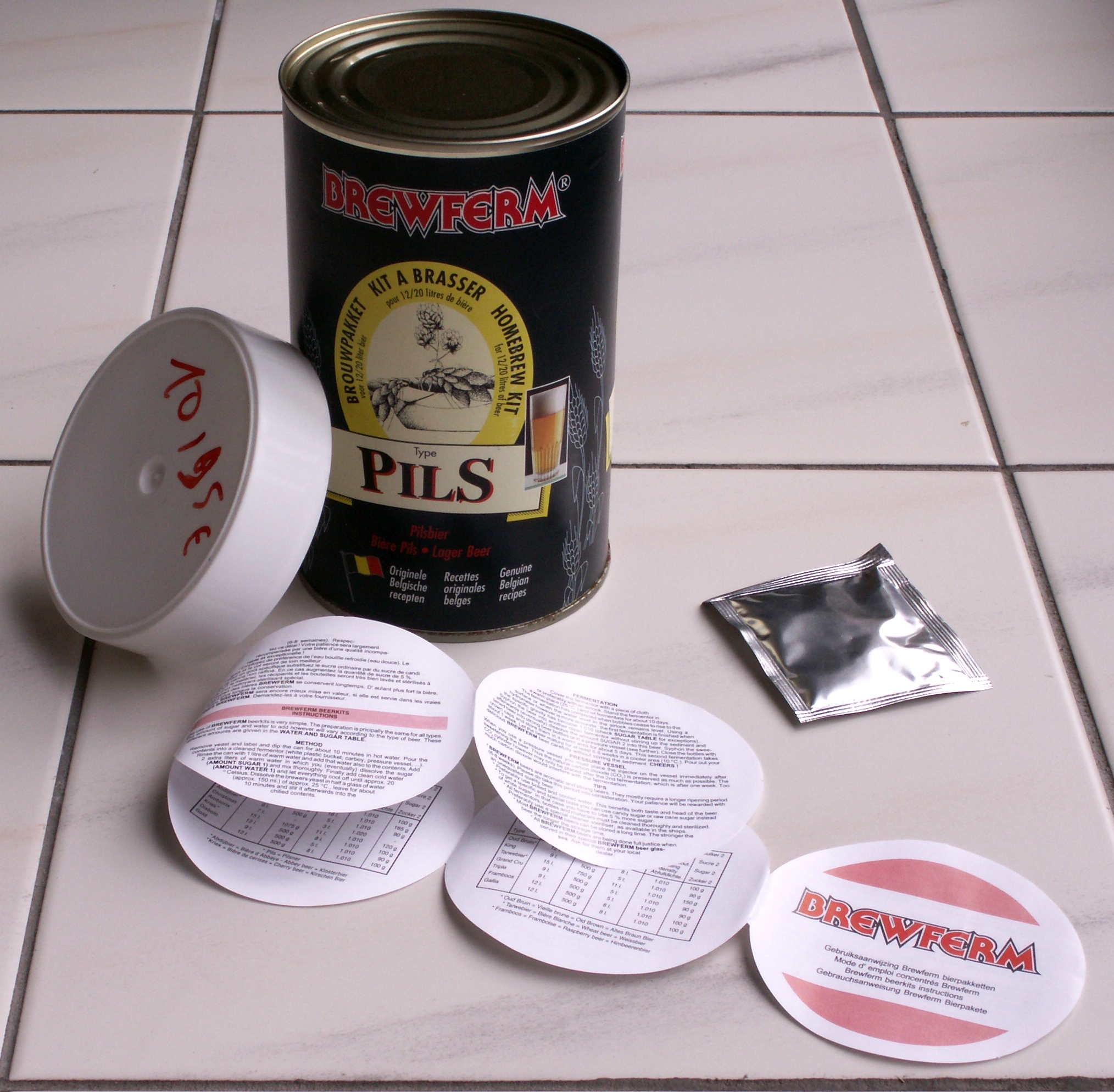
A homebrewing kit consisting of hopped malt extract, yeast and instructions

Homebrewing is the brewing of beer or other alcoholic beverages on a small scale for personal, non-commercial purposes. Supplies, such as kits and fermentation tanks, can be purchased locally at specialty stores or online. Beer was brewed domestically for thousands of years before its commercial production although its legality has varied according to local regulation. Homebrewing is closely related to the hobby of home distillation, the production of alcoholic spirits for personal consumption, but home distillation is generally more tightly regulated.

== History ==
Beer has been brewed domestically throughout its 7,000-year history, beginning in the Neolithic period in Mesopotamia (modern Iraq), Egypt and China. It seems to have first developed as thick beers; during this time meads, fruit wines and rice wines were also developed.

Women brewers dominated alcohol production on every occupied continent until commercialization and industrialization of brewing occurred. The tradition of brewing being in the domain of women stemmed from the fact that brewing was a by-product of gathering, and often considered a part of baking.

The Greeks and Romans cultivated both grape wine and beer, to a lesser extent. Roman women often directed production in larger households while the labor was performed by slaves.

By the Tang dynasty, homebrewing seems to have been a familiar domestic chore in China, albeit the lower classes had to make do with poorly-filtered mash. Laws against making alcohol were enacted and repealed between the Zhou and Ming dynasties.

The 18th century Industrial Revolution brought about such innovations as the thermometer and hydrometer. These tools increased efficiency to the point that mass production of beer was possible for the first time in history. In 1857, French microbiologist Louis Pasteur explained the role of yeast in beer fermentation, allowing brewers to develop strains of yeast with desirable properties such as efficiency converting sugar to alcohol and ability to handle higher alcohol content.

Throughout the first half of the 20th century, homebrewing in the UK was circumscribed by taxation: the Inland Revenue Act 1880 (43 & 44 Vict. c. 20) introduced a 5-shilling homebrewing licence. Chancellor of the Exchequer Reginald Maudling removed the requirement for a brewing licence in 1963. Australia followed suit in 1972 when Gough Whitlam repealed the law prohibiting the brewing of all but the weakest beers in one of his first acts as Prime Minister.

In 1920, Prohibition caused breweries across the United States to be closed down or to begin making malt for other purposes. The homebrewing of beer with an alcohol content higher than 0.5% remained illegal until 1978 when Congress passed a bill repealing federal restrictions and excise taxes, and President Jimmy Carter signed the bill, H.R. 1337, into law, legalizing homebrewing of beer in the United States. Within months of homebrewing's full legalization, Charlie Papazian founded the Brewers Association and American Homebrewers Association. In 1984, Papazian published The Complete Joy of Home Brewing, which remains in print alongside later publications, such as Graham Wheeler's Home Brewing: The CAMRA Guide.

== Brewing culture ==
People choose to brew their own beer for a variety of reasons. Many homebrew to avoid a higher cost of buying commercially equivalent beverages. Brewing domestically also affords one the freedom to adjust recipes according to one's own preference, create beverages that are unavailable on the open market or beverages that may contain fewer calories, or less or more alcohol.

Some people join homebrewing clubs (example the Maltose Falcons) and enter homebrew competitions. The Beer Judge Certification Program (BJCP) is an American organization that oversees homebrew competitions, certifies judges, and offers categories for judging. Similar British organizations are The National Guild of Wine and Beer Judges, and the National Association of Wine and Beermakers (Amateur) - (NAWB), who have held an annual show since 1959.

== Legality ==
Country	Homebrewing	Home distillation
Australia	Legal for individuals to produce beer and wine for personal use.	Illegal to distil alcohol (e.g. spirits) without an excise manufacturer licence. Permission is also required from the Australian Taxation Office to own, possess, dispose of, buy, sell, import or manufacture a still of over 5 litres capacity, whether it is being used to produce alcohol or not.
Austria	Legal for personal use only, not for sale.	Legal to distill alcohol with a permission or license.
Canada	Legal in most Canadian provinces. Liquor laws are regulated provincially, while the federal government has laws about taxation and importation of beer, wine and other liquors.	Legal with a license to distill granted by the (provincial) government.
Czech Republic	Legal. 2000 Litres per household per year of beer for personal use, including notification of the customs office. 2000 litres of wine per household per year.	Not permitted although every household can distill fermented fruit only, up to 30 litres per year in a local distillery, for personal use only.
Denmark	Legal. No limit per household per year of beer, given that it is for personal consumption.	Not permitted - Distillation licenses not available for persons.
Eritrea	Legal.	
Estonia	Legal.	Illegal. Distillation licenses not available for persons.
Ethiopia	Legal.	
Faroe Islands	Illegal.	Illegal.
Finland	Legal for personal use only.	Illegal. Only a commercial manufacturer can apply for a manufacturing permit.
Germany	Legal. 200 litres of beer per household per year may be produced without taxation, but notification of the local customs office is necessary. Larger quantities are taxed according to law. From 2025, the German government wants to allow 500 liters tax-free; the obligation to register is to be abolished.	Illegal. Distillation licenses not available for persons.
Hong Kong	Legal.	Legal with a license, otherwise punishable by fine and/ or forfeiture.
Hungary	Legal. 1000 litres of beer per person per year may be produced without taxation, but notification of the local customs office is necessary. Larger quantities are taxed according to law.	Legal. 50 litres of palinka per person per year may be produced without taxation, but notification of the local customs office is necessary. Larger quantities are taxed according to law.
Iceland	Legal up to 2.25% alcohol by volume only.	Illegal except for officially licensed and regulated distilleries.
India	Legal for personal use in certain states. No national law exists that specifically prevents brewing. Some states ban alcohol completely.	Illegal.
Iran	Illegal	Illegal.
Ireland	Legal for personal use. Illegal with intent to sell or if sold for profit.	Illegal except for officially licensed and regulated distilleries.
Italy	Legal only for personal use.	Illegal
Japan	Legal up to 1% alcohol by volume only; suppliers sell homebrewing equipment and kits, leaving it up to the customer to brew within the law.	Illegal.
Malaysia	Illegal. Exemption is given to natives in Sabah and Sarawak for their own consumption.	Illegal.
New Zealand	Legal for personal use, not for selling without a license.	Legal since 1996 to distill spirits for personal consumption, not for selling without a license.
Netherlands	Legal for personal use only.	Illegal except for officially licensed and regulated distilleries.
Norway	Legal for personal use only.	Illegal. Owning a still or important parts of one illegal.
Poland	Legal for personal use only, not for sale.	Illegal
Portugal	Legal in unlimited quantity for domestic consumption only, not for sale.	
Russian Federation	Legal for personal use only.	Legal for personal use.
Romania	Legal for personal use only.	Legal with payment of excise tax, up to 50 liters per year.
Singapore	Legal up to 30 litres per household per month. Brewers must be 18 years of age or older, and the brewing process must not "degrade the environment". The product must not be sold.	Illegal without a license. License fees are only practical for commercial distilleries.
South Africa	Legal for home brewed beers in unlimited quantities for personal use only, not for sale or barter, without any required permits or licenses. Registration as a "manufacturer not for commercial use" at the South African Revenue Service (SARS) is required to produce wine at home.	Registration and a permit are required to own, operate, or have a still in one's possession. Producing distilled spirits at home is limited "for own use" only and products may not be sold, or used for bartering. As of 2010 "agricultural distilling" permits are no longer available. Commercial operations require a micro-manufacturing license (for quantities up to 2 million litres of spirits per year), and various other permits are required. For larger quantities, a full manufacturing license and various permits are required.
Spain	Legal	
Sudan	Legal	
Sweden	Legal for personal use only, not for sale.	Illegal. Owning a still or important parts of it illegal.
Taiwan	Legal for personal use only, not for sale.	
Turkey	Legal up to 350 litres for personal use.	Illegal
Ukraine	Illegal	Illegal
United Kingdom	Legal in unlimited quantity for domestic consumption only. Fermented products for sale must include payment of alcohol duty and registration with HM Revenue and Customs.	Legal with a license to distill granted by the government.
United States	Legal in all states. Individual states remain free to restrict or prohibit the manufacture of beer, mead, hard cider, wine and other fermented alcoholic beverages at home. Until 2013, Alabama and Mississippi were the only states with laws prohibiting the homebrewing of beer. Alabama and Mississippi both legalized home brewing in their respective 2013 legislative sessions. Some states permit municipalities to prohibit homebrewing. Alaska is one such state. Most states permit homebrewing of 100 US gallons (380 L) of beer per adult (of 21 years or older) per year and up to a maximum of 200 US gallons (760 L) per household annually when there are two or more adults residing in the household. The federal government levies excise taxes on alcohol, and homebrewers are restricted from selling any beer they brew. Until 1978, excise taxes would need to be paid even if the beer was not sold. Likewise, home brewers before 1978 would also have needed to post a "penal bond" (which currently ranges from a minimum of $1000.00 to a maximum of $500,000) which was prohibitively expensive for home brewers.	Illegal federally. Owning unregistered distillation apparatus illegal.

== Homebrewing kits ==
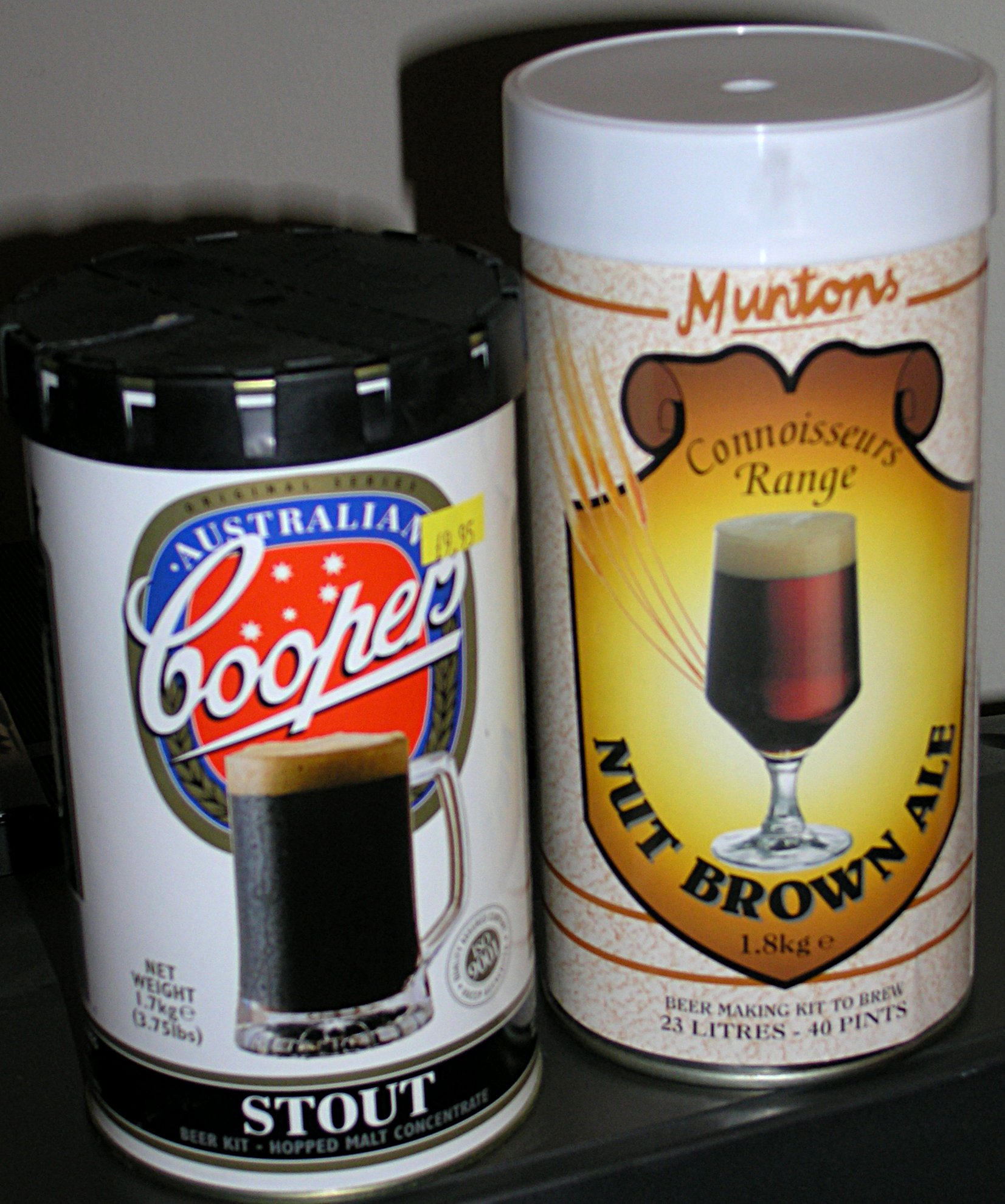
1.7/1.8 kg Homebrewing kits

Homebrewing kits come in many different types and from many different manufacturers. A local homebrew store may create some of their own kits by packaging materials together. Most kits come with a full set of instructions for brewing. These instructions, sometimes called recipes, may vary widely in the amount of instruction given. For instance, many all-grain kits assume a familiarity with the brewing process and so may give fewer specific instructions on the general process. Many advanced brewers prefer to design and perfect their own recipes rather than buy kits. Kits may or may not include yeast.

=== All-grain ===
For brewers with equipment and advanced knowledge about the brewing process, all-grain kits include all the ingredients necessary to create homebrew beer. Most kits include grain and hops, some kits may also include yeast that pairs well with the style of beer. A full set of instructions is generally included. What sets these kits apart from others is the inclusion of malted grain which must first undergo a mash to extract the sugars. This combination of liquid and sugars is known as wort (pronounced "wert") and is necessary for fermentation. A full boil of the wort is then required, with one or more hop additions at different times depending on style. A typical brew session using all-grain takes between 4 and 6 hours, not including fermentation.

=== Malt extract ===
Some kits contain a concentrated malt extract rather than grain. Malt extract can be either dry or in a syrup form, both used to produce fermented syrup. A few advanced kits may also come with a small amount of milled, malted grain that must be steeped with the wort before boiling. A grain bag is usually included to facilitate this process. These additional grains help add different character to the beer so that a single extract can be used to brew several varieties of beer. A full boil is required, with hop additions at different times depending on style. A typical brew session using extract typically takes 2 hours, not including fermentation.

=== Pre-hopped malt extract ===
Sometimes known as beer in a can, no-boil, and hopped wort, these beer kits contain liquid malt extract that has already been boiled with hops to introduce bitterness and flavor. Pre-hopped kits simplify the brewing process by removing the need to add hops at specific times during the boil. Some kits may not require a boil at all, but that may increase the risk of off flavors in the resulting beer from contamination from bacteria and wild yeasts. While some feel the quality of beer from these kits can be on par with commercial beer or homebrew made from other methods, others feel that pre-hopped extract provides hop bitterness with little flavor and bouquet. A typical brew session using pre-hopped ingredients may take less than an hour, not including fermentation.

=== Ingredients outside the kits ===
==== Water ====
Cold water is preferred for the yeast for its high oxygen content.

The water used to homebrew can lead to different tasting results. Historically, beers have been made using different ratios and amounts of minerals within the water based on where the beer is made and where the water is sourced from. For advanced homebrewers, this hardness, as well as the pH level of the water, can be manually created. Using reverse osmosis water as a base, due to its minimal mineral content, a homebrewer can add in the desired amount of different minerals to achieve a water hardness that enhances the taste of the beer.

==== Sucrose ====
Some homebrewing kits usually instruct that a tablespoon of sucrose should be added per bottle.

== Brewing process ==
The principles behind the process of homebrewing beer are similar to commercial brewing. A hopped wort is produced and yeast pitched into the wort to stimulate fermentation. The complexity of the process is mostly determined by the approach used to manufacture the wort; by far the simplest method is kit brewing.

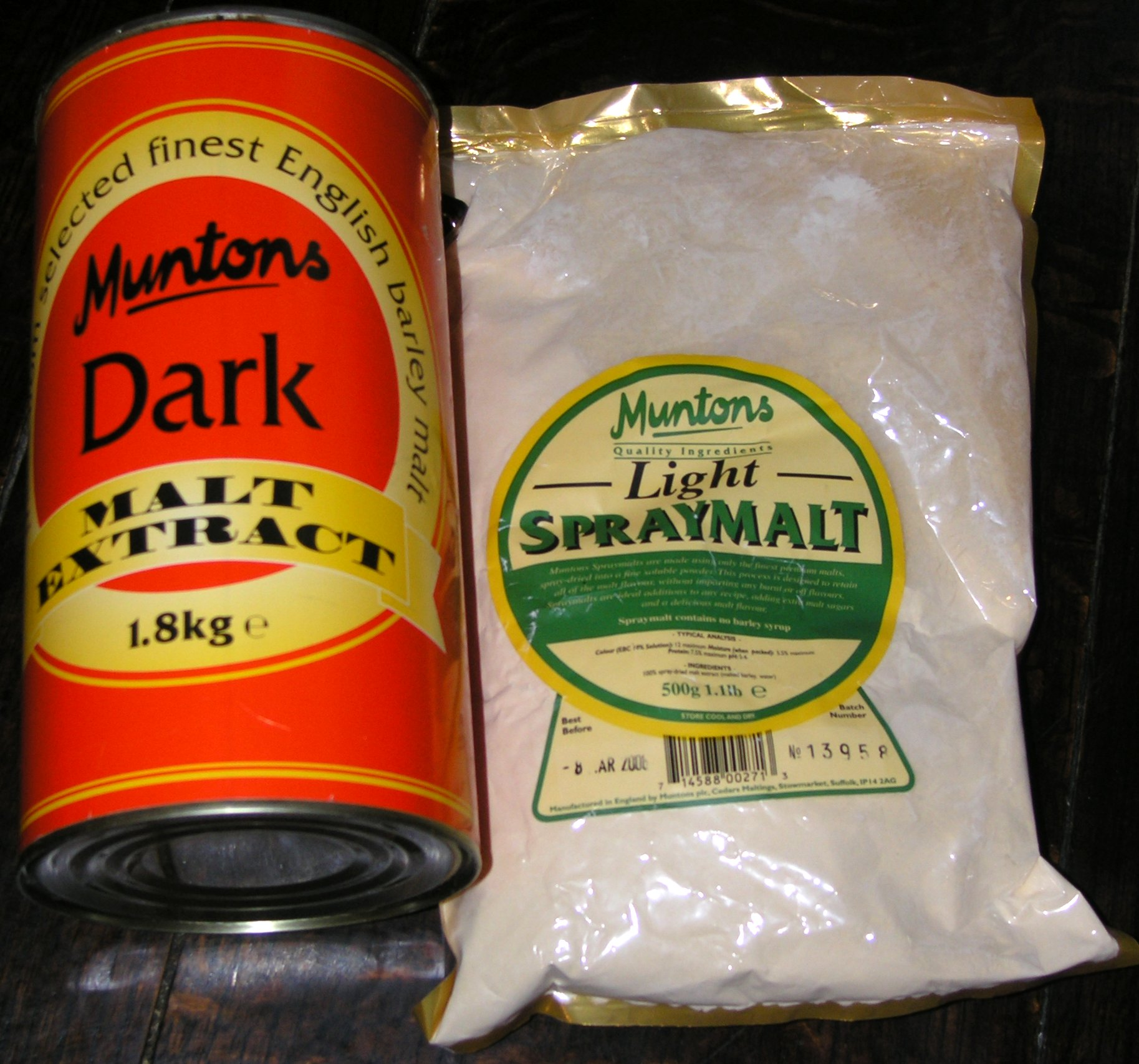
Homebrewing malt extracts: liquid in a can and spray dried

=== Mashing ===
Mashing is the step required to convert starch in the grains into sugar by utilizing natural enzymes. This step varies depending on the skill of the home brewer.

==== Beginners ====
For extract brewing, the mashing has been done by the supplier of the malt extract. No mashing is required for the home brewer in this instance.

==== Intermediate brewers ====
A partial mash differs from an extract brew in that the extract remains enzymatically active. Unlike dead malts where some of the starch has been converted to sugar via the action of heat and the natural enzymes have been destroyed, wheat and unmalted extracts need the help of enzymes to convert their starches into sugars.

The next step up from extract brewing is to use a diastatically active malt extract to convert starches from other beer adjuncts such as flaked and torrified barleys, flaked and torrified wheat, wheat flour, and flaked oats into fermented syrup. These extracts are currently only available in the canned form. Unmalted barleys and wheats can add extra "body" to a finished beer.

==== Advanced brewers ====
Advanced homebrewers forgo the use of concentrated extract and instead convert starch into sugars from the grains themselves in a process often referred to as all grain brewing. Although considered an advanced method, all grain brewing is easily achievable by beginners and with rudimentary equipment, especially when using the Brew-in-a-Bag (BIAB) method.

In all grain brewing the wort is made by making a mash from crushed malted barley (or alternative grain adjuncts such as unmalted barley, wheat, oats, corn or rye) and hot water. This requires a vessel known as a mash tun, which is often insulated, or can be done in a single brewing vessel if the homebrewer is using the BIAB method.

In one procedure popular with homebrewers called the "Infusion Mash", milled grains are combined in the tun and hot water is added. Before being combined with the grains, the water is heated to a temperature that is hotter than the desired temperature for enzymatic activity. The reason the water is heated is to compensate for the fact that the grain are cooler than the desired temperature.

The grains are infused with yet hotter water to rinse more sugars from the mash in a process known as sparging. There are two types of sparging. Fly sparging and batch sparging. Fly sparging involves rinsing the grain bed by adding small amounts of hot water to the top while draining equal amounts from the bottom. Batch sparging involves adding all or most of your sparge water at one time to the grain bed and slowly draining it from the bottom. The sparging process will also stop any further enzymatic activity if much hotter water is used; conversely the mash may be heated to around 80 °C (176 °F) to end such activity prior to placing it in the lauter-tun, and to prevent cooler grain from lowering the sparge water temperature to a lower than desirable figure.

==== Boiling the wort ====
Whether the homebrewer chooses to mash their own grains or chooses to purchase malt extracts, the homebrewer will then need to boil the liquid and add hops. The length of time the wort boils with the hops varies depending on the style of beer, but is usually 60–90 minutes.

Hops are added at different times during the boil, depending on the desired result. Hops added at the beginning of the boil contribute bitterness, hops added in the last thirty minutes contribute flavor. Hops added in the last few minutes or even after the end of the boil contribute both flavor and hop aroma. These hop additions are generally referred to as bittering, flavor, and aroma additions respectively.

Finings such as Irish moss, a form of seaweed, gelatin, and others can be added in the final 15–30 minutes of the boil to help prevent haze in the resulting beer.

==== Cooling the wort ====
The primary reason to cool the wort is to get the wort to the proper temperature for healthy yeast propagation. Other benefits of rapidly cooling of the wort include "locking in" hop flavor and aroma, aiding in the production of "cold break" where haze-producing proteins coagulate ultimately resulting in a clearer beer, slowing the production of dimethyl sulfide (DMS), and hindering the growth of wort contamination by pitching yeast as soon as possible.

Many homebrewers use an inexpensive wort chiller called an "immersion chiller." These resemble the "worms" used in distilleries consisting of a coiled length of copper or stainless steel tubing (typically 50 feet in length) with an inlet and outlet connection. The inlet is attached to a source of cool water such as a sink faucet. The immersion chiller is inserted into the hot wort then cool water pumped is through the coil where a heat exchange occurs thus lowering the temperature of the wort.

Many homebrewers also use a "counterflow chiller." This device consists of a tube of copper or stainless steel tubing nested inside a larger diameter length of tube. It resembles an immersion chiller but works more like plate chiller in that hot wort is circulated through the inner tube and cool water is passed through the outer tube counter to the direction of the hot wort, thereby cooling the wort quickly.

Some homebrewers use the 'no-chill' approach. It is a water-conserving technique, depending on the ambient temperature being lower to cool the hot wort. After the boil the hot wort is racked into a fitting fermenter. After placing the cap or the lid, the fermenter is tumbled slightly to let the hot wort sanitise all internal surfaces. It then will be left alone (often overnight) until it has reached pitching temperatures, what may take up to the best part of a day. Contamination should not be an issue since near-boiling wort is a very effective sanitiser. Where the desired outcome is to capture wild yeast from the air, some homebrewers leave the wort to cool in a broad, uncovered container, typically called a coolship.

==== Fermentation ====
Once the wort has cooled to a temperature that is friendly to yeast, the yeast is "pitched" into the wort and allowed to ferment. It is at this point that 'wort" becomes "beer." Primary fermentation in homebrewing takes place in large glass or plastic carboys or food-grade plastic buckets, nearly always sealed. When sealed, the fermenter is stoppered with a fermentation lock, which allows the carbon dioxide gas produced to vent, while preventing other gasses and particles from entering. Recent innovations in nanotechnology have enabled a fermentation lock called the Sterilock to also prevent bacteria, wild yeasts and other potential harmful fungi reaching the fermenter although in some beer styles known as Sour Beer, bacteria or wild yeasts are desirable to obtain the sour characteristics. During this time, temperatures should be kept at optimum temperature for the particular yeast strain being used. For ale this temperature is usually 18–24 °C (64–75 °F); for lager it is usually much colder, around 10 °C (50 °F). A vigorous fermentation then takes place, usually starting within twelve hours and continuing over the next few days. During this stage, the fermentable sugars (maltose, glucose, and sucrose) are consumed by the yeast, while ethanol and carbon dioxide are produced as byproducts by the yeast. A layer of sediment, the lees or "trub", appears at the bottom of the fermenter, composed of heavy fats, proteins and inactive yeast. This yeast is sometimes reused in subsequent batches. Often, the brew is moved to a second fermenting vessel after primary fermentation called a secondary fermenter. This secondary fermentation process is often utilized by more advanced home brewers to enhance flavor. While not required, it is generally practiced by home brewers who wish to age or clarify their beer by removing it from the sediment left behind by primary fermentation, often through the addition of isinglass, colloidal silicon dioxide, or spakolloid. In addition to using two different fermenting containers, some home brewers may choose to only use one container in which primary and secondary fermentation take place. This container is usually referred to as a uni-tank. Uni-tanks are usually conical in shape, and can be made from plastic, glass, or stainless steel. A popular plastic conical for homebrewing is FastFerment, while a popular stainless steel conical fermenter for homebrewers is The Blichmann Fermenator.

==== Carbonation ====
Upon conclusion of fermentation, the beer is carbonated before it is consumed. This is typically done in one of two ways; force carbonation in a keg using compressed carbon dioxide, or bottle carbonation with priming sugar. Any bottle that is able to withstand the pressure of carbonation can be used, such as used beer bottles, flip-top bottles with rubber stoppers such as Grolsch, or even plastic bottles such as soda bottles, provided they are properly sanitised. Priming briefly reactivates the yeast that remains in the bottle, carbonating the brew. Homebrewed beers and lagers are typically unfiltered (filtering improves visual appearance of the product, but complicates carbonation). Bottled beer becomes clear quicker than kegged beer, since the yeast does not have as far to descend.

Anderson Valley Brewing Company. Sarah Stierch

Anderson Valley Brewing Company. Sarah Stierch

A video of the homebrewing bottling process: after primary fermentation, the brewers add additional sugar for producing carbonation, transfer the beer to clean bottles, and seal the bottles with crown caps. (3 minutes 8 seconds)

In homebrewing, adding priming sugar, malt extract, or carbonation tablets at bottling time to beer that has had its fermentable sugar content totally consumed is the safest approach to carbonation. Exceeding recommended levels of priming sugar for a given recipe can result in exploding bottles (aka "bottle bombs"), as is using inappropriate bottles or improper capping methods. Beer may also be force-carbonated using a keg and special bottling equipment so that the carbonation level can be carefully controlled. Carbonation is often achieved with approximately 4 ounces (110 g) of corn sugar boiled in 2 cups (~480 mL) of water then cooled and added to a typical 5-US-gallon (19 L) batch before bottling.

== Kegs ==
Homebrewers often use kegs for aging, filtering, and storing beer. These are seldom the standard kegs used by major brewers to transport draught beer to wholesalers, but instead are reconditioned Cornelius kegs (colloquially known as "corny kegs" or "cornies") that were originally manufactured to store soda; these vessels are much easier to fill, clean and maintain than standard beer kegs.

These kegs are stainless steel cylinders that hold approximately 5 US gallons (19 L) of liquid. The keg is filled with liquid via a removable hatch on the top, which is then closed and sealed. Carbon dioxide is added to pressurize the keg via an inlet port on the top and is facilitated by gently rocking the brew back and forth. Liquid is dispensed via an outlet port attached to a tube that extends to the bottom of the keg. Pin-lock and ball-lock fittings (or posts) are the two types of couplings used on the inlet and outlet ports. Coke distributors used pin-lock fittings, while Pepsi distributors used ball-lock fittings. Ball-lock are most frequently encountered. The pin-lock style is sometimes referred to as a "Coke" keg or style and the ball-lock is sometimes referred to as a "Pepsi" keg or style though the fittings themselves are removable, serviceable, and contain interchangeable parts.

Homebrewers sometimes use 15.5-US-gallon (59 L) commercial kegs (known as 1/2 kegs) for boiling vessels in creating wort. The kegs are drilled for a drain at the bottom, and the top cut open to create a large stainless steel cooking kettle. Many times, the piece of metal cut out of the top is re-used to create a false bottom for straining wort during the mashing process, as well as to strain the boiled wort when adding hops without using a mesh grain bag.

Alternatively, kegs specifically designed for home brewing are available. The capacity may be matched to commercial extract brewing kits; typically 12 and 23 litres. Smaller 2.5-US-gallon (9.5 L) kegs are also made for ease of transporting to a function.

Kegs may have residual pressure, and this must be vented to avoid having the valve explode and injure or kill a person as the valve shoots out. Conventional 15.5-US-gallon (59 L) kegs have circle spring clips that can be removed to release the tap valve. Some kegs such as those used by Miller have threaded valves that are threaded into the keg, and after venting, can be opened by turning the valve counterclockwise using a piece of 1 3/4-inch-wide (44 mm) metal inserted between the valve ears and turned with an adjustable wrench, or pipe wrench. A "wonderbar" type of pry bar just happens to fit. After the valve is loose it is still retained by a safety catch that must be pried inward. A simple valve seal depressing tool and a screwdriver with a 1/8 inch (3.2 mm) diameter shaft must be used to release the safety catch. See "How to remove a Miller threaded keg valve (not retained by a spiral ring)". The safety catch prevents the valve from releasing under pressure.

It is not recommended that kegs be sanitised with bleach. To avoid unpleasant residuals, kegs are sanitised with an iodine- or oxygen-based sanitiser. Sanitisers like Star-San and B-Brite are commonly used. The ball lock valves may be unscrewed using wrenches to allow further cleaning or replacement of O-rings or poppet valves.

== Environmental impact ==
Homebrewing can reduce the environmental impact of fermented beverages by using less packaging and transportation than commercially brewed beverages, and by the use of refillable jugs, reusable bottles or other reusable containers.

== Brewing software and technology ==
Brewers now have access to a variety of software tools, whether free/open source or commercial, which allow them to formulate and adjust recipes. There are also web based recipe creation and sharing sites with extensive recipe databases contributed by users that can be viewed or downloaded for printing or importation into software using BeerXML. More traditional Internet forums continue to provide brewers with sources of advice and information from their peers all over the world.

== Homebrewing competitions ==
Homebrewers can submit their beer for evaluation into competitions. These competitions provide blind feed back to brewers so they can get objective feedback, make adjustments to improve their brewing, and be recognized for outstanding homebrew. Competitions can be organized by homebrew clubs, state fairs, or businesses. The AHA, BJCP, and HomebrewCompetitions.com all keep a list of currently scheduled competitions. Homebrewcompetitions.com is a free resource for homebrewers and homebrew competition organizers.

The Beer Judge Certification Program (BJCP) trains and certifies beer judges through classes and tasting and written tests. BJCP judges evaluate the beer on 5 criteria: Aroma, Appearance, Flavor, Mouthfeel, and Overall Impression. The beer is also compared to a style provided by the brewer and described in the BJCP Style Guidelines.

The Polish Homebrewer's Association (PSPD) has developed their own guidelines for beer competition judging and trains judges for competitions in Poland. A list of competitions is available on their website.

== See also ==
- Brewing
- Christina Perozzi and Hallie Beaune
- F. H. Steinbart, Portland, Oregon
- Pruno, homebrewed alcohol in prisons
- Winemaking
- Alcohol distillation
