= F. H. Steinbart =

Homebrew supply store in Portland, Oregon, US

F.H. Steinbart Co.
- Industry: Homebrew Supply Store
- Predecessor: F.H. Steinbart & Son Co.
- Founded: 1918
- Founder: Franz Steinbart
- Headquarters: Portland, United States
- Owners: James Ameeti
- Website: https://fhsteinbart.com/

F.H. Steinbart is a homebrew supply store on SE 12th Avenue in Portland, Oregon. It is the oldest homebrew supply store in the United States and helped nurture the vibrant Pacific Northwest craft-brewing scene.

== Franz Steinbart ==
It was founded in 1918 by Franz Steinbart, who was born in West Prussia in 1854. Steinbart immigrated to New York at 25, then moved to Iowa, worked on a farm, and learned English. In 1889, he married Henrietta in Cleveland and they had 5 children (Elsa, Adelaid, Erna, Claus, and Kurt). They moved to Milwaukee, Wi, where Steinbart managed the affluent Deutsche Club. He later worked for the Koss Company, which manufactured brewing equipment, and he traveled through the Western United States selling equipment to brewers. In 1912, the family moved to Barons, Alberta, Canada, where Steinbart managed a hotel. Three years later, they moved to Portland; Franz founded FH Steinbart & Son Co. in 1918.

Originally located on 88 First Street in Portland, the store sold new and used brewing equipment like filters for soda and fruit juice, bottle fillers, crown caps, and labelers. They also sold ingredients like barley malt extract and ground barley, hops, and gelatin. When Steinbart died in 1934, the store was located at 527 SE Grand Street.

The shop opened the year national Prohibition was passed, and two years after Prohibition was enacted in Oregon. F.H. Steinbart sold equipment and ingredients to the large commercial breweries that continued to produce “near beer” and soda; they also sold supplies to wineries produced sacramental wines for religious ceremonies. However, people still made beer and moonshine during Prohibition out of raisins, rice, or potatoes; there were also 12 malt stores in Portland in that era. The store also advertised complete brewing systems, like the 300 barrel brewhouse advertised in the 1918 Western Brewer.

== Joseph and John DeBenedetti ==
Steinbart hired Joseph DeBenedetti in 1924 or 1926, and he repaired and installed brewing equipment for the store. When Steinbart died in 1934, Joseph and another employee, his cousin Angelo Curletto, bought the business from the Steinbart family; Joseph became the sole owner when Angelo died in 1957.

In 1959, the store had moved next door and was located at 526 SE Grand Street. By the 1950s and 1960s, F.H. Steinbart also carried hop flavored corn sugar and equipment like beer testers, crocks, wooden spigots, imported beer steins, and a 6 keg beer cabinet. As demand for equipment for home use grew, the store began to sell items like a hydrometer, siphons, and primary or secondary fermenters.

They also advertised the sale of home wine making supplies, which Joseph DeBenedetti said was part of a shift in 1959 or 1960 away from beer making and towards wine making. To meet customer demand, the store sold grape crushers, oak barrels, cider mills, imported wine concentrate, and wine making reference books. By the 1970s, they supported wine making competitions such as "Wine Fest 72" held in Milwaukie, Oregon. They continue to sell wine making equipment and supplies, including wine bases and fruit purees.

John DeBenedetti went to work for his father in 1975 and took over ownership when Joseph died. When he wasn't at the store, John enjoyed sailing. He died in April 2021 and his wife Mary Kay took over as sole owner.

== James Ameeti and Perfect Pour Services ==
In August 2024, F.H. Steinbart was saved from closure by James Ameeti, who had founded Perfect Pour Services in 2008 and has been a customer of F.H. Steinbart since he founded his Portland-based draft services company.

== Homebrewing in Oregon ==
In the 1970s, flavor often was not the first concern. “It was guys, mostly, who wanted to make beer cheaply,” recalls DeBenedetti. President Jimmy Carter signed HR 1337 into law in 1978, which legalized homebrewing at the federal level; before then, homebrewers had to pay excise taxes in accordance with an outdated law that originated during Prohibition. Author and educator Fred Eckhardt purchased supplies and sold his books at the store; he was also a member of the Oregon Brew Crew. Eckhardt also publicized his classes or events, such as the 1985 symposium on beer and brewing.

The interest in homebrewing resulted in the first microbrewery in Oregon after repeal, the Cartwright Brewing Company, which opened in Portland in 1980. In the years that followed, many commercial brewers in Oregon began as homebrewer customers who were introduced to the company by buying supplies there – the Widmers and McMenamins brothers were well-known store regulars.

The small community of brewers shared information (recipes, tips for fixing equipment, classes) and F.H. Steinbart provided both a space for this community to gather and was a supplier of ingredients or equipment. John DeBenedetti helped establish the Oregon Brew Crew in 1980; it is Oregon's largest active homebrew club. The club meets monthly in the F.H. Steinbart warehouse. The store hosts events sponsored by the American Homebrewers Association, including the annual "Big Brew" event for local homebrewers and the nationwide "Learn to Brew Day" event.

The draught department has installed beer-dispensing systems at some of the largest facilities in the Pacific Northwest. It was first advertised in 1980, with services of commercial installations for hotels, restaurant, and taverns. Steinbart worked with celebrated breweries in the past, including Henry Weinhard's, Blitz, Lucky Lager, Olympia, and Rainier, and in more recent times with breweries and regional venues that include Deschutes, Widmer Brothers, Buoy Brewing, Hopworks, the Rose Garden, Green Zebra stores, and Autzen Stadium at the University of Oregon.

In addition to brewing ingredients, the store carries preparation and packaging equipment and special ingredients for artisanal food products and beverages such as kombucha, kefir, pickles, wine, mead, and cheese.
