= Maltose Falcons Homebrewing Society =

Oldest homebrewing club in America

- Formation: 1974; 52 years ago
- Founder: Merlin Elhardt, John Daume
- Type: Nonprofit
- Legal status: 501(c)(7) organization
- Purpose: Learning to make the best beer possible
- Headquarters: Woodland Hills, California
- Members: 150 (2025)
- President: Jenna Bonney
- Website: maltosefalcons.com

The Maltose Falcons Homebrewing Society (aka "The Falcons") is a non-profit organization founded in 1974 in Woodland Hills, Los Angeles, California. Recognized as the oldest active homebrew club in the United States, it played a pivotal role in the legalization of homebrewing, established a model of educational and promotional activities for later clubs and promoted the rise of the American Craft Brewing industry.

The Falcons were involved in lobbying for state and federal legislation that legalized homebrewing, including H.R. 1337 signed by President Carter in 1978.

The club has been recognized nationally, winning the Anchor Brewing “Homebrew Club of the Year” award multiple times and receiving the American Homebrewers Association Radegast Award in 2015.

== Legal Efforts ==
The Falcons worked to legalize homebrewing at the state and federal level alongside other early clubs, including the Draught Board, Underground Brewers of Connecticut and the San Andreas Malts, as well as homebrewers like Lee Coe and suppliers like Pat Baker and Nancy Crosby Efforts succeeded with California's "Bates Bill" and President Jimmy Carter's signing of H.R. 1337 in 1978. Legalization allowed the open discussion of small scale brewing, leading to growth of the hobby and the nascent craft beer industry.

In 2016, the club worked with the California Homebrewers Association to change state rules to allow homebrew in licensed establishments (bars, breweries, restaurants, festivals). These changes legalized homebrew club meetings at local breweries and clubs pouring at non-profit beer festivals

== Club Activities ==
The club runs multiple activities through the course of the year to promote homebrewing and craft beer. This includes monthly educational meetings, virtual happy hours and brewing sessions, as well as annual festivals and competitions. Meetings are open to the public with other events requiring membership.

=== The Mayfaire Competition ===
Since 1979, the club has held an annual public competition that is the nation's oldest continually running homebrew competition. A number of winners have worked extensively in the hobby or moved into the professional brewing world.

The Mayfaire serves as one of three competitions that awards points for medals towards the Sierra Nevada California Homebrewer of the Year Award

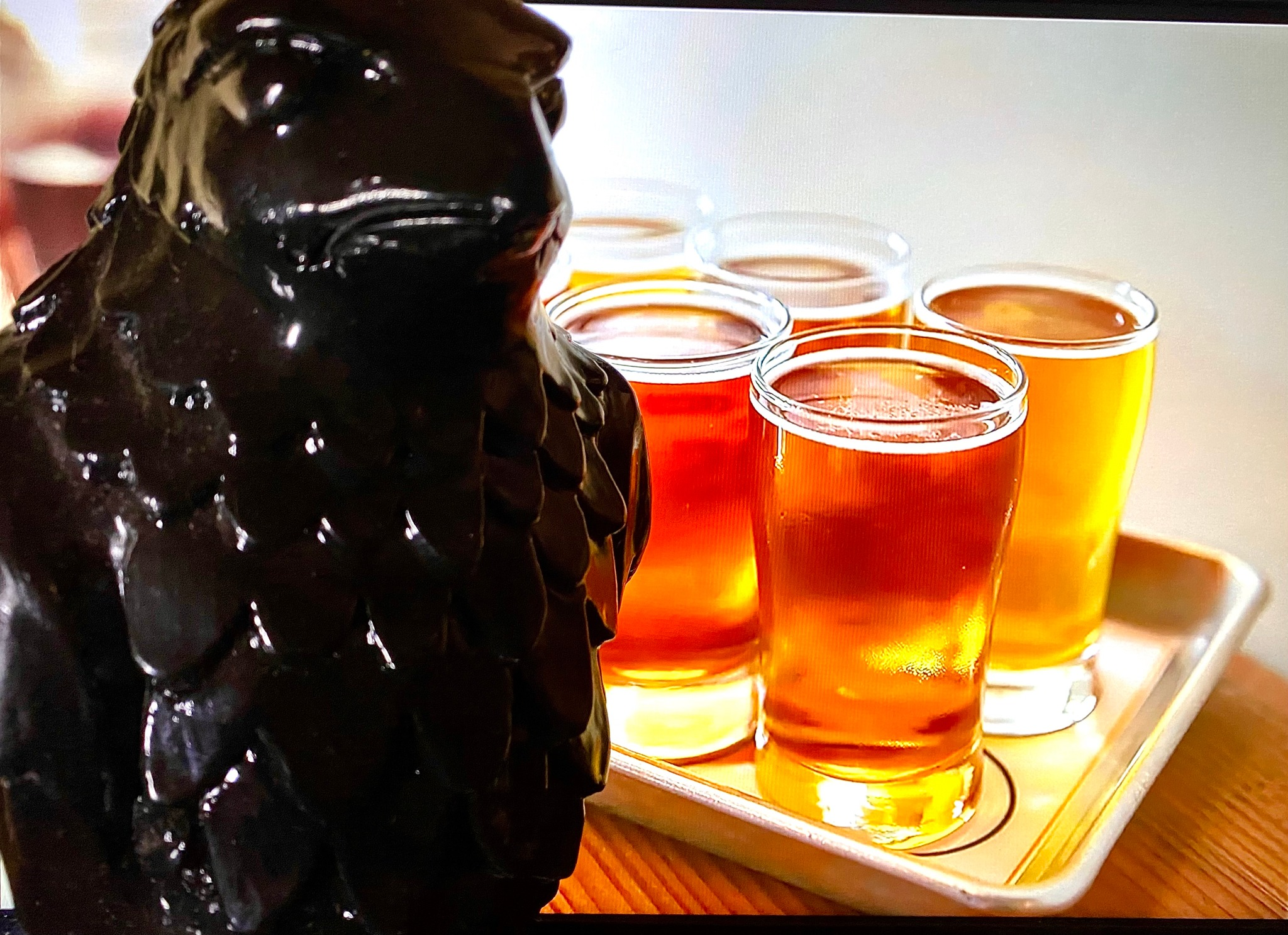
"The Bird" Trophy - Awarded since 1990

==== Notable Past winners ====
- John Maier - founding brewmaster of Rogue Ales (1985, 1986, 1987)
- Jamil Zainasheff - Ninkasi Award winner, beer author and podcast host, founder of Heretic Brewing. (2002, 2003, 2007)
- Mike McDole - Sam Adams Long Shot winner, podcaster and beer educator (2005, 2006)
- Mike Mraz - California Homebrewer of the Year, founder of Mraz Brewing (2008, 2012)
- Nick Corona - California Homebrewer of the Year, founder of Five Suits Brewing (2015, 2017)

== Awards and Accolades ==
- 1988 - John Maier - National Homebrewer of the Year from the AHA.
- 1989 - Anchor Brewing's California Homebrew Club of the Year. The club would win this award again in 1994, 1996, 1999, 2004, 2007, 2011 and 2014
- 2015 - AHA's Radegast Homebrew Club of the Year Award
- 2023 - Drew Beechum awarded the AHA Governing Committee Recognition Award

== Notable Members ==
- Drew Beechum - author, podcaster, founding board member of the AHA
- Chuck Bennett - designer of Sierra Nevada Brewing's early labels
- Michael Bowe - founder of Angel City Brewery
- Paul Camusi - co-founder of Sierra Nevada Brewing
- John Daume - co-founder of the club, owner of the Home Beer Wine Cheese Making Shop
- Merlin Elhardt - co-founder of the club, founded the organization to make better German style beers.
- John Maier - retired brewmaster at Rogue Ales
- Marty Velas - founder of Fanatic Brewing
- Skip Virgilio - co-founder of AleSmith Brewing
