= Fermentation crock =

Cookware used to assist with fermenting food

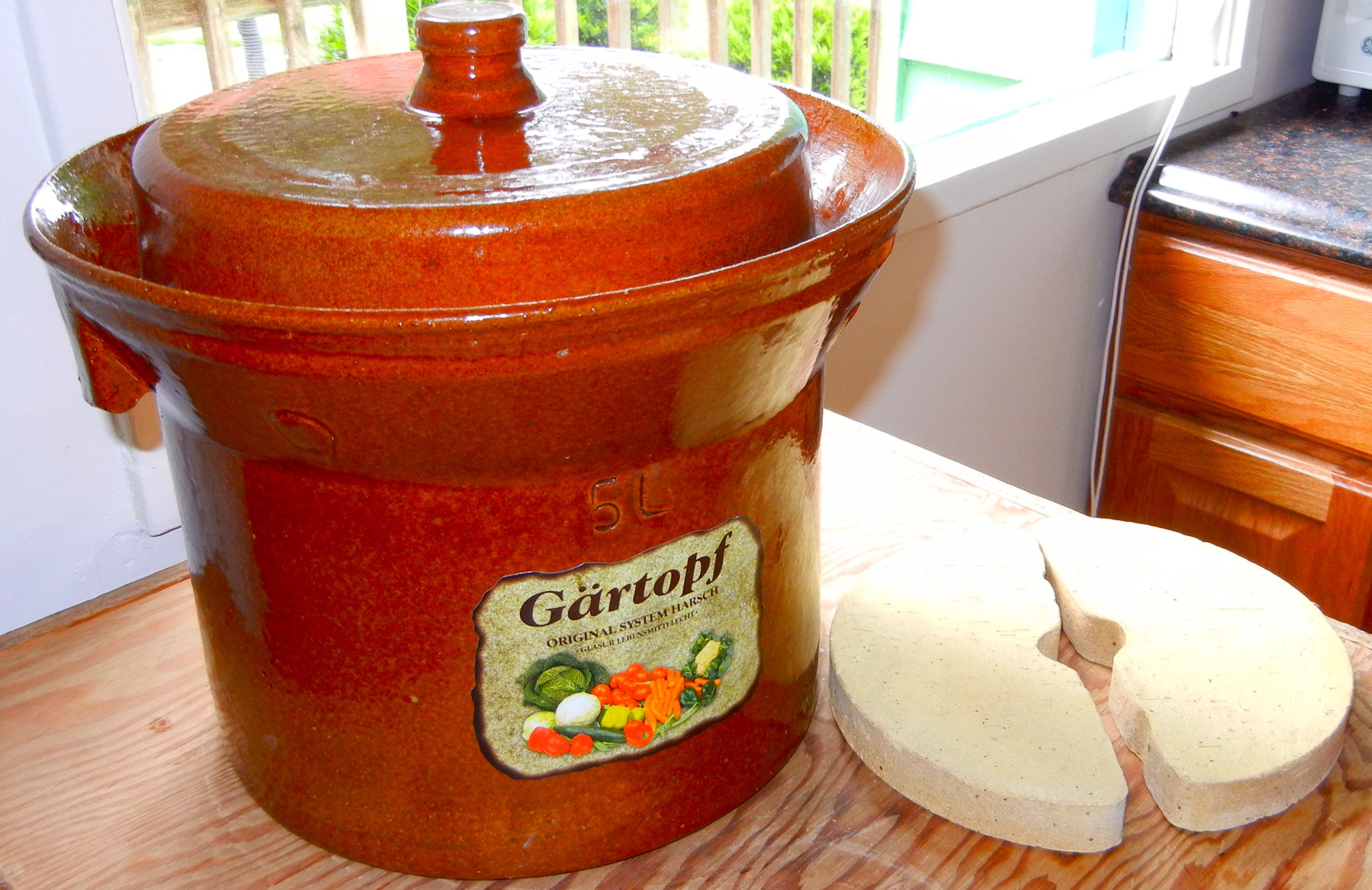
A fermentation crock, with ceramic weights

A fermentation crock, also known as a gärtopf crock or Harsch crock, is a crock for fermentation. There are two main varieties of crock, an open type and a water sealed type. Open type crocks can use a lid or plate to submerge the fermenting produce.

Water sealed crocks have a gutter in the rim which is then filled with water so that when the top is put on an airlock is created, which prevents the food within from spoiling due to the development of surface molds. Ceramic weights may also be used to keep the fermenting food inside submerged. A fermentation tamper, a wide stick or dowel usually made of wood, may be used to pack food into the crock to keep it below the surface of the brine.

Stoneware fermentation crocks can become unsafe for food, especially if they use lead glazes. Modern fermentation crocks can be made of plastic or glass.

== See also ==
- Sauerkraut
