= Peremech =

Tatar and Bashkir fried dough pastry

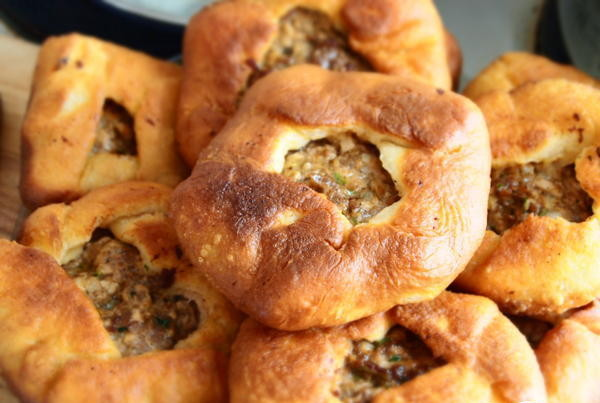
- Alternative names: Belyash
- Place of origin: Russia
- Region or state: Tatarstan, Bashkortostan
- Main ingredients: Unleavened dough or yeast dough, ground meat

Peremech (Tatar: пәрәмәч / pərəməç / pärämäç; Bashkir: бәрәмес, tr. beremes; Russian: беляш, romanized: belyash) is an individual-sized fried dough pastry common in Volga Tatar and Bashkir cuisines. It is made from unleavened or leavened dough and usually filled with ground meat and chopped onion. Originally, finely chopped pre-cooked meat was used as a filling, but later raw ground meat became more common. Alternatively, peremech can be filled with potato or quark.

Peremech is usually shaped into a flattened sphere with a circular "window" in the middle. In contrast to doughnuts, the hole does not go all the way through, but is only made at the top, such that the filling is visible in the middle. The shape is thus somewhat similar to Russian vatrushka. However, dough neatly kneaded around the hole gives the classical peremech its distinctive shape.

Peremech is traditionally served with broth, qatiq (yogurt) or ayran.

Nowadays, the meat-filled version is common throughout Russia and other post-Soviet countries, where it is usually referred to as belyash (Russian: беляш, pl. беляши, belyashi). This word appeared in Russian in the second half of the 20th century and possibly derives from another Tatar word, bəleş, which denotes a baked full-sized pie with meat and potato filling. Modern variants of belyashi can also be made without a hole in the top. Along with pirozhki and chiburekki, belyashi are a common street food in the region.

In Finland, the pastry is known as pärämätsi and first appeared in the 1960s in Tampere.

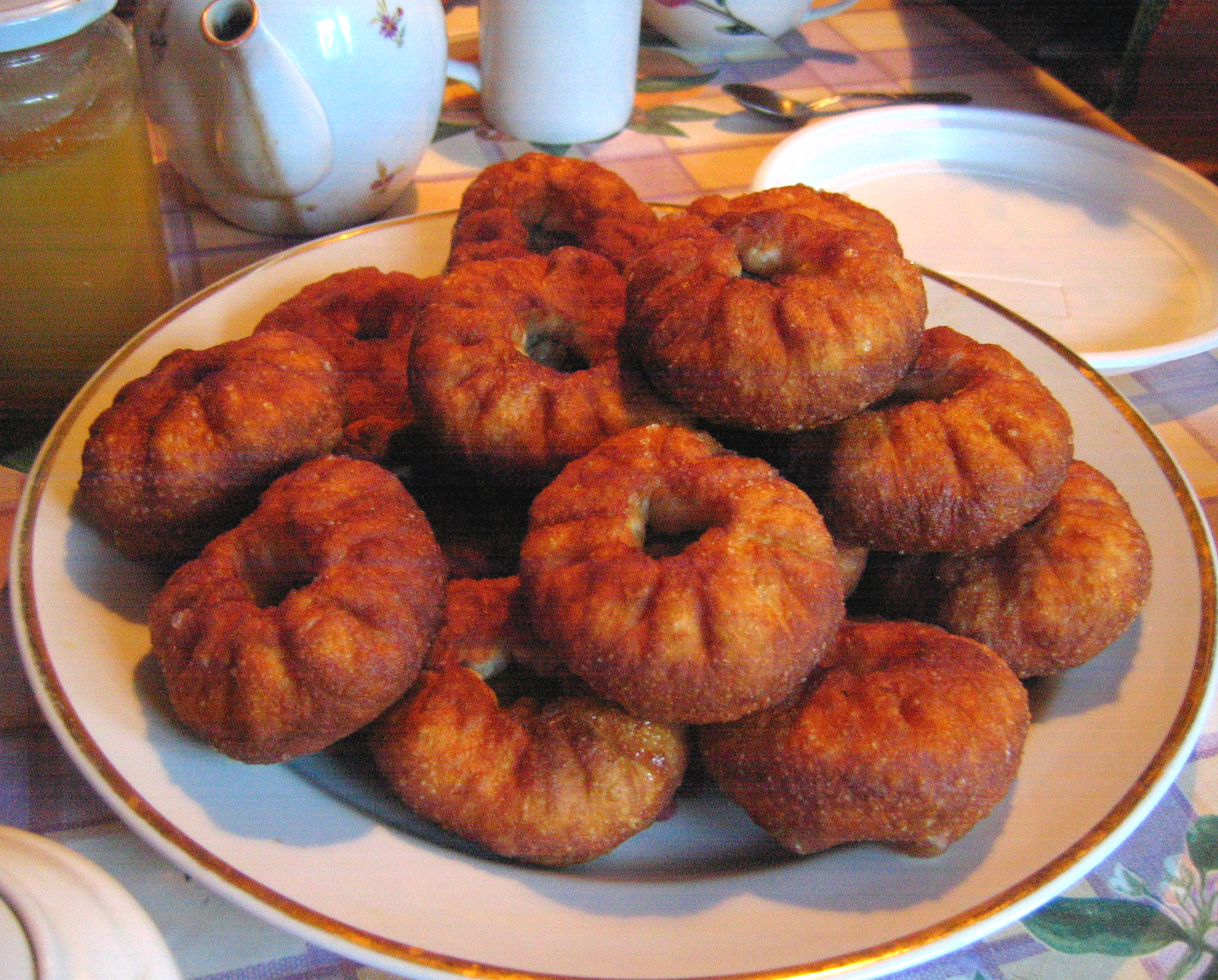
Traditionally shaped peremech with neatly pleated dough casing

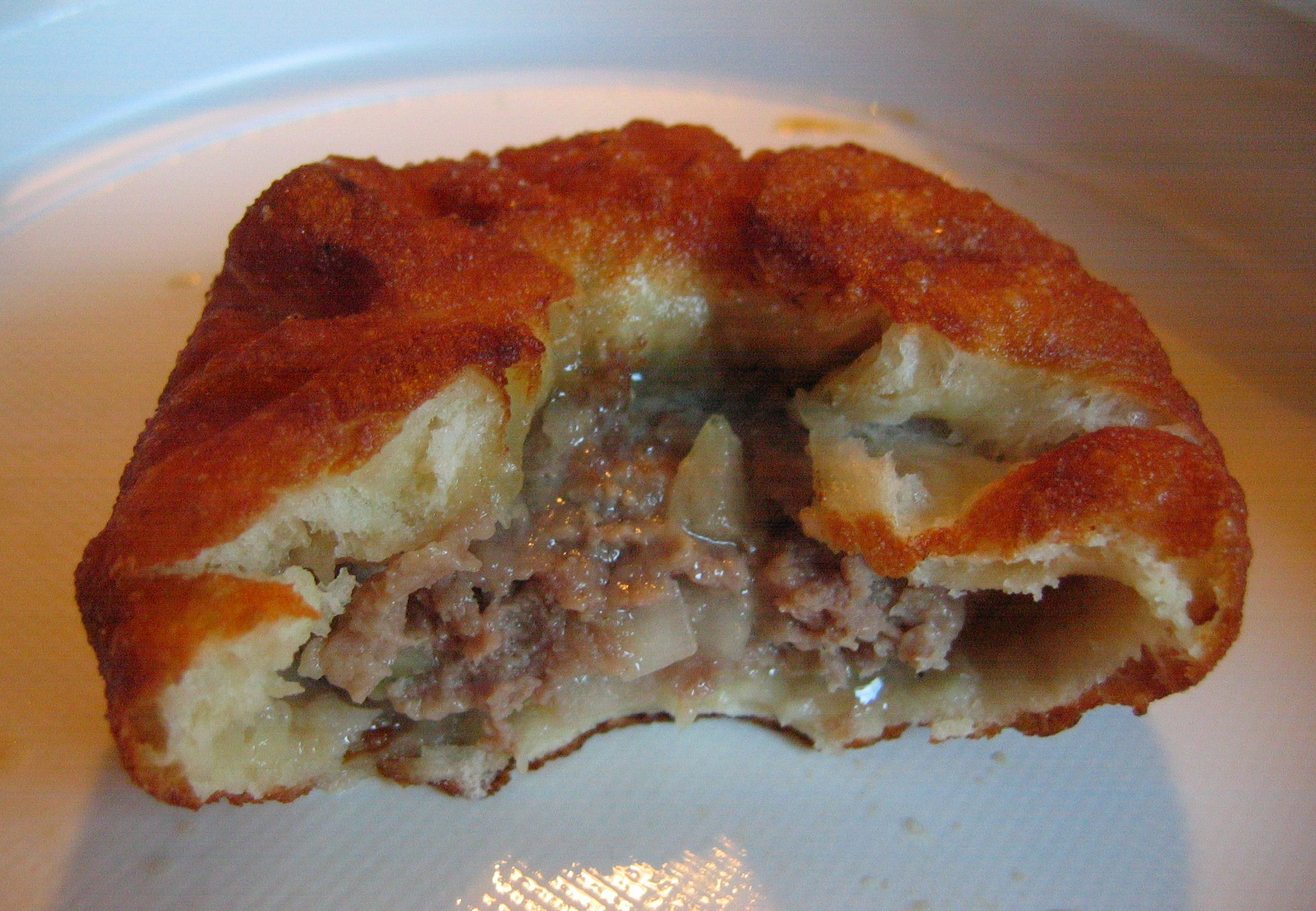
A bitten belyash with meat filling

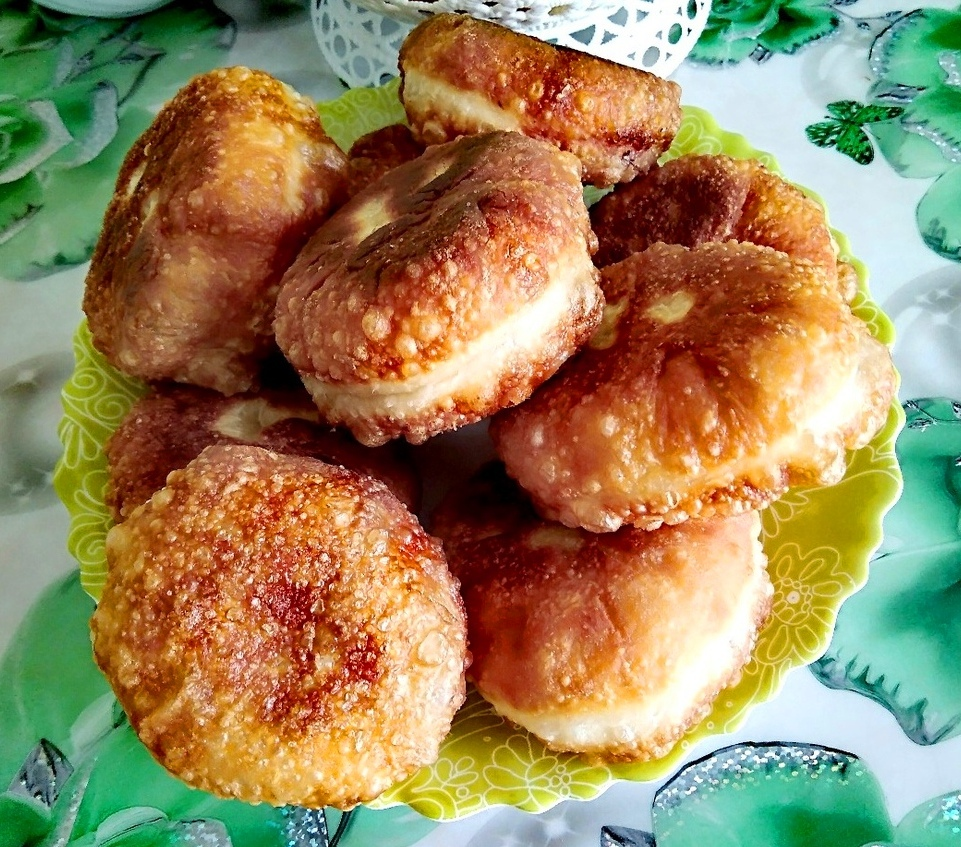
Belyashs without a hole in the top

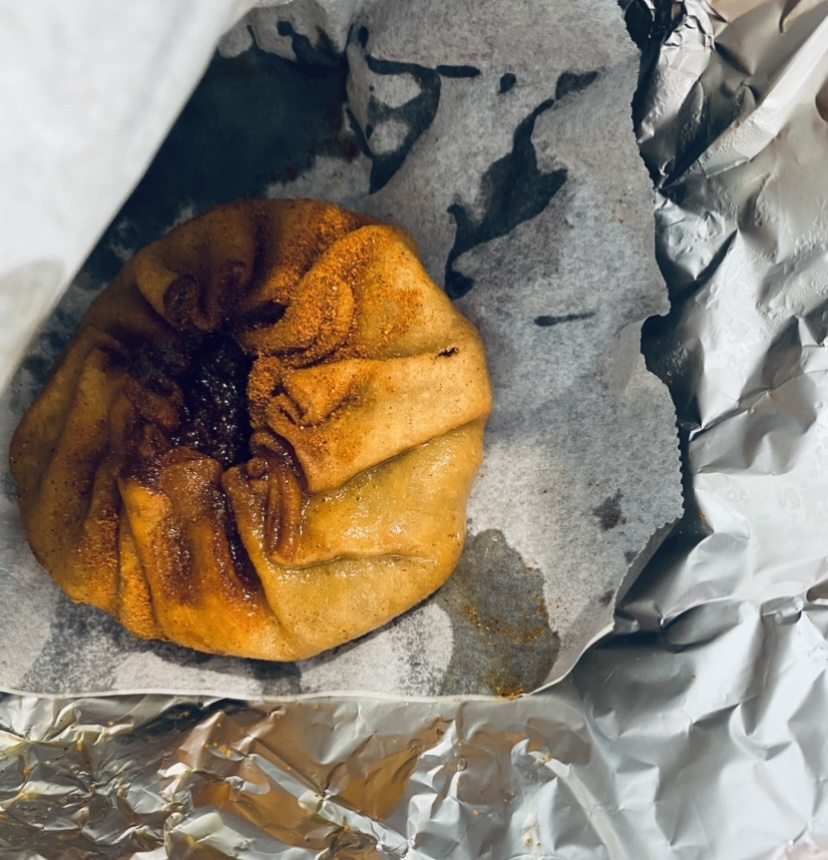
Pärämätsi in Tampere, Finland

== See also ==
- List of Russian dishes
- Öçpoçmaq
- Qistibi
