= Chak-chak =

Deep-fried sweet dough

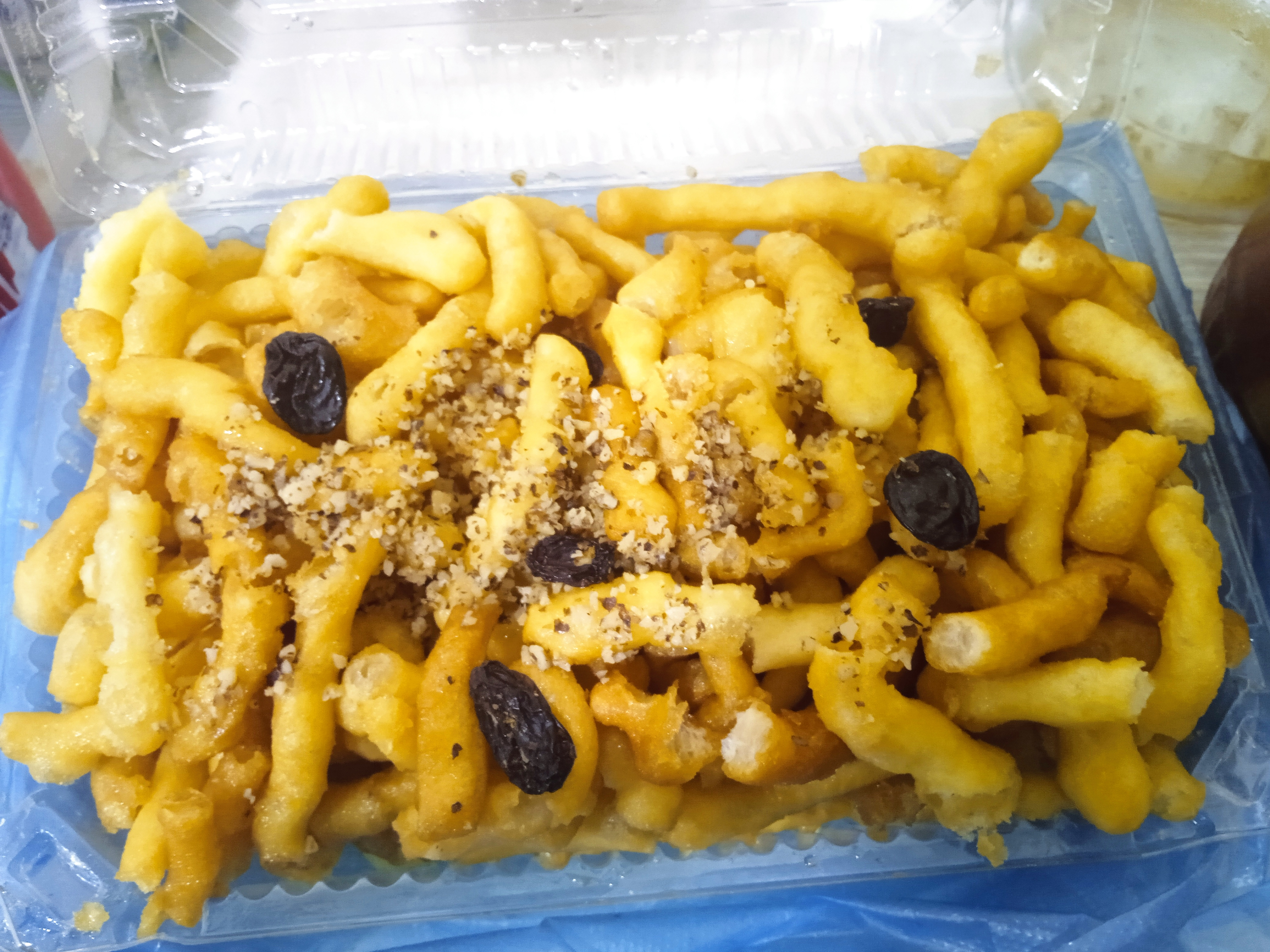
- Type: Doughnut
- Region or state: Central Asia
- Main ingredients: Dough, optionally hazelnuts

Chak-chak (Note: Tatar: чәкчәк, cəkcək or чәк-чәк; Bashkir: сәк-сәк, sək-sək; Russian: чак-чак, chak-chak) (/tʃækˈtʃæk/) is a popular fried dough food in Tatarstan, Bashkortostan, Tajikistan, Uzbekistan, Kazakhstan, Kyrgyzstan and other parts of Central Asia.

Chak-chak is made from unleavened dough cut and rolled into hazelnut-sized balls, which are then deep-fried in oil. Optionally, hazelnuts or dried fruit (e.g. apricots and raisins) are added to the mixture. The fried balls are stacked in a mound in a special mold and drenched with hot honey. After cooling and hardening, chak-chak may optionally be decorated with hazelnuts and dried fruits.

Traditional wedding chak-chak is larger and is often covered with candies and dragées. The biggest chak-chak weighed 4,026.4 kilograms (8,877 lb) and was prepared on 14 June 2018 during the start of the 2018 FIFA World Cup in Kazan.

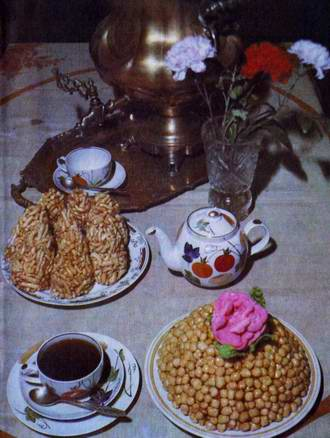
Talkysh kaleve (left) and chak-chak (right)

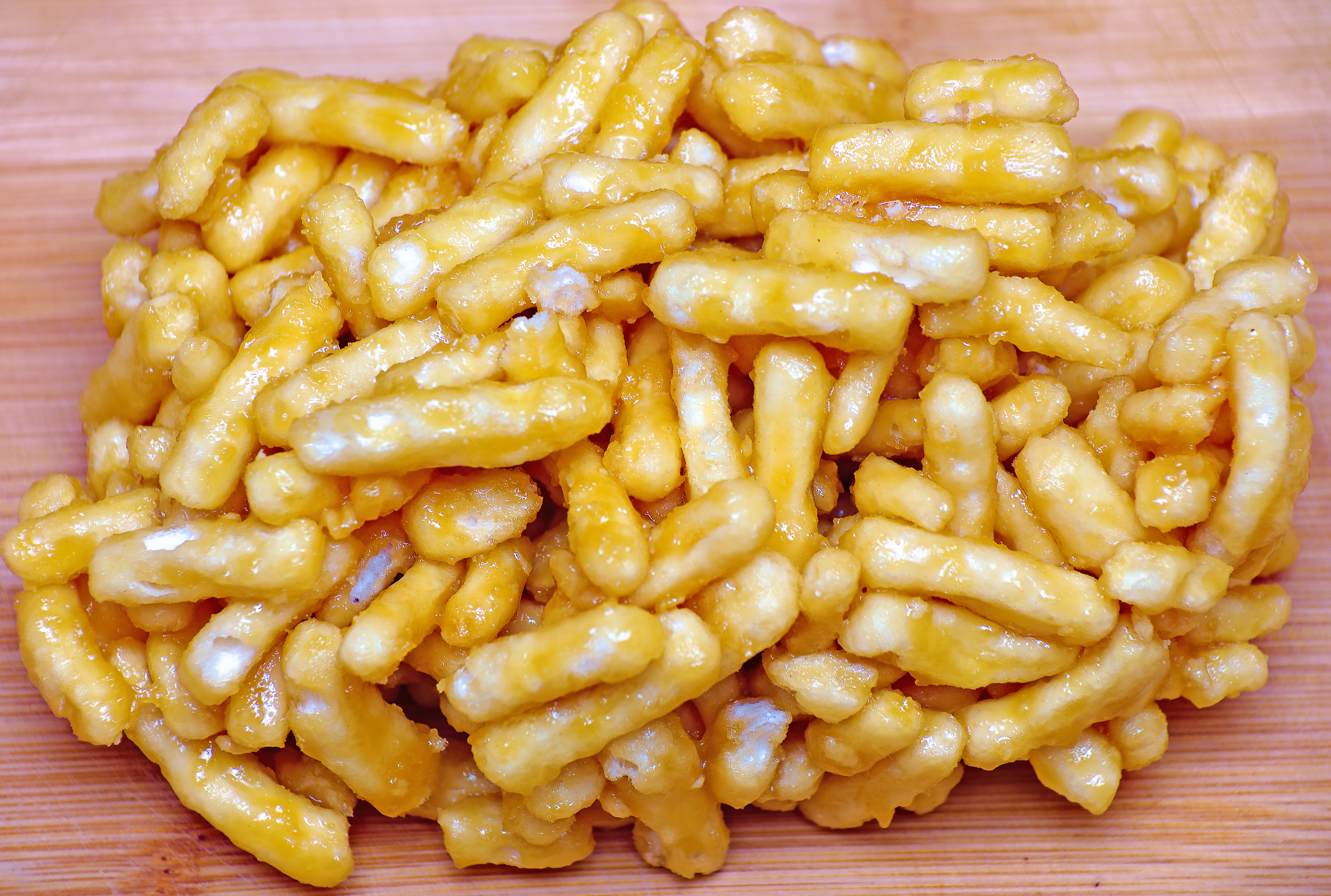
Commercially produced chak-chak from Kazan, Tatarstan, Russia

== Types ==
- If the dough is fried as noodles, chak-chak is called boxara käläwäse (Tatar: бохара кәләвәсе, [bɔxɑˈrɑ kælæwæˈse], i.e. bukharan käläwä).
- Kazakh shek-shek is similar to boxara käläwäse.
- Uzbek chakchak comes as half rounded balls, noodles, and flakes.
- Tajik chaqchaq comes in both types, as balls and as noodles.

== See also ==
- Gulab jamun
- List of doughnut varieties
- List of fried dough varieties
- List of Russian dishes
- Bashkir cuisine
- Tatar cuisine
- Lokma (a similar dish originating in Turkey)
- Mee siput
- Rengginang
- Struffoli
- Sachima (a similar dish in Manchu cuisine)
- Gavvalu (a similar dish in India)
- Funnel cake
