= Fermentation lock =

Device used in production of fermented beverages

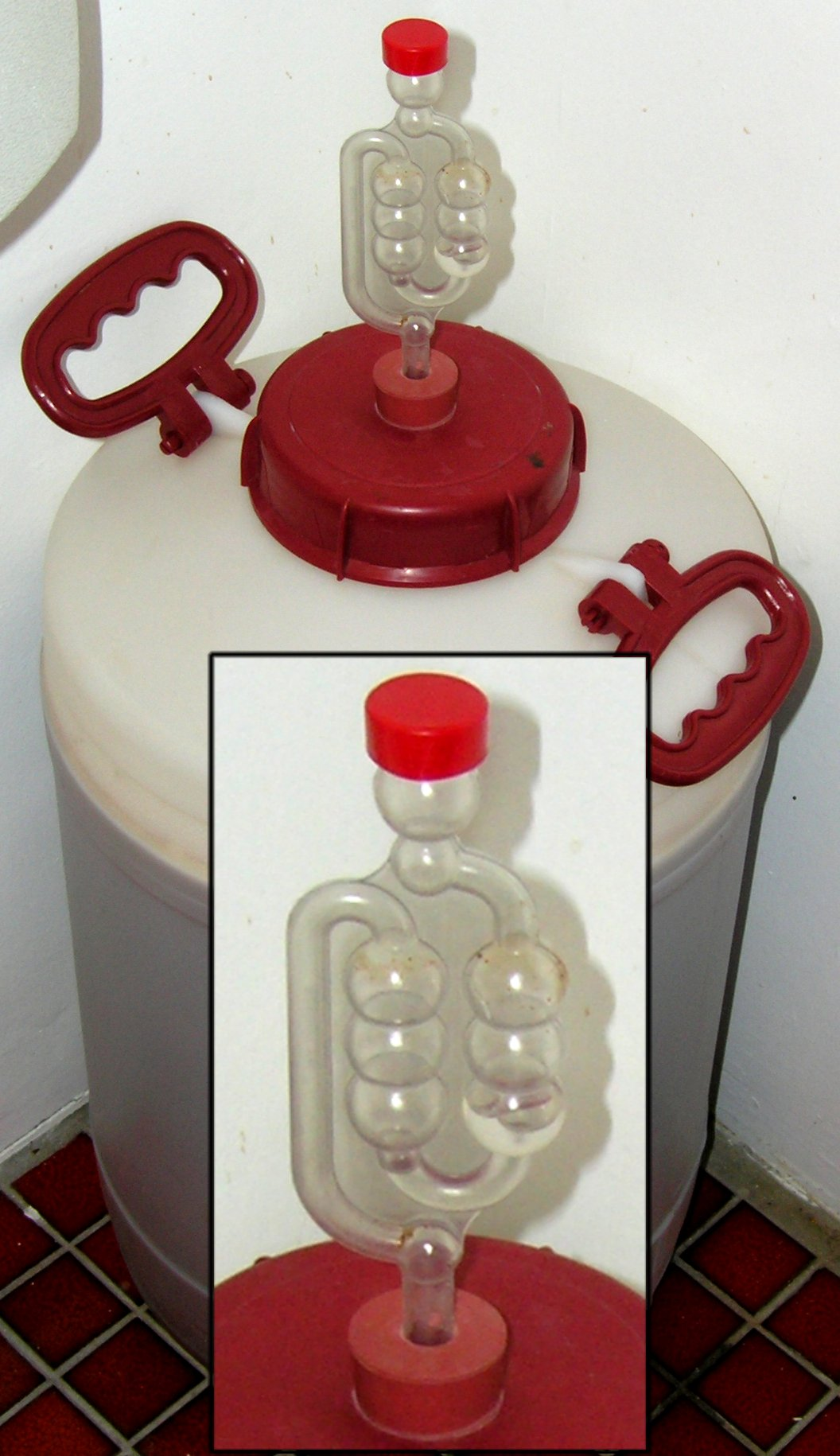
A homebrewing vessel with air lock

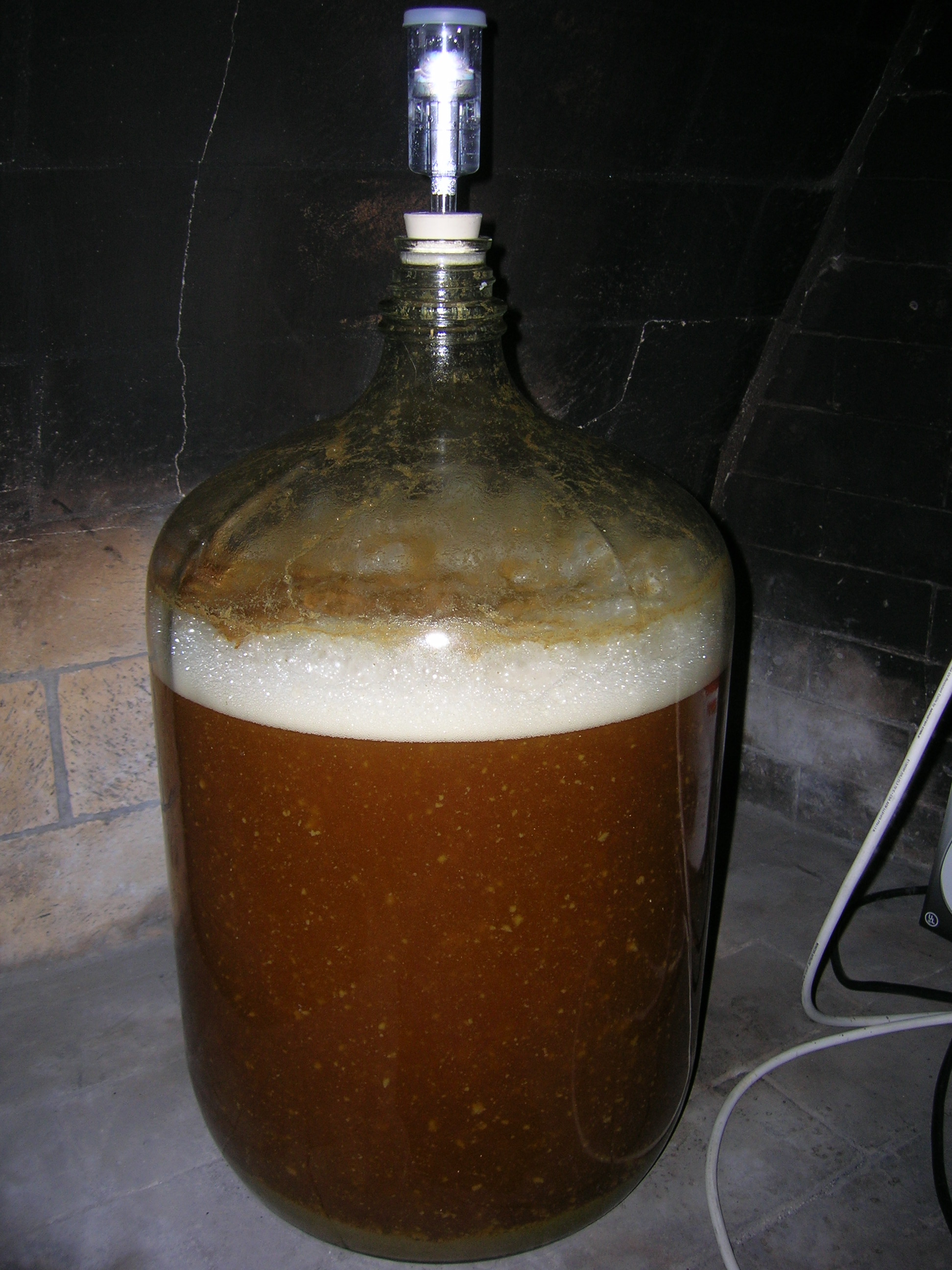
A 25 L (6 1/2 US gal) glass carboy with lock acting as a fermentation vessel for beer

A fermentation lock, colloquially air lock or just lock, is a device used in the production of fermented beverages, especially beer brewing and wine making.

Locks work when filled halfway with water, allowing carbon dioxide released during fermentation to escape the brewing vessel while not allowing air to enter it, thus avoiding oxidation. When gas pressure inside the container exceeds the prevailing atmospheric pressure, said gas will push its way through the water as individual bubbles into the outside air. A sanitizing solution, usually sulfur dioxide or alcohol, is sometimes placed in the fermentation lock to prevent contamination of the beverage in case the water is inadvertently drawn into the fermenter. This device may take the form of a tube connected to the headspace of the fermenting vessel into a tub of sanitized liquid or a simpler device mounted directly on top of the fermentation vessel.

Currently, top-mounted three-piece locks are the most popular form of fermentation lock. Other models contain bulbous chambers, allowing for a broader range of pressure equalization. These bulbous locks were generally made of hand-blown glass and are nowadays often made of clear plastic.

The use of perforated rubber balloons offers an easy and inexpensive alternative to conventional airlocks: as used primarily in homebrewing, the balloon is stretched over the orifice of the fermentation vessel and, if necessary, tightened with rubber bands. It is then perforated with a needle. These punctures, while not completely airtight, sufficiently protect the vessel's contents from contamination and allow the gases produced by fermentation to evacuate from the vessel as the pressure rises and the balloon inflates.

== See also ==
- Fermentation (wine)
- Brewing § Fermenting
- Harsch crock
- Gas bubbler
