= Crock (dishware) =

Container used to cook food in ovens or direct fire

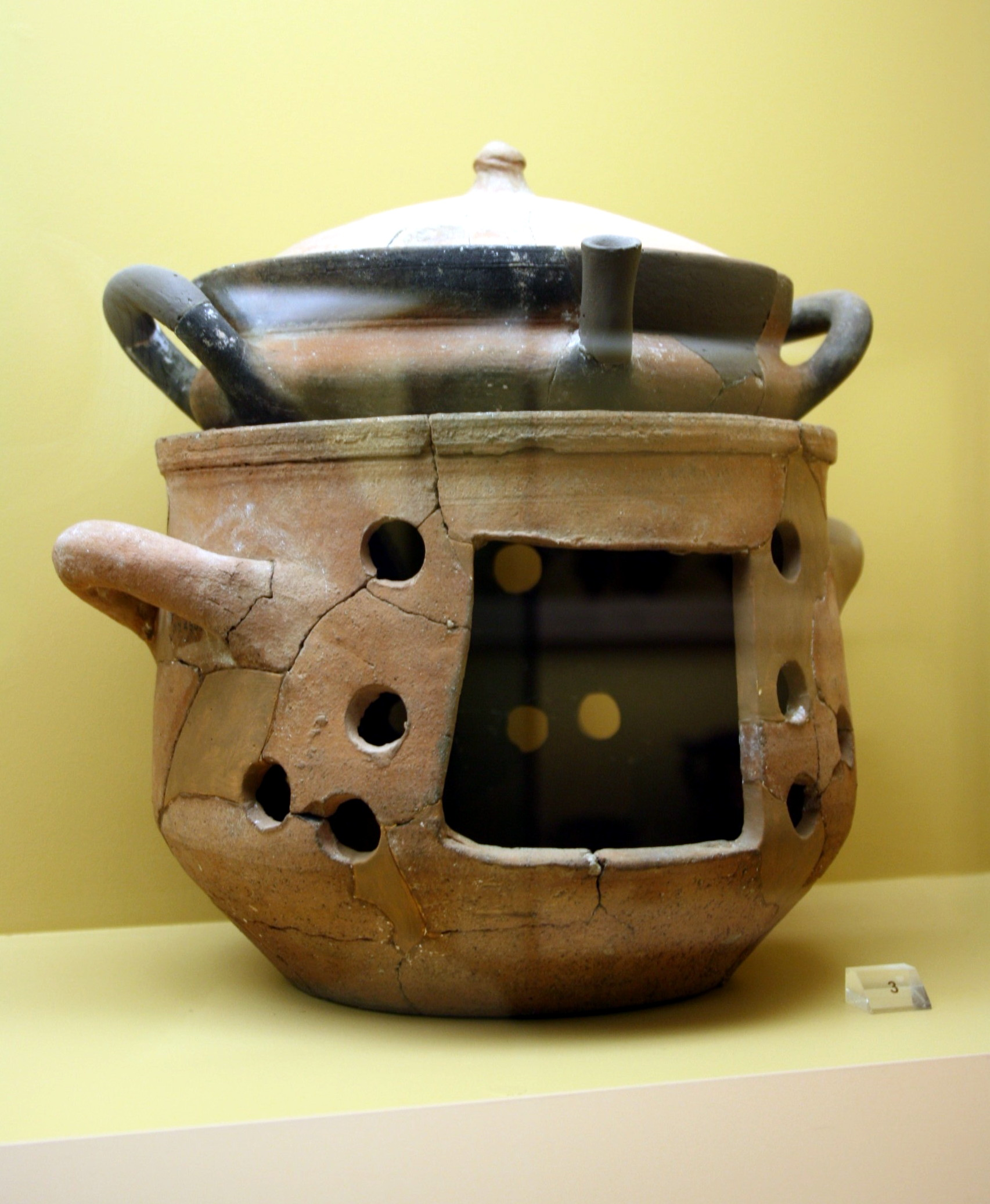
Ancient Greek casserole and brazier, 6th/4th century BC, exhibited in the Ancient Agora Museum in Athens, housed in the Stoa of Attalus

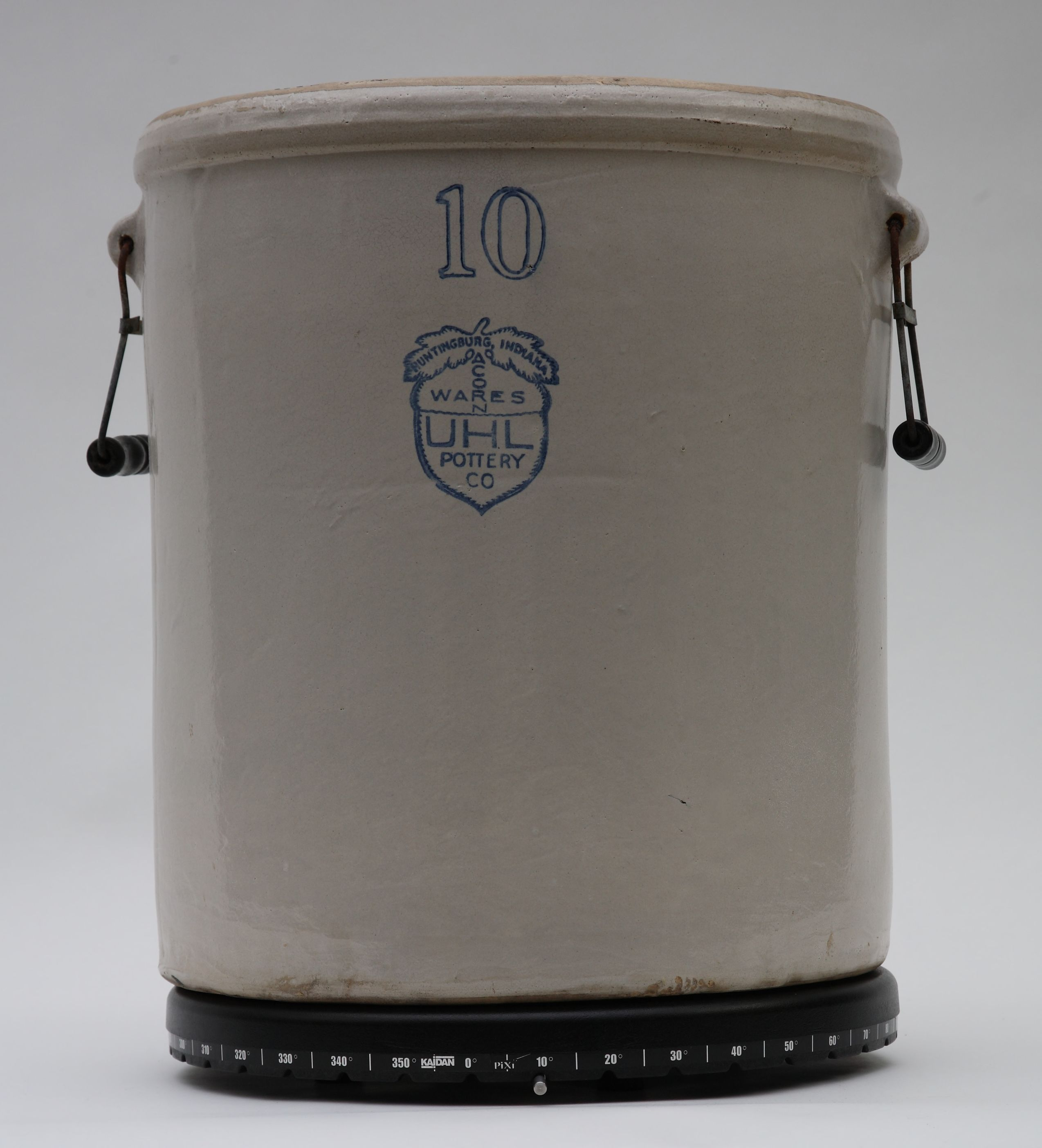
UHL Pottery Co. cream and blue crock with handles

A crock is a pottery container sometimes used for food or water, synonymous with the word "pot", and sometimes used for chemicals. Derivative terms include "crockery" and "crock-pot".

Crocks, or "preserving crocks", were used in household kitchens before refrigeration to hold and preserve foods such as butter, salted meats, and pickled vegetables. Crocks are made from stoneware, which is a nonporous ceramic that is water-tight, even without glaze.

Larger crocks (20-30 gallons) are used for curing meats. The meat is covered with a brine made of water, sugar, salt, and a small amount of sodium nitrate or saltpeter. The meat is kept submerged in the brine by two semicircle weights designed to fit inside the crock. The crocks are then topped with a lid and stored in a cool, dry location.

Smaller crocks (1-10 gallons) are commonly used for preserving vegetables such as cucumbers for pickles, and cabbage for sauerkraut. Preserving food in this manner allows people to keep summer vegetables throughout the winter months when gardens and crops are not producing.

Vintage crocks can still be found and purchased. Aside from food storage, they're commonly used for decorative purposes, or as storage containers, in interior design.

Crocks of all sizes are still produced and sold today.

A gypsy's crock is a (traditionally three-legged) cooking pot.

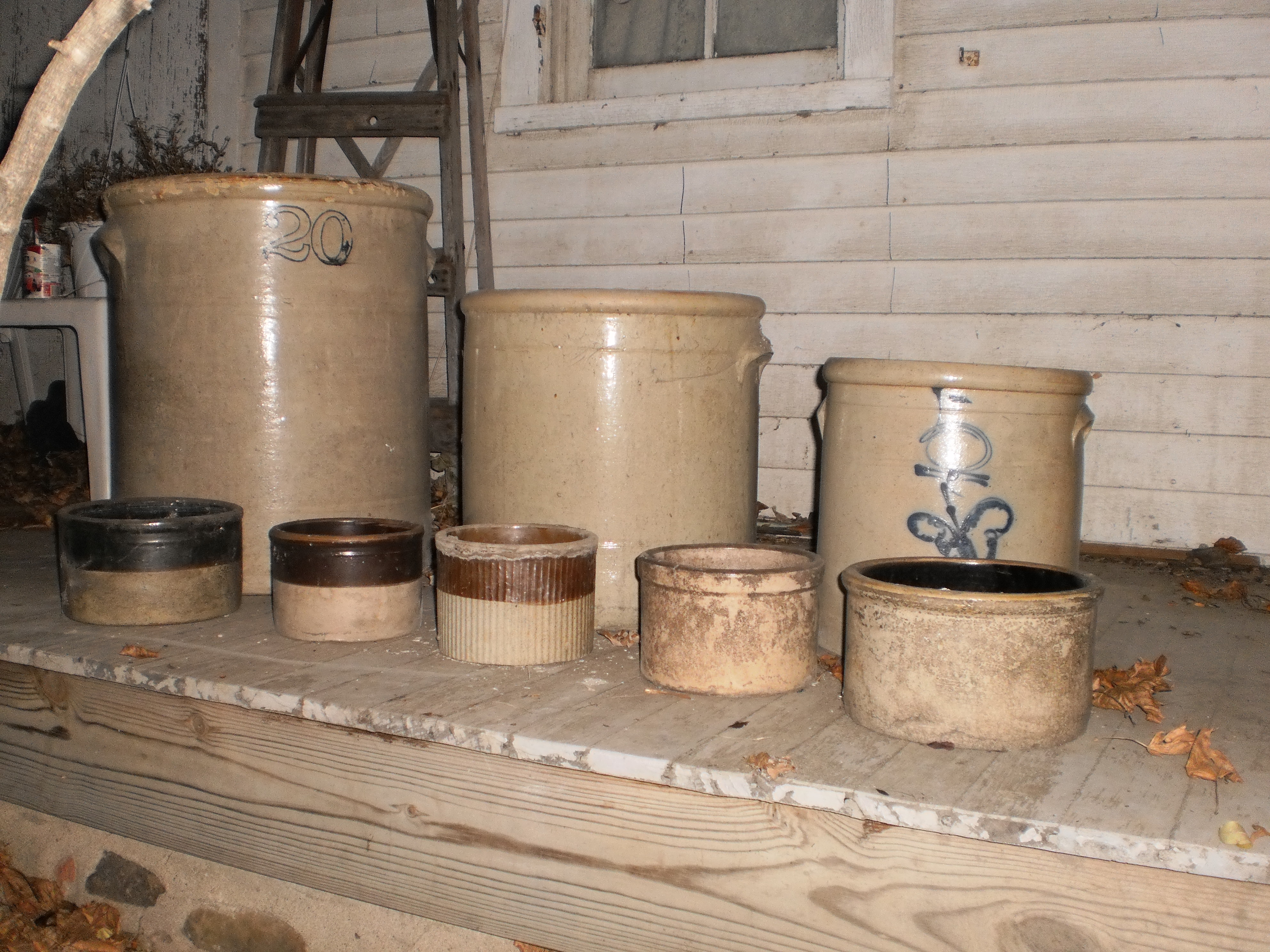
Eight basic open crocks; the largest one is 20 gallons

== See also ==
- Beanpot
- Cassole
- Harsch crock
- Stoneware
- Cazuela
