= Christina Perozzi and Hallie Beaune =

Pair of American writers

Christina Perozzi and Hallie Beaune are a pair of authors, who together maintain the website TheBeerChicks.com (originally called "Beer for Chicks"), where they cover beer and alcohol related topics.

In 2009 Perozzi was named "Best Beer Sommelier" by Los Angeles Magazine and in 2012 Perozzi and Beaune published The Naked Pint: An Unadulterated Guide to Craft Beer and hosted the Cooking Channel special Eat This, Drink That.

The two met while working together at Father's Office, a pub in Santa Monica, California.

== Bibliography ==
- The Naked Pint: An Unadulterated Guide to Craft Beer (2009)
- The Naked Brewer: Fearless Homebrewing, Tips, Tricks & Rule-Breaking Recipes (2012)
