= Qistibi =

Bashkir, Tatar and Udmurt flatbread dish

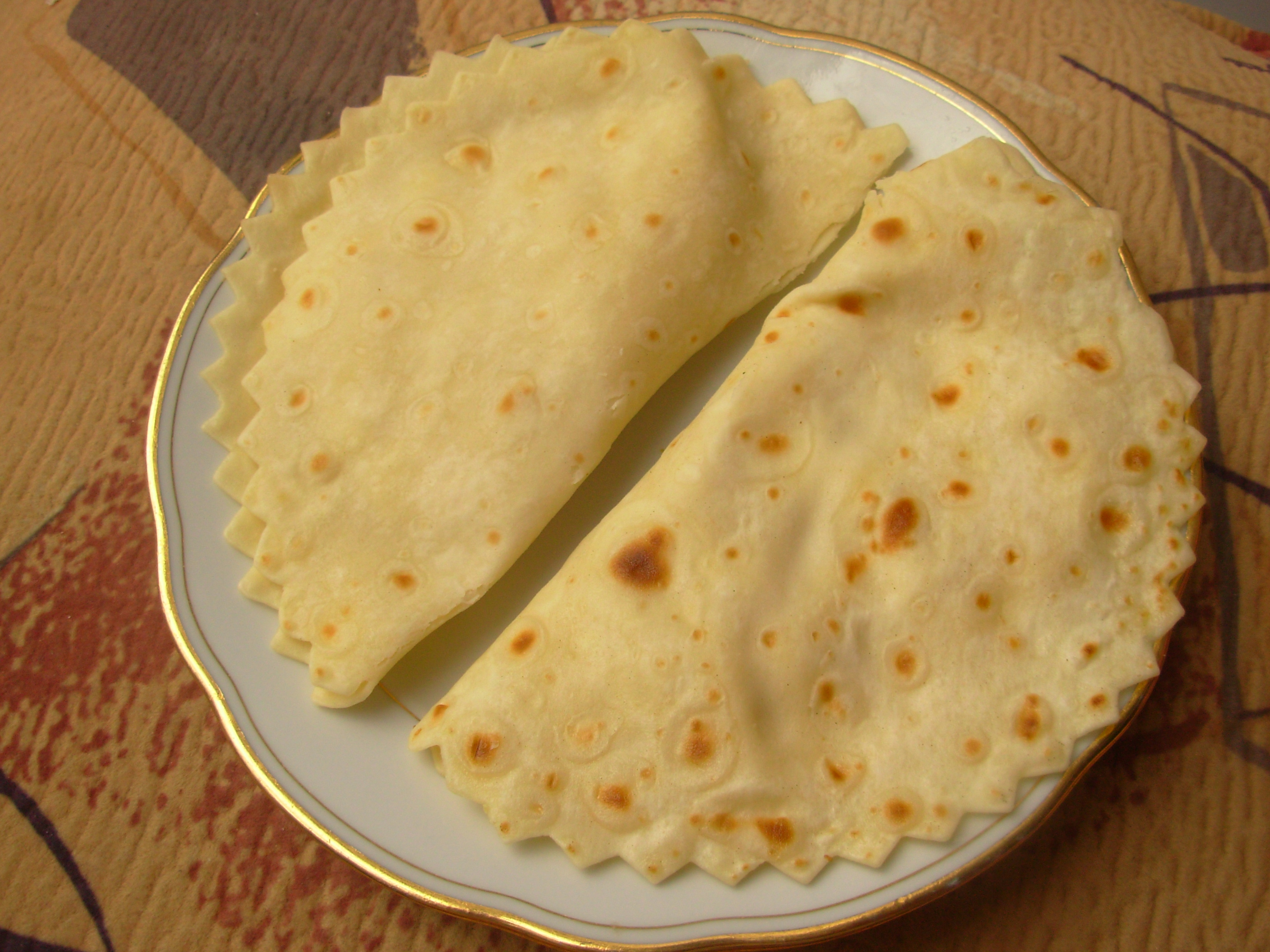
Qistibi

Qistibi or kistibi (Bashkir: ҡыҫтыбый, romanized: qıśtıbıy, Tatar: кыстыбый, romanized: qıstıbí, Udmurt: кыстыбей) is a well-known traditional dish in Tatarstan, Bashkortostan and Chuvashia. Qistibi is roasted flatbread with various fillings inside. The dough should be unleavened. The most common filling is mashed potato but it may also be ragout or millet. The filling is placed on one half of the flat cake and is covered by the other half. Later, clarified butter is spread on the flat cakes.

== See also ==
- Çiberek
- Gözleme
- List of Russian dishes
- List of stuffed dishes
- Peremech
- Puran poli
