= Kimay =

Beef dish of Kazakh cuisine

Kimay (Қимай) is a traditional, hearty, and highly esteemed dish of Kazakh cuisine, prepared using beef (or occasionally horse meat) during the autumn-winter seasonal slaughter known as Sogym. Although its appearance and preparation closely resemble horse meat shuzhuk (a type of traditional sausage), its distinct ingredients and meat cuts lead locals to frequently refer to it as the "beef kazy".

== Preparation Technology ==
The preparation of kimay relies on the thoroughly cleaned and washed large intestine (rectum or colon) of the slaughtered animal, usually a cow. The casing is stuffed with a balanced 50/50 mixture of diced lean meat—such as brisket, neck, flank, or shoulder cuts—and rich internal fat.

To enhance the flavor profile and extend the shelf life of the meat, the following seasonings are traditionally incorporated into the mixture:

- Chopped or crushed onions;
- Ground black pepper;
- Coarse rock salt.

Once the casing is densely packed with the meat and fat mixture, both ends are skewered with small wooden splints (shorke) and tied securely with twine, mirroring the technique used for traditional sausages.

== Preservation and Serving ==
After assembly, the fresh kimay is hung in a cool, well-ventilated, shaded area to undergo air-drying or curing. It can be preserved throughout the winter months, making it a valuable food source during early spring when fresh meat supplies typically dwindle.

Kimay is primarily prepared by boiling. To prevent the natural casing from bursting as the water heats up, the sausage is pricked in several places with a needle just before the water reaches a boil. The fully cooked dish is then cooled, sliced into rounds, and served as a premium topping over beshbarmak (barmak) or presented as a standalone cold appetizer for honored guests. Alternatively, freshly made kimay can be pan-fried directly in a kazan immediately after the slaughter.

== Characteristics ==
The defining characteristic of kimay is its nearly equal proportion of fat to lean meat. Because beef is naturally leaner and drier than horse meat, the inherent richness of the large intestine casing combined with the internal fat suet ensures that the final product turns out exceptionally tender, juicy, and aromatic upon boiling.
