= Bashkir cuisine =

Cuisine of the Bashkir people

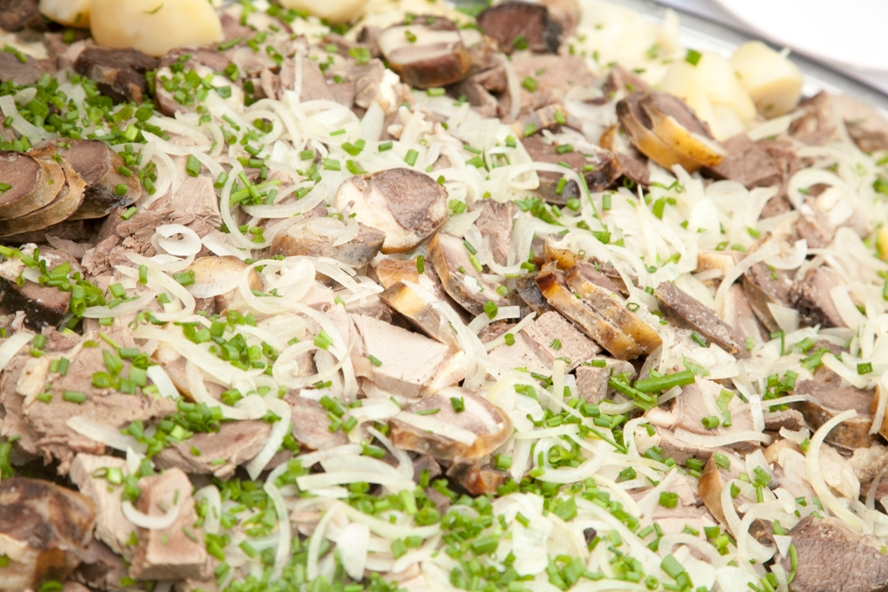
Beshbarmak with potatoes

Bashkir cuisine (Bashkir: башҡорт аш-һыуы, romanized: başqurt aş-hıvı) is the traditional cuisine of the Bashkirs. Their way of life, and the predominance of cattle breeding contributed culture, traditions, and cuisine of the Bashkirs.

== Traditional dishes and products ==
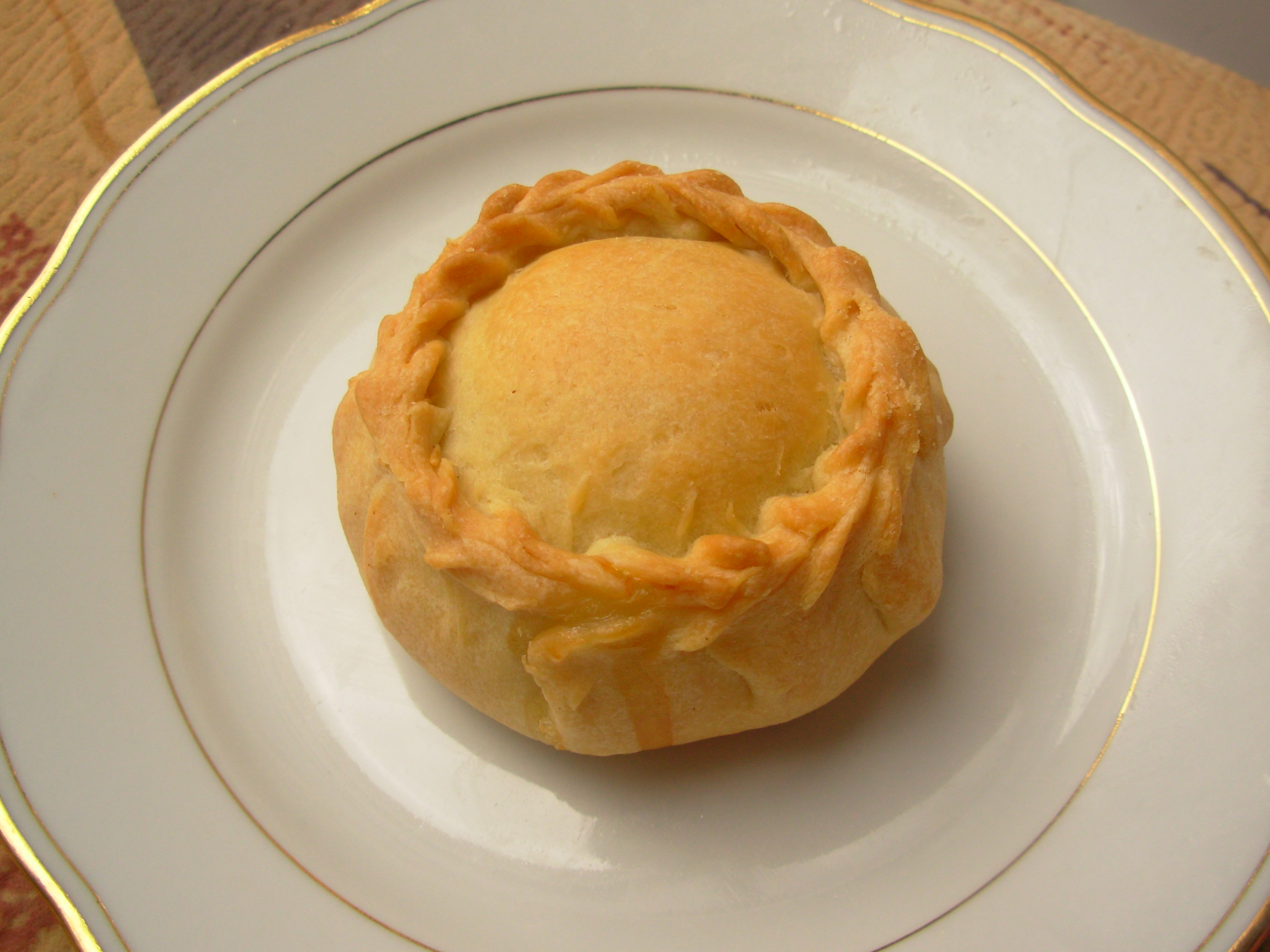
Boekken

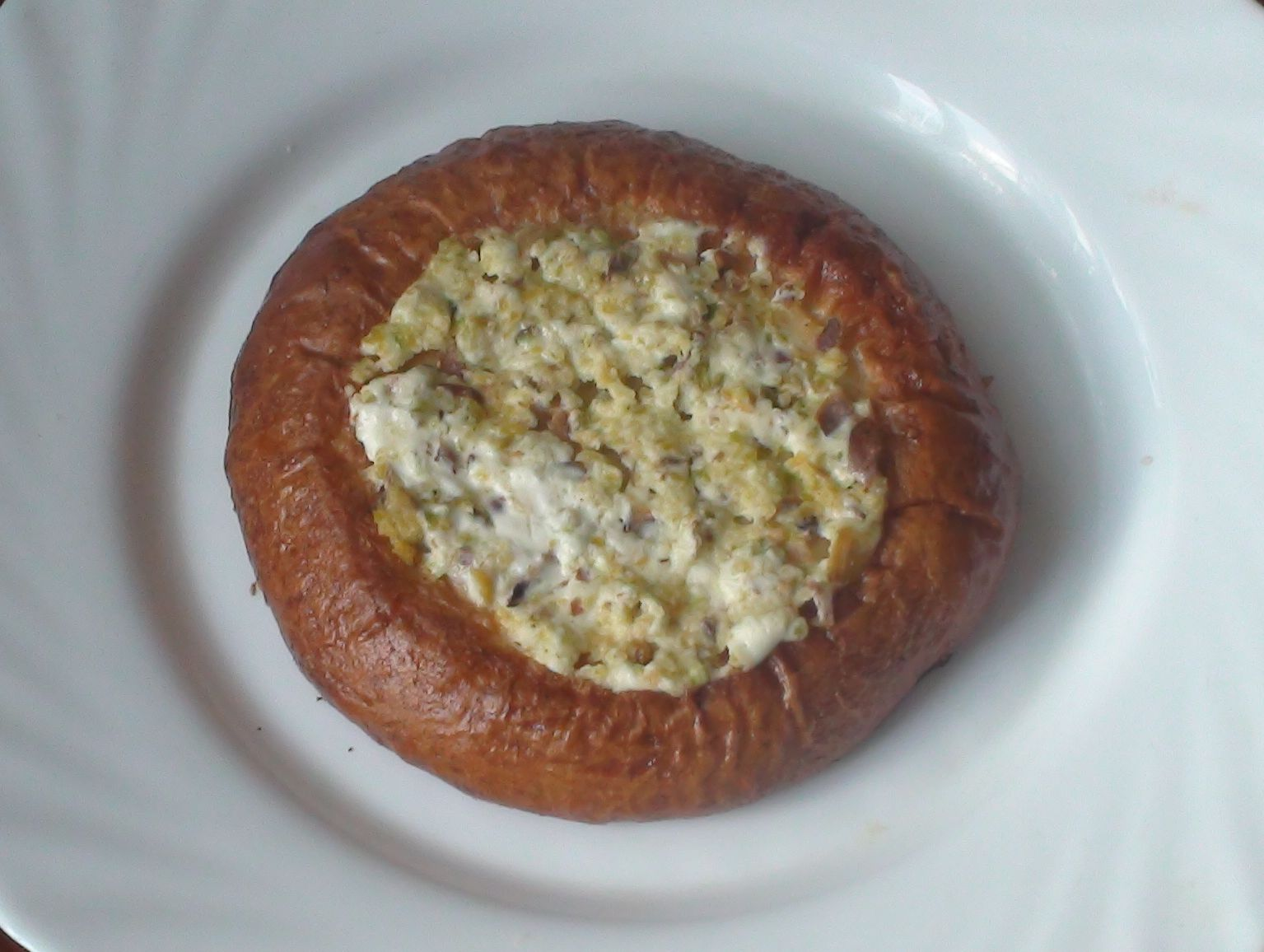
Beremes

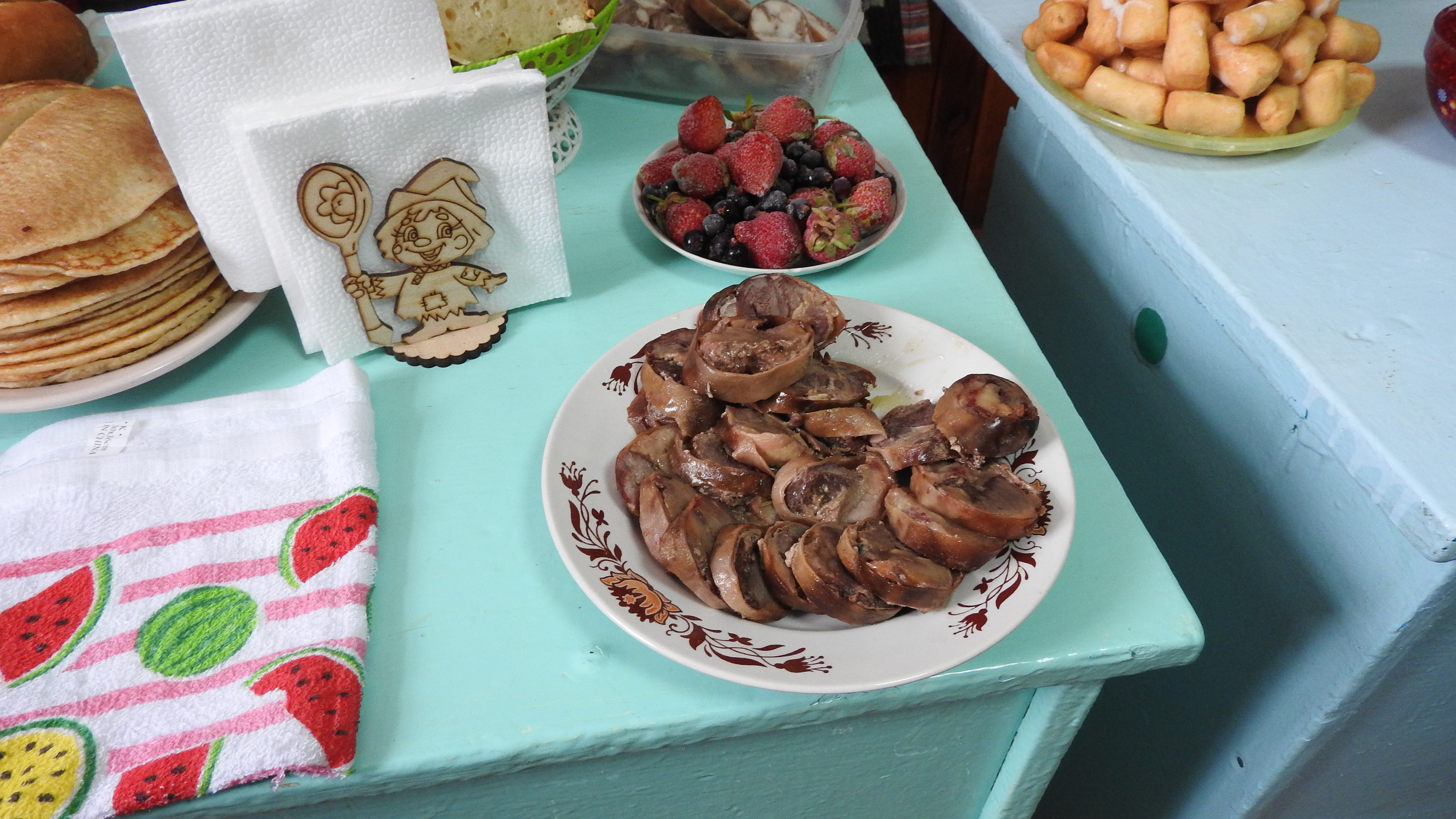
Qazy (homemade horse sausage)

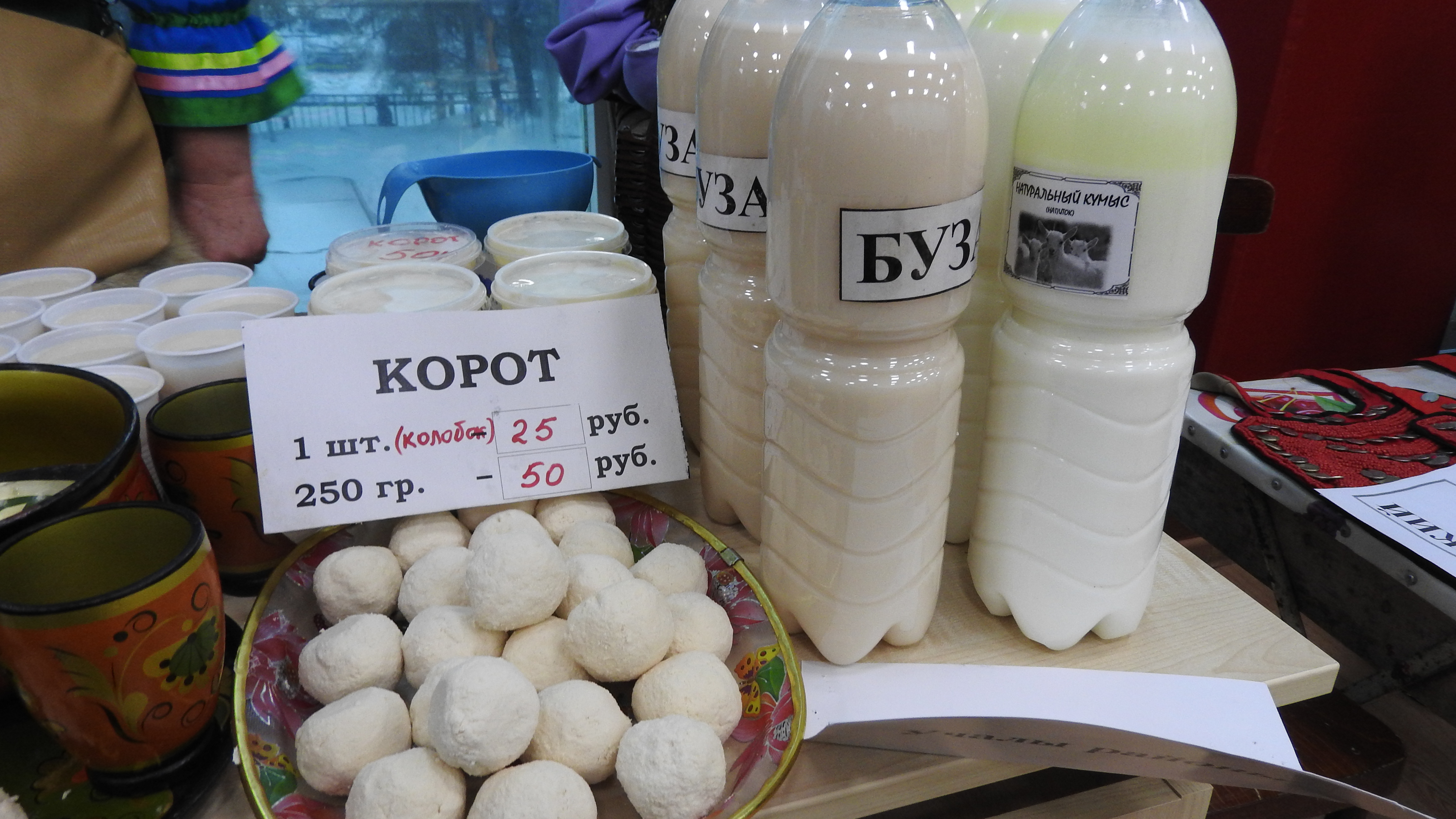
Buza, milk products (koumiss, korot)

Bashkir dishes are distinguished by a small number of classic spices: only black and red pepper are used. Another feature of Bashkir dishes is the abundance of meat in all hot dishes and snacks. The love of Bashkirs for horse sausage «Qazı» and horse fat deserves special attention: Bashkirs love to eat horsemeat with thick slices of fat, washed down with sour broth Qurut (fermented milk product), neutralizing the effects of such an amount of fat. The semi-nomadic way of life (cattle ranching) led to the formation of a wide range of long-term storage products. The bulk of Bashkir national dishes are boiled, dried and dried horse meat, lamb, dairy products, dried berries, dried cereals, honey. Examples are dishes such as Qazı (horse sausage), Qaqlanğan et (jerky), pastille, Qımıð, siyəli harı may (cherry in ghee), moyıl mayı (bird cherry oil), Qurut (dry kashk), irimsik (cottage cheese) and ayran (doogh)— All these dishes are stored for a relatively long time even in the summer heat and it is convenient to take them with you on the go.

It is believed that qımıð was prepared exactly on the road — a vessel with mare's milk was tied to the saddle and hung out during the day.

The traditional Bashkir dish beshbarmak is prepared from boiled meat and salma (a variety of coarsely chopped noodles), abundantly sprinkled with herbs and onions and seasoned with qurut. This is another noticeable feature of Bashkir cuisine: dairy products are often served to dishes —qurut or sour cream. Most Bashkir dishes are easy to cook and nutritious.

Dishes like ayran, boða (wheat or oatmeal drink), qað, qatlama, qımıð, mantı, üyrə (soup), ıvmas aşı and many others are considered national dishes of many peoples from Ural mountains to Far East.

=== Bashkir honey ===
Bashkir honey is known for its taste and is a matter of pride for Bashkirs. Not a single tea party is possible without real Bashkir honey, a sandwich with fresh rustic sour cream is one of the examples of Bashkir national cuisine. For Bashkirs, a matter of honor is the possession of real Bashkir honey (Burzyan bee), produced by relatives, beekeepers.

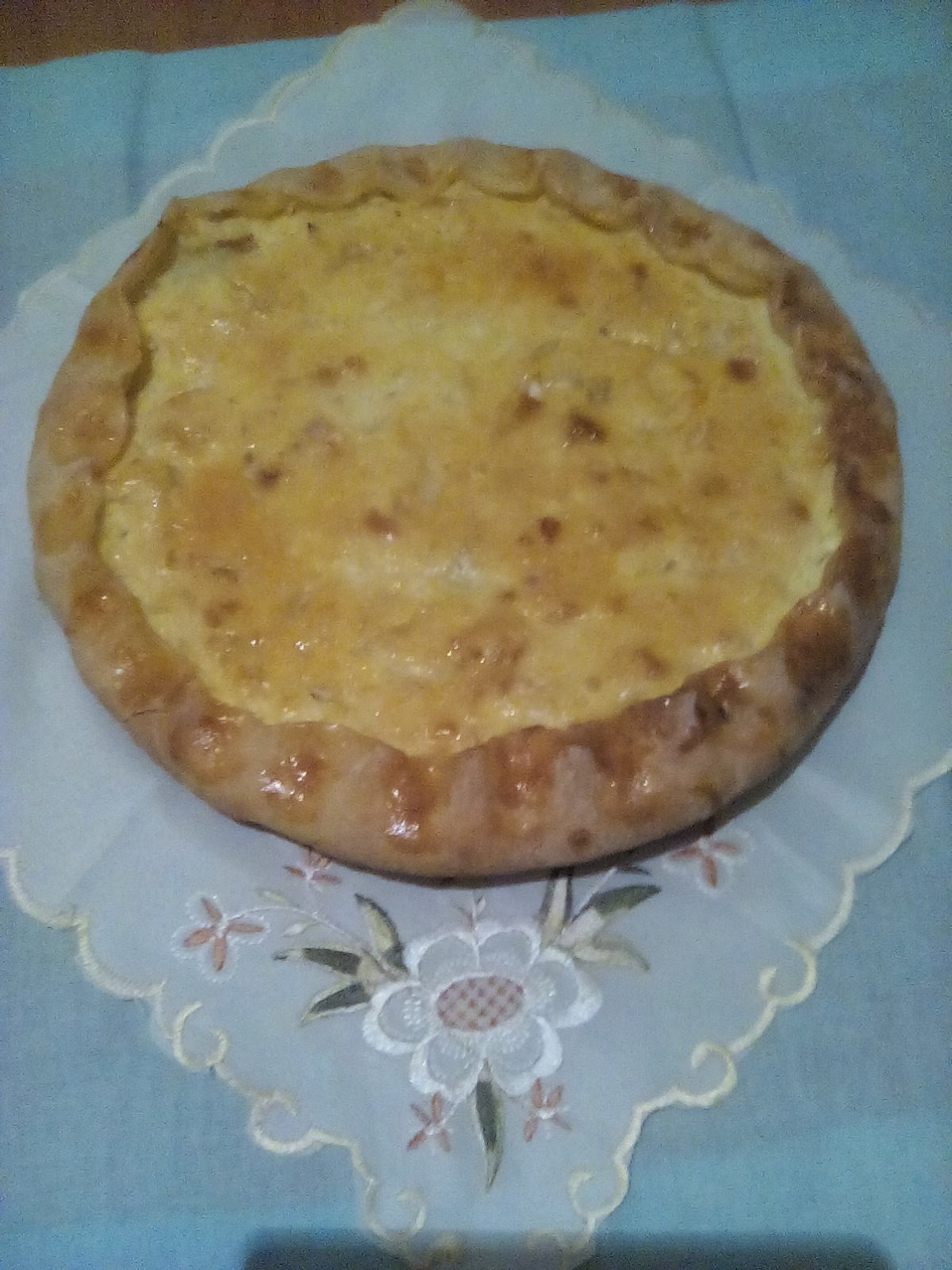
Beremes with cottage cheese

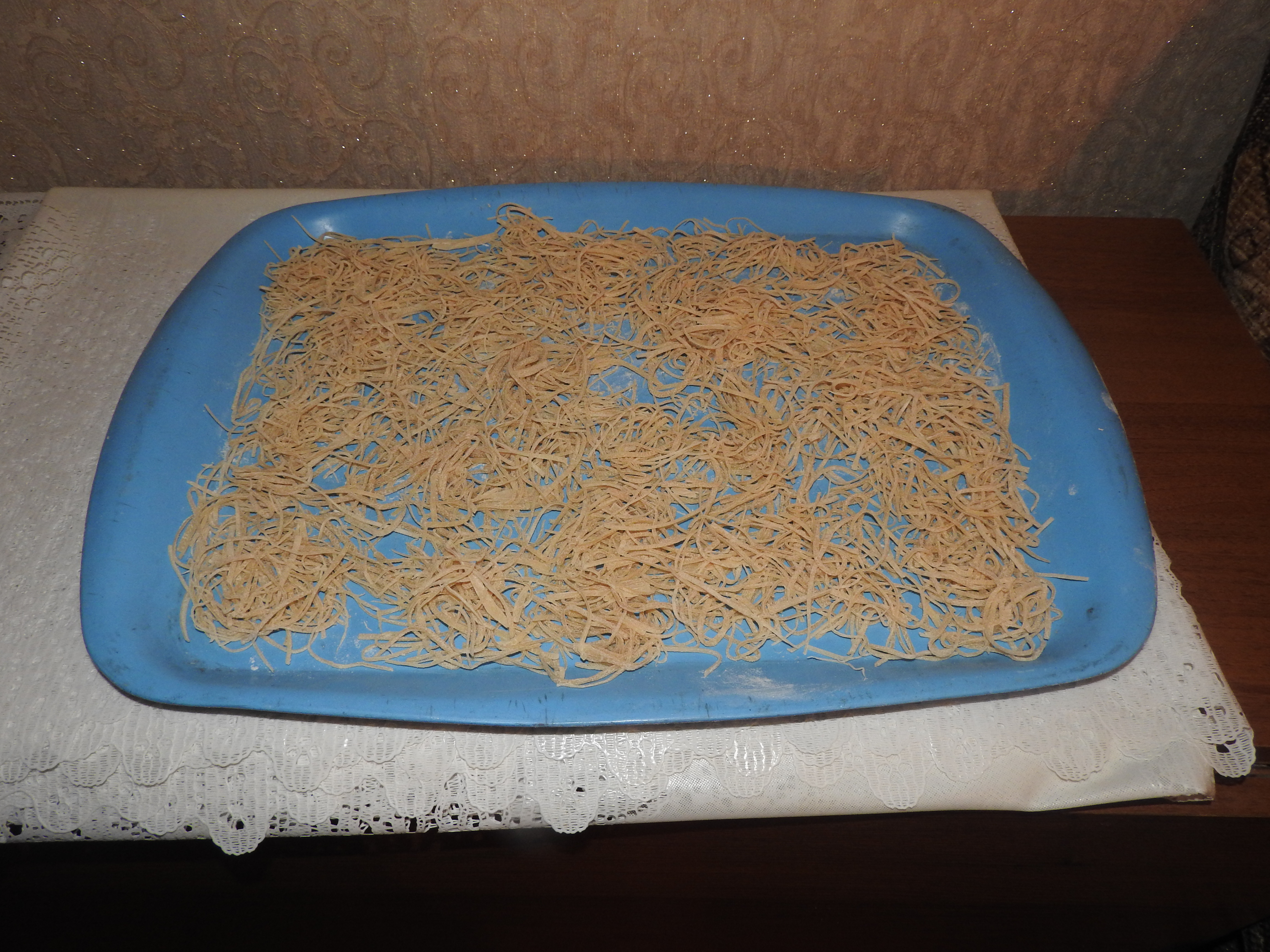
Noodles

=== Qımıð ===
Qımıð (Koumiss) is the national healing drink of the Bashkirs . The ability to make delicious koumiss has long been valued and transmitted from generation to generation. For qımıð, special breeds of horses are preferred (Bashkir horse). Qımıð is consumed fresh, otherwise it quickly becomes acidic and loses its healing qualities. It contains a small amount of alcohol.

=== Modern Bashkir dishes ===
Modern Bashkir dishes have preserved all the originality of traditional Bashkir cuisine and complemented it, diversifying the range of products and serving. Despite the abundance and luxury of modern dishes, traditional dishes occupy a special place in the Bashkir cuisine and on the festive table. At the festive Bashkir table will definitely be beshbarmak, qaðı, horpa (soup-bouillon), bukken, or chak-chak.

== Bashkir tea party ==
The Bashkirs have a popular expression — "drink tea." Behind this expression lies an invitation to the Bashkir tea party with pies, yuyasa, boiled meat, sausage, cheesecake, sour cream, jam, honey and all that the hostess has at her disposal. Drinking tea at the Bashkirs means a little snack — it is obvious that such tea is able to replace breakfast or lunch by its fullness.

Bashkirs always drink tea with milk: guests are not even asked if they should add milk to tea. The tradition of adding milk to tea is so old that in some regions the issue of when to add milk to a cup is a subject of debate: before pouring tea or after.

== Festive table ==
On holidays, the Bashkirs prepare special dishes: Bishbarmak, Chak-Chak, Belish, Gubadia and others. Chuck-chak is a must-have for any festive table. At the festive feast, it is customary for each guest to offer ulush - the proportion of game (ram, goose, etc.) The Bashkirs have many festive dishes prepared on special occasions: keyeu-bilmene (Pelmeni) - special small dumplings that are prepared for the wedding in honor of the groom, keelen-tukmasy (noodle) - special noodles that the bride prepares to show her ability: such noodles should be especially thin and crumbly.

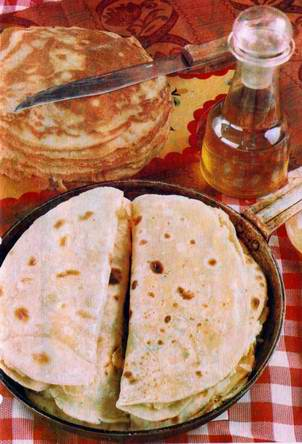
Qistibi

The chak-chak, prepared by the bride, is an obligatory part of the wedding ritual — with the washed hands the bride puts a piece of chak-chak into the mouth of all guests after the wedding. Kaz-oemahe is a special occasion for a festive feast when the hostess invites neighbors to help with geese; in the evening, at the end of work, the hostess treats everyone with fresh goose.

== Food bans ==
The prevailing food bans were associated with religious traditions. Prohibited foods included pork, carnivorous animals and poultry (falcon, kite or hoopoe meat), snake and frog meat. Also, it was impossible to eat the meat of swans and cranes (Bashkir totems). It was impossible to eat: thyroid glands, spinal cord, spleen. From fish — it is undesirable to eat fish of those species that do not have scales.

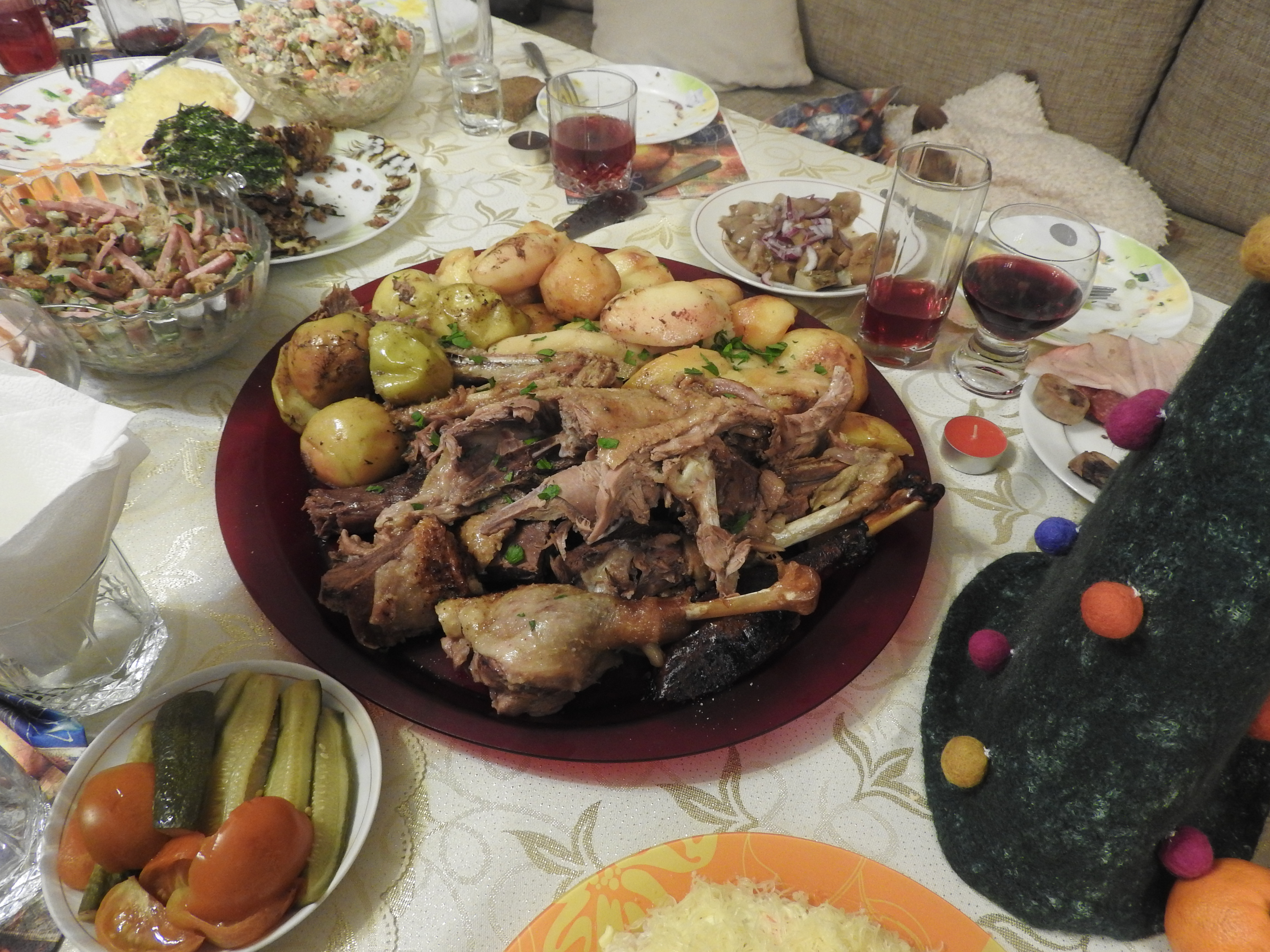
Goose

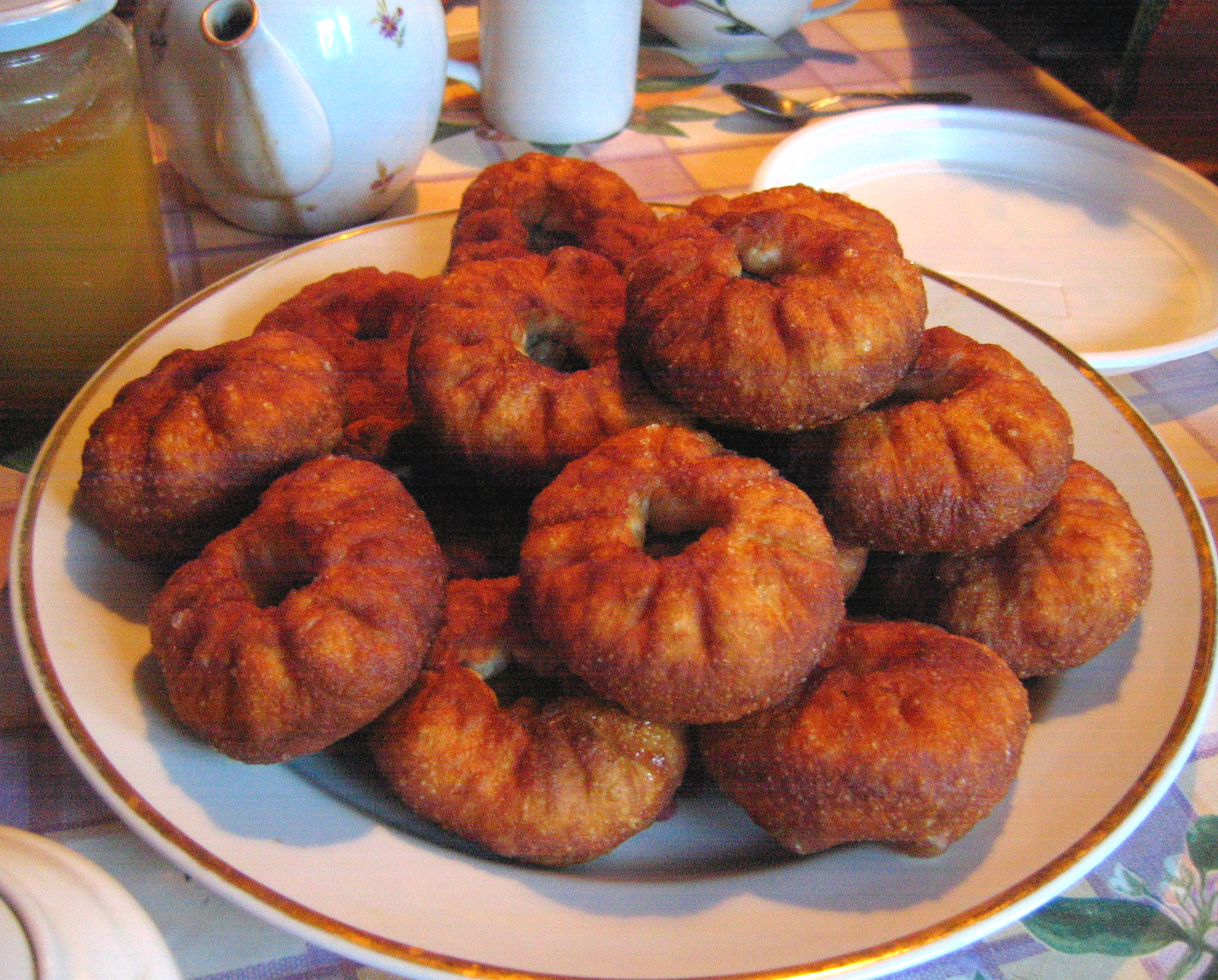
Intermitter

== Table etiquette ==
The traditional rules of the table etiquette of the Bashkirs include the following:

- Serve food immediately upon arrival
- There should be an odd number of flapjack on the table, but no less than the number of guests.
- The host touches the food first.
- The oldest guest is served first.
- The host ceases to eat as soon as the guest ceases to eat.
- If there is not enough food, and the guest is hungry, then the host should eat as little as possible to maximize saturation of the guest
- Take food and drink only with your right hand.
- Do not cut freshly baked bread with a knife, do not bite off a whole tortilla.
- You should take worse food out of a common dish, leaving the best to others.
- During the meal, keep peace with the owner and seem cheerful.
- At the end of the meal, pray for the well-being of the host.

== Literature ==
- Bashkir encyclopedia. . Ch. ed. M.A. Ilgamov. — Ufa: Bashkir Encyclopedia. Volume 3. Z-K. 2007 .-- 672 p.. — ISBN 978-5-88185-064-7
- Arslanova I.A. Traditional and modern Bashkir cuisine. Ufa, 1999.
- Dishes of Bashkir cuisine. M .: Planet, 1985.
- Khazhin R. R. Bashkir cuisine. Ufa, 2010.
