= Qazı =

Horsemeat sausages

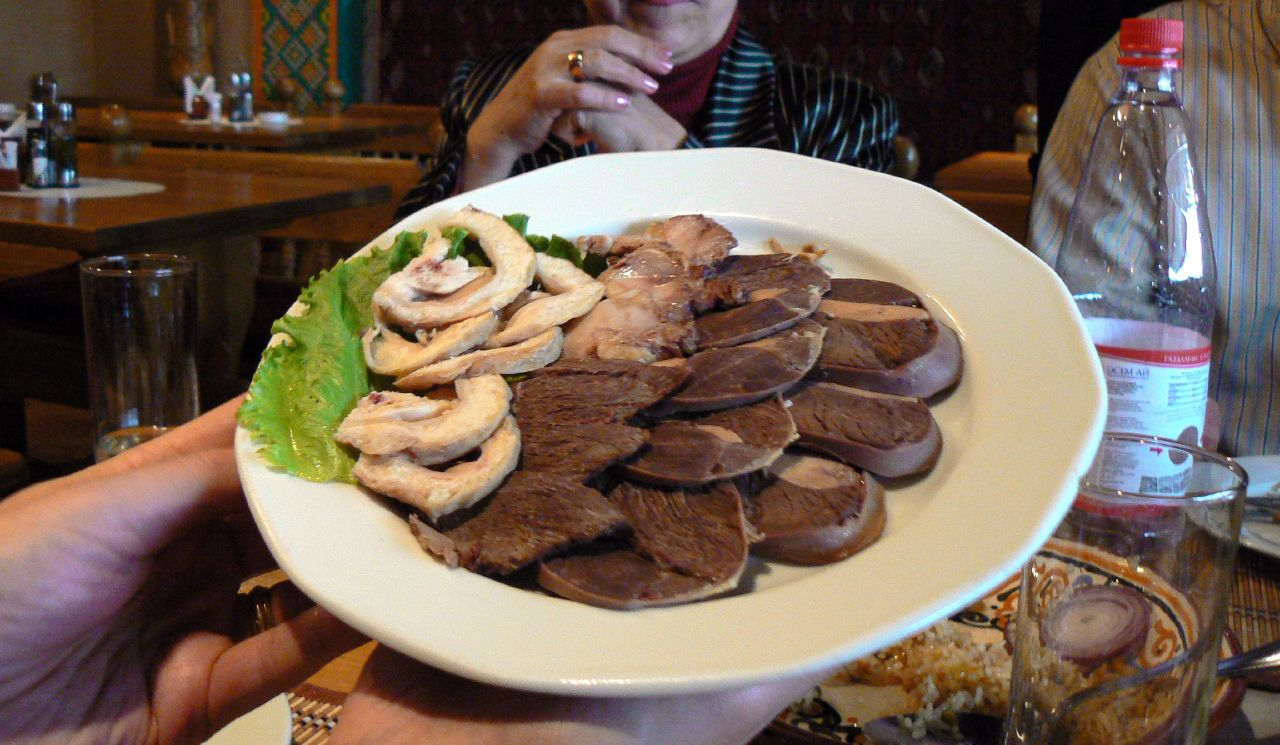
Horse meat platter – qazı is on the right

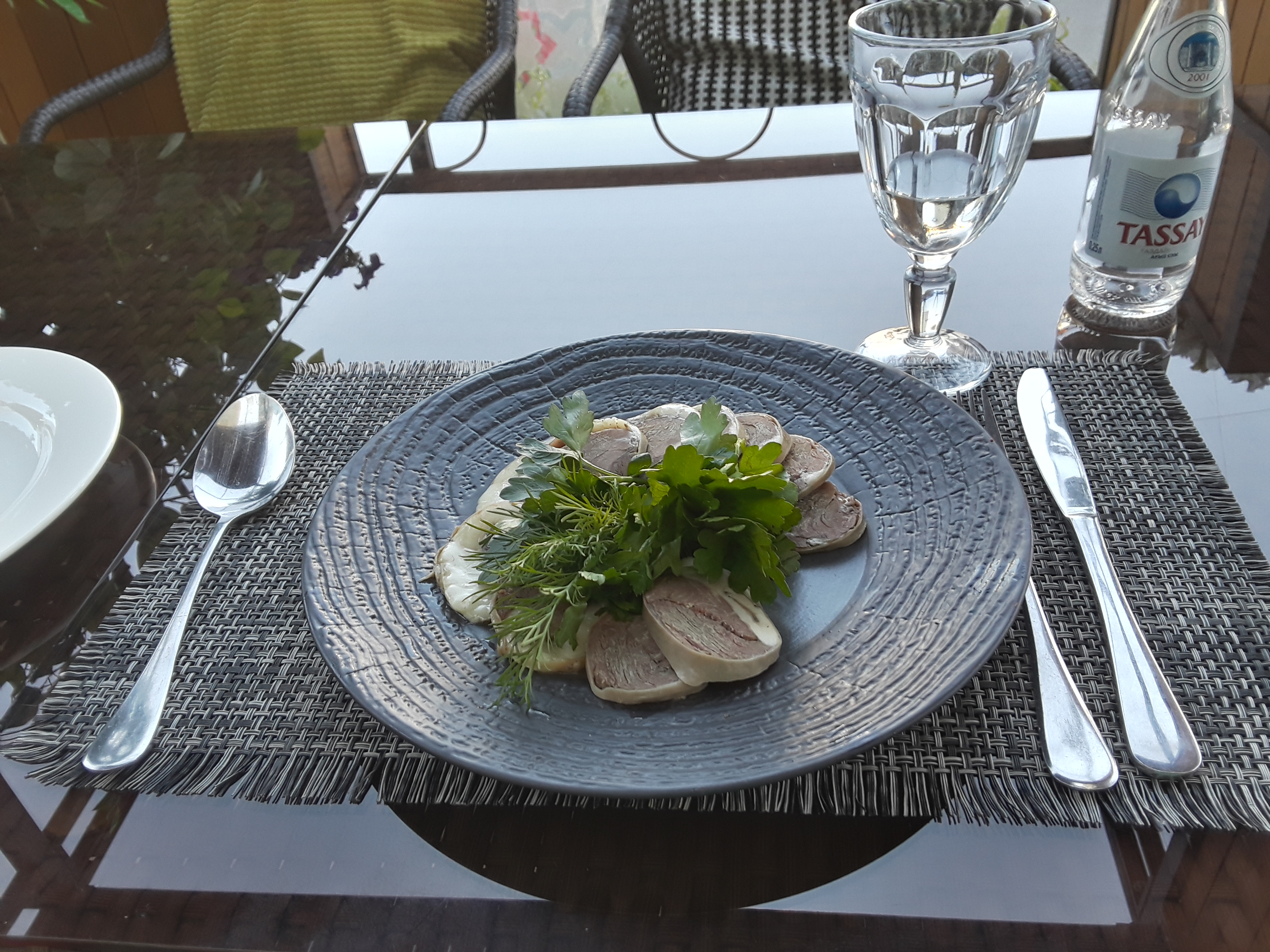
Plate of Qazı at a restaurant in Astana

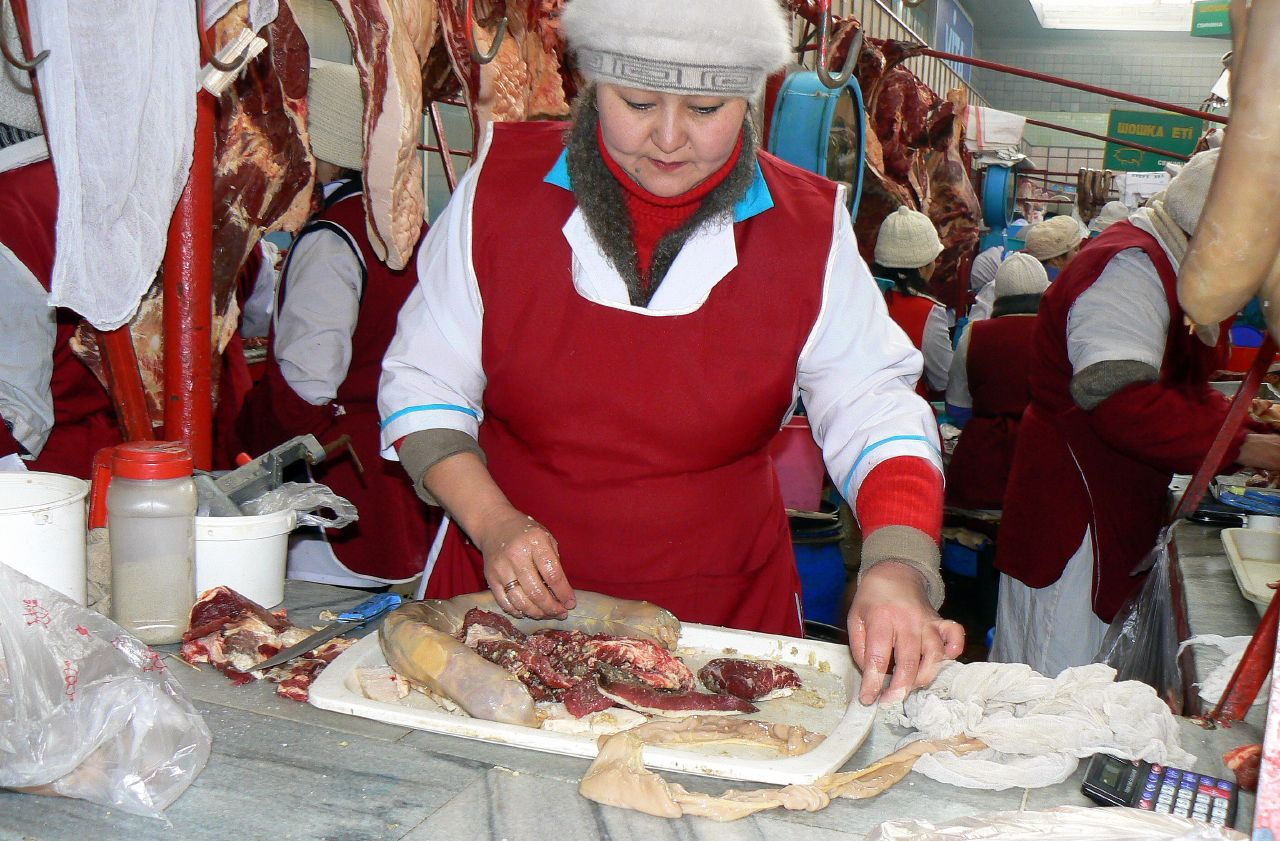
Making horse meat sausage

Qazı (Kazakh: қазы, qazı, قازى [qɑzə́]; Kyrgyz: казы [qɑzɯ]; Russian: казы-карта, kazy-karta; Tatar: казылык, romanized: qazılıq, lit. 'قازئلئق', Bashkir: ҡаҙы, romanized: qazı, lit. 'قازی', Uzbek: qazi, Yakut: хаһа) is a traditional sausage-like food of Bashkirs, Kazakhs, Tatars, Kyrgyz, Uzbeks and other Turkic or Central Asian ethnic groups. It is a common element on a dastarkhan, a table set for a festive meal. The taste has been described as smoky and earthy. Horse meat is usually used for Qazı.

== Preparation ==
The horse's ribs are removed, along with the meat, and hung for 5–7 hours to drain any remaining blood. The intestines are removed and thoroughly washed, and then brined for 1–2 hours. The meat from the ribs is salted, seasoned with pepper and garlic and left tied in a cloth for 2–3 hours. Then, the intestines are filled with the meat and the two ends are tied. After this preparation, the qazı can either be smoked at 50–60 °C for 12–18 hours, or dried outdoors for a week in a place exposed to direct sun and wind.

Before serving, the qazı is boiled in water for two hours. The cooked qazı is then sliced into one centimetre-thick pieces and served with onion and seasonal vegetables.

== Serving ==
Qazı is often eaten cold, sometimes sliced and served as an appetizer. In Uzbekistan it is often served with plov, and in Kazakhstan can be added to beshbarmak.

In mountainous regions, qazı may be made with venison.

== See also ==
- Sundae
- Beshbarmak
- Sujuk
- Qarta
- Shyrtan/Sharttan (Chuvash: Шӑрттан, ru:Ширтан) - a ball-shaped sausage made from stomach, similar to Sujuk and Haggis
- Makhan (sausage) (ru:Махан (колбаса))
- Khaan (sausage) (ru:Хаан (блюдо)) - a pre-Islamic blood sausage of Turkic peoples, nowadays made only by the Sakha people, as blood sausages are prohibited in Islam.
- Tultyrma (Bashkir: Тултырма, ru:Тултырма) - a sausage made from heart, liver, and lungs
- Bashkir cuisine
- Kazakh cuisine
- Kyrgyz cuisine
- Tatar cuisine
- List of sausage dishes
