= Kazakh cuisine =

Culinary traditions of Kazakhstan

The cuisine of Kazakhstan, also known as Kazakhstani cuisine, encompasses all traditional and modern cuisines of Kazakhstan. The dominant cuisine is the traditional food of the ethnic Kazakhs, who make up about 70% of the country's population. It is focused on mutton and horse meat, as well as various milk products. For hundreds of years, Kazakhs were predominantly herders who raised fat-tailed sheep, Bactrian camels, and horses, relying on these animals for transportation, clothing, and food. The cooking techniques and major ingredients have been strongly influenced by the nation's nomadic way of life. For example, most cooking techniques are aimed at long-term preservation of food. There is a large practice of salting and drying meat so that it will last, and there is a preference for sour milk, as it is easier to save in a nomadic lifestyle.

Meat in various forms has always been the primary ingredient of Kazakh cuisine, and traditional Kazakh cooking is based on boiling. Horse and mutton are the most popular forms of meat and are most often served in large uncut pieces which have been boiled. Kazakhs cared especially for horses which they intended to slaughter—keeping them separate from other animals and feeding them so much that they often became so fat they had difficulty moving.

The other inhabitants of Kazakhstan have enriched the country's culinary diversity with their own gastronomic traditions, most notably Russians in Kazakhstan (c. 15% of the Kazakhstani population). Cultural interactions have opened up the Central Asian land to dishes from around the world.

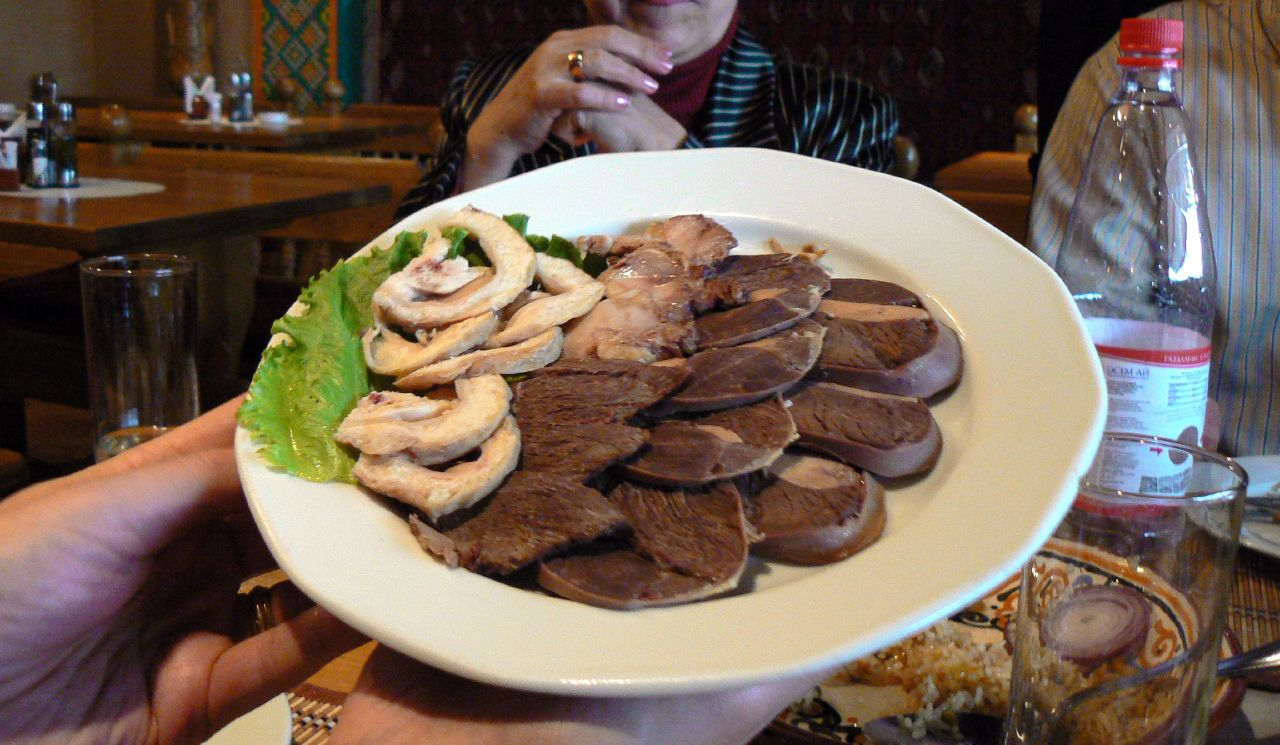
A platter of horse meat served traditionally as an appetizer

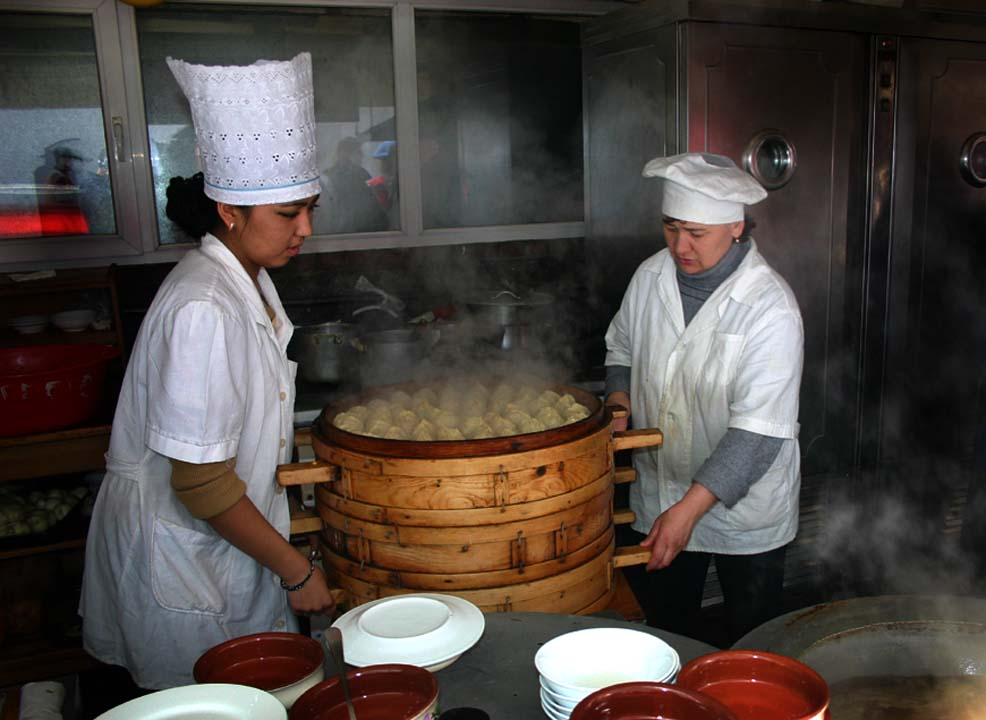
Preparation of a meal in Kazakhstan

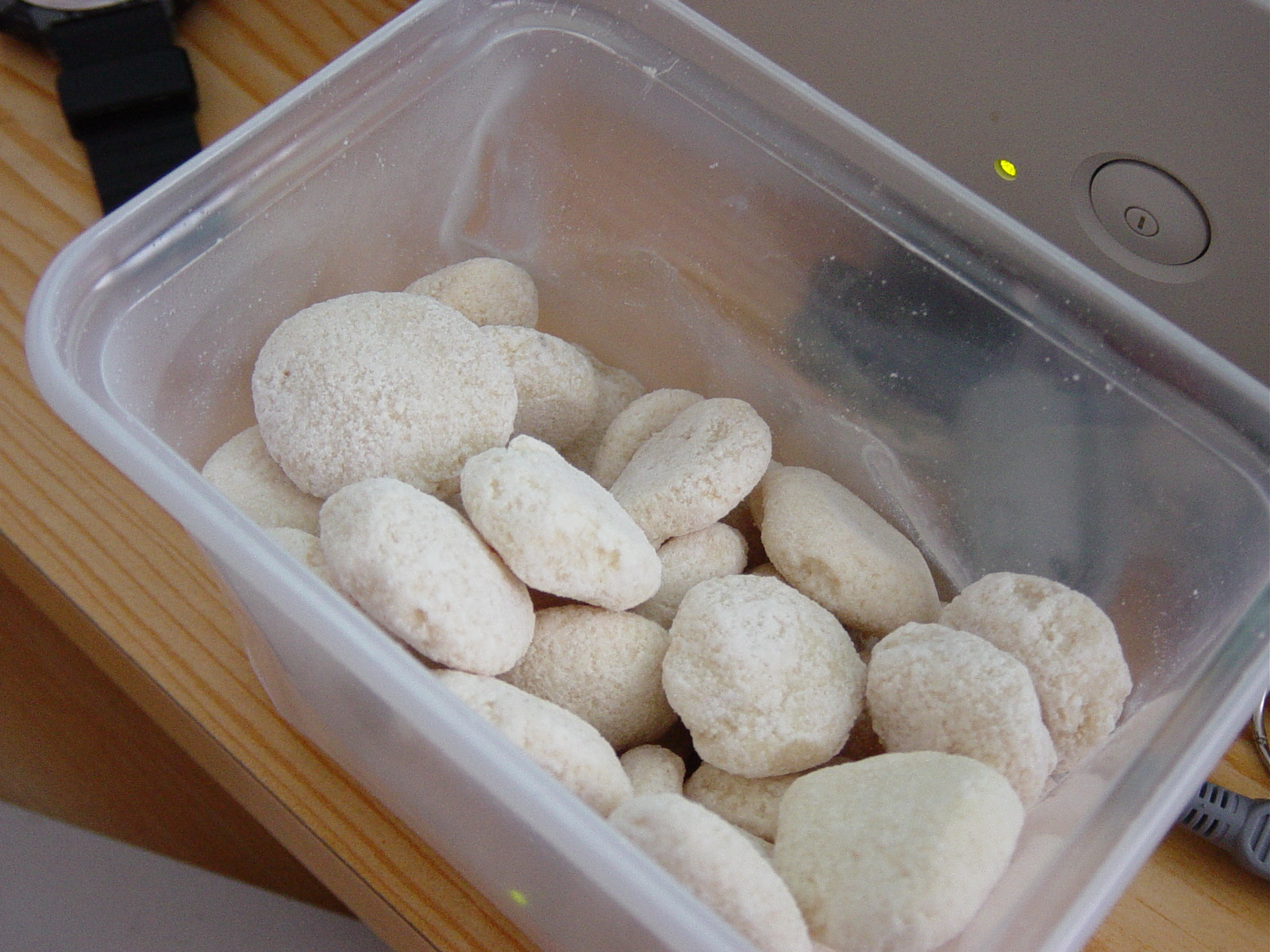
Qurt

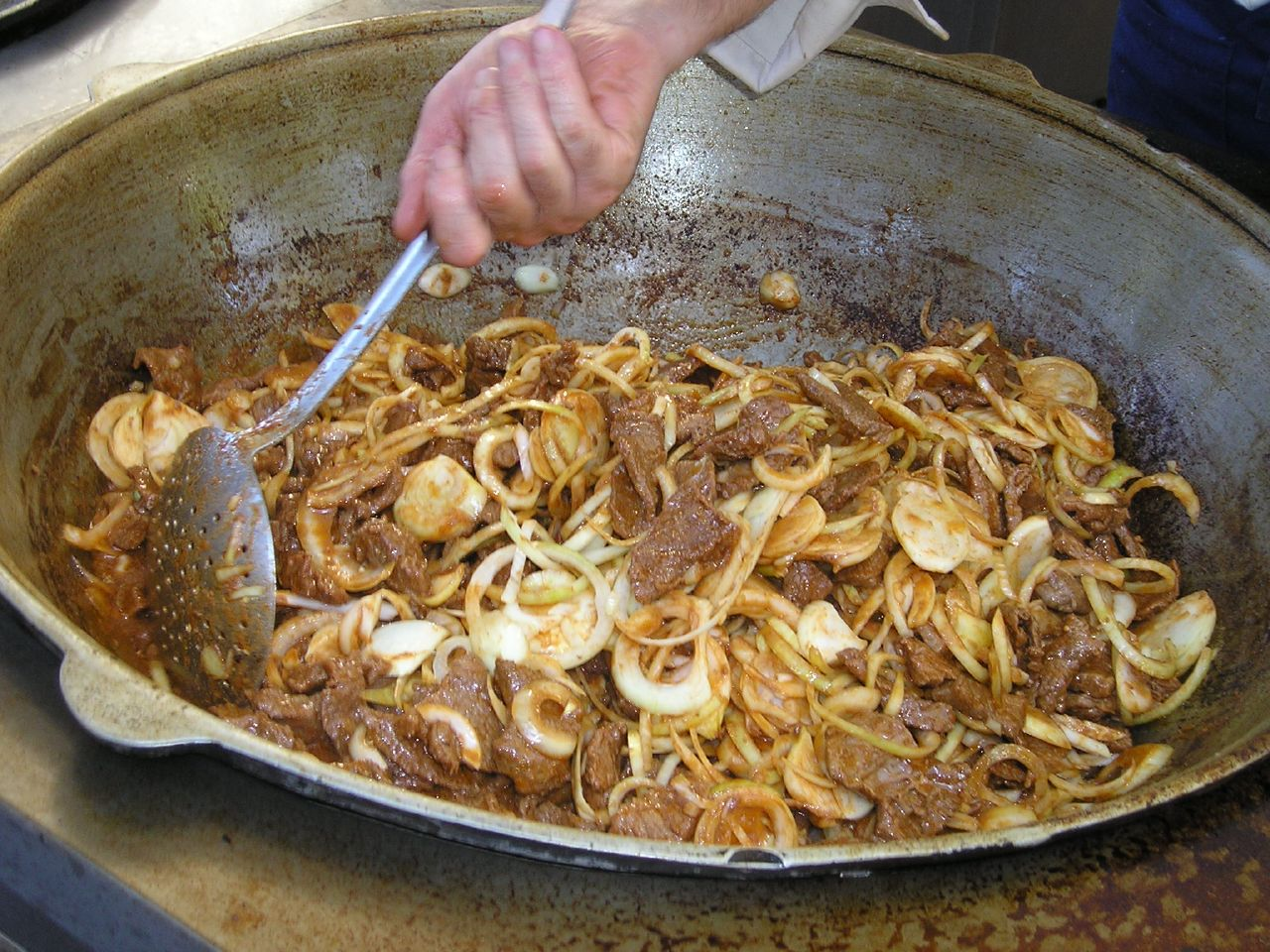
Quwyrdaq

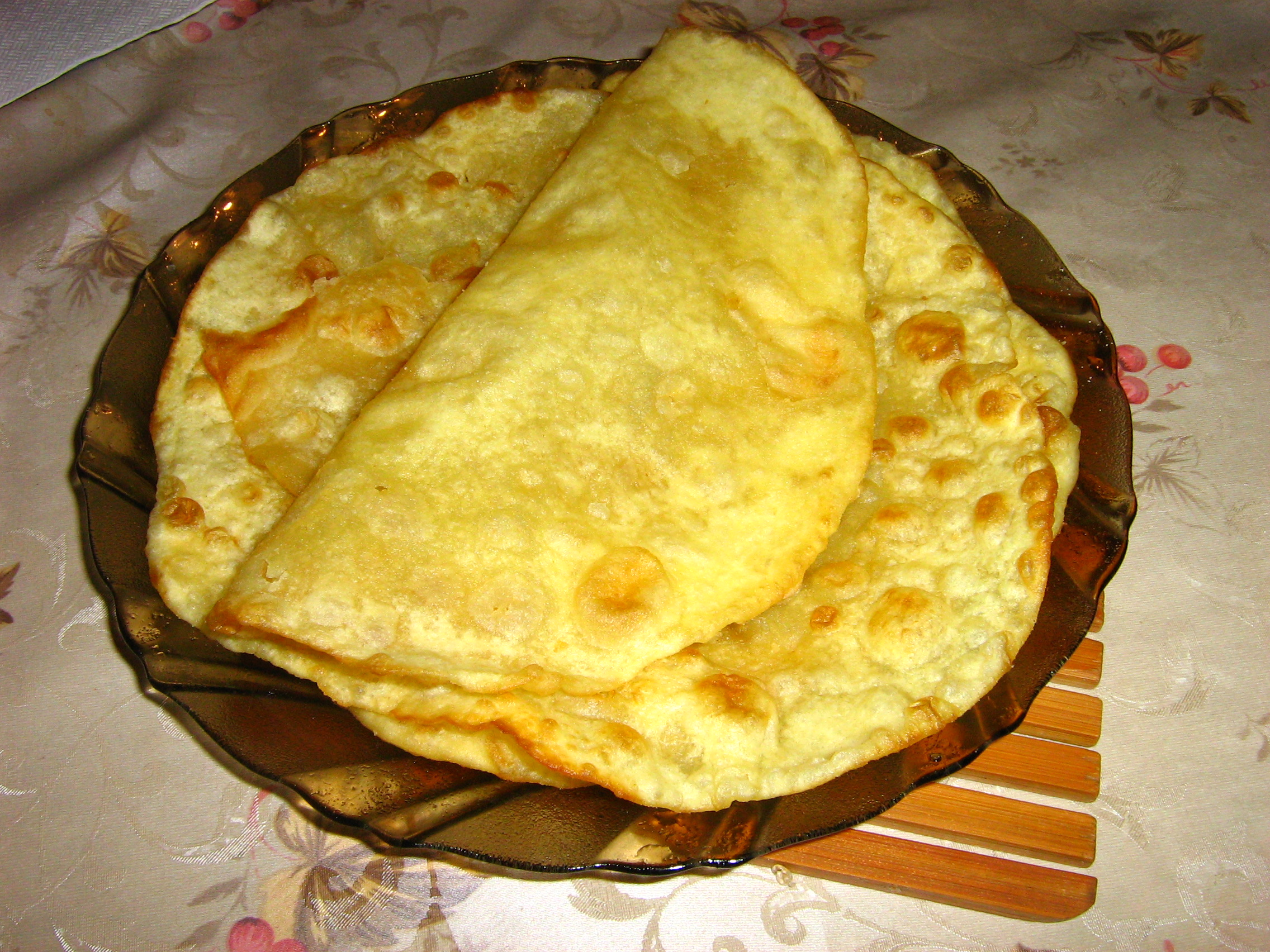
Shelpek

== Common and traditional dishes ==
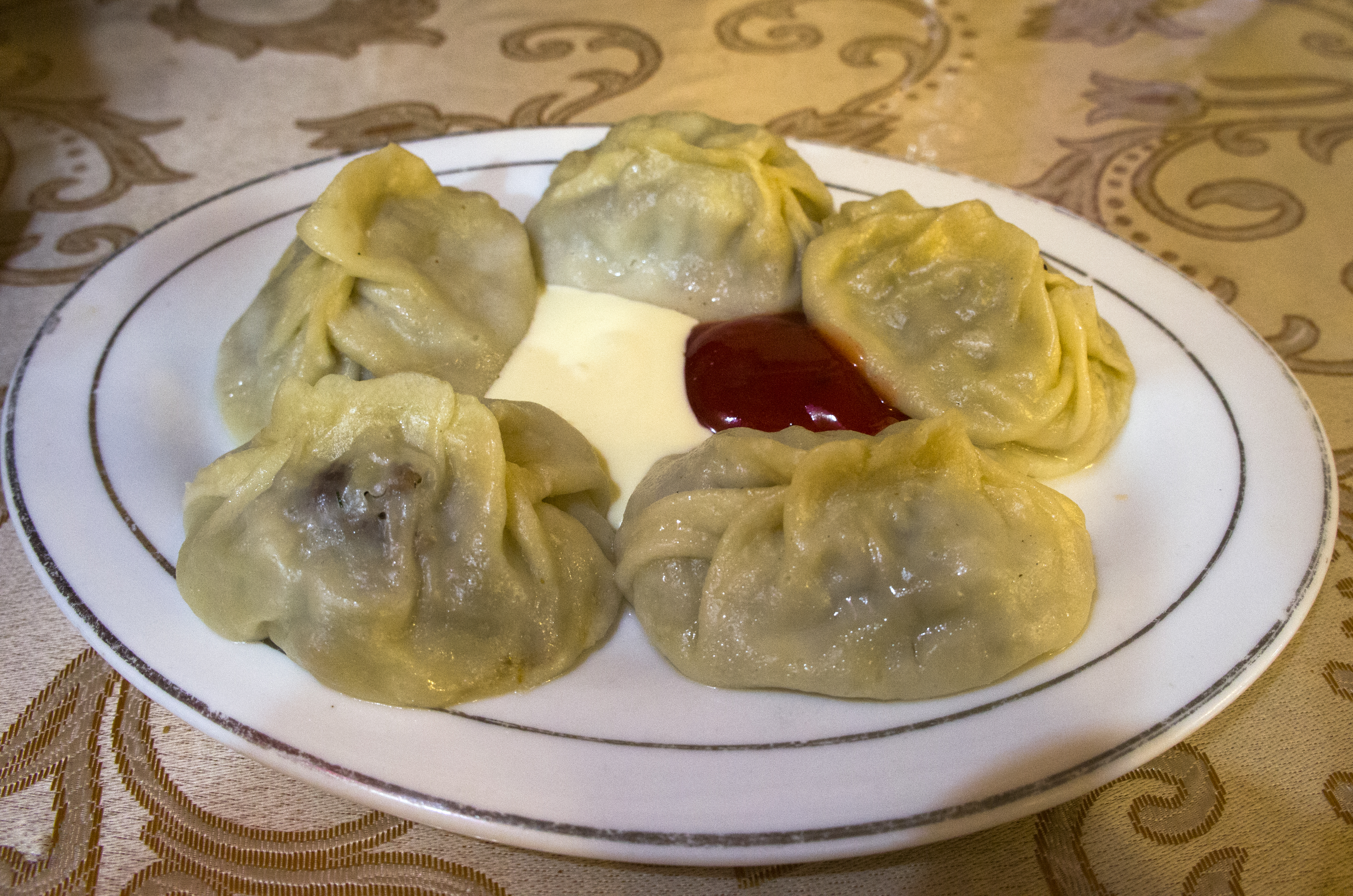
Mänti (dumpling)

=== Meat dishes ===
The majority of Kazakh cuisine is tört tülik mal (төрт түлiк мал) – four kinds of cattle (i.e. four kinds of meat): horses, camels, cows, and sheep. Horse and camel meat are the two main types of festive meats, with horse being the main and camel being not as common for festivities (as camels in Kazakhstan are not as common as horses). Sheep and cow meat are more common meats and are eaten more in everyday life.

Etqamyr (ет) or besbarmaq (бесбармақ), a dish consisting of boiled horse or mutton meat, is the most popular Kazakh dish and the national dish of Kazakhstan. It is also called "five fingers" because of the way it is eaten. However there are ongoing debates that this name is incorrect and emerged after the arrival of Russian settlers. The chunks of boiled meat are cut and served by the host in order of the guests’ importance. Besbarmaq is usually eaten with thinly cut dough boiled in a broth, and a meat broth called sorpa (сорпа), and is traditionally served in Kazakh bowls called kese (кесе).Each region has its own way of preparing it across the country.Quwyrdaq (қуырдақ) is another Kazakh national dish.

Other popular meat dishes are qazı (қазы), a horse meat sausage that only the wealthy could afford, traditionally served with qarta, shuzhyq (шұжық) (horse meat sausages; quwyrdaq, a dish made from roasted horse, sheep, or cow offal, with the heart, liver, kidneys, and other organs diced and served with onions and peppers; and various horse delicacies, such as zhal (жал) (smoked lard from a horse's neck) and zhaya (жая) (salted and smoked meat from a horse's hip and hind leg).

Another popular dish is palaw (палау), which is made from meat fried with carrots, onions or garlic, then cooked with rice that is added on top, also known as crackler, is melted fat in a large bowl with sugar, eaten by dipping it with bread and is often served with tea. Qiymay (қимай) is a sausage made during fall and winter slaughtering and is made by stuffing intestines with pieces of ground meat, fat, blood, garlic, salt, and black pepper. Zhawbüyrek (жаубүйрек), also known as käwap (кәуап), is popular among hunters and travelers and is a dish in which small pieces of meat are roasted over a fire. Ülpershek (үлпершек) is a dish made from the heart, aorta, and fat of a horse, prepared in a kettle, and is often shared between sisters-in-law as a sign of unity.

Qazı (қазы) is a sausage eaten in the spring when a cow has a new calf; it is a giant sausage sometimes served with rice or qurt. Miypalaw (мипалау) is a dish made from sheep's brain, made by putting the brain in a wooden bowl, adding marrow, pieces of meat, salted fat in broth, and garlic; this dish is then often served to honored guests. Aqshelek (ақшелек) is a large camel bone distributed to children after slaughtering and cooking meat from a camel.

Qiymay is another kind of sausage eaten later in the year after it has aged; if smoked it will last a long time, an important consideration in Kazakh cooking. Zhal is the layer of fat under a horse's mane and is served only to special and honored guests, as it is such a rare commodity. Zhaya is the rump of a horse, probably served boiled. Aq sorpa (ақ сорпа) is a white broth made in the fall, and is a special meal for rich men. Quyryq-bawyr (құйрық-бауыр) is a meal which used to be served to kinsmen at wedding parties. It is made from boiled meat, sliced thinly, with sour milk and salted broth added.

Sür et (сүр ет) is salted horse meat smoked over elm, juniper or meadowsweet.

Laghman is another popular dish made from meat, vegetables and noodles.

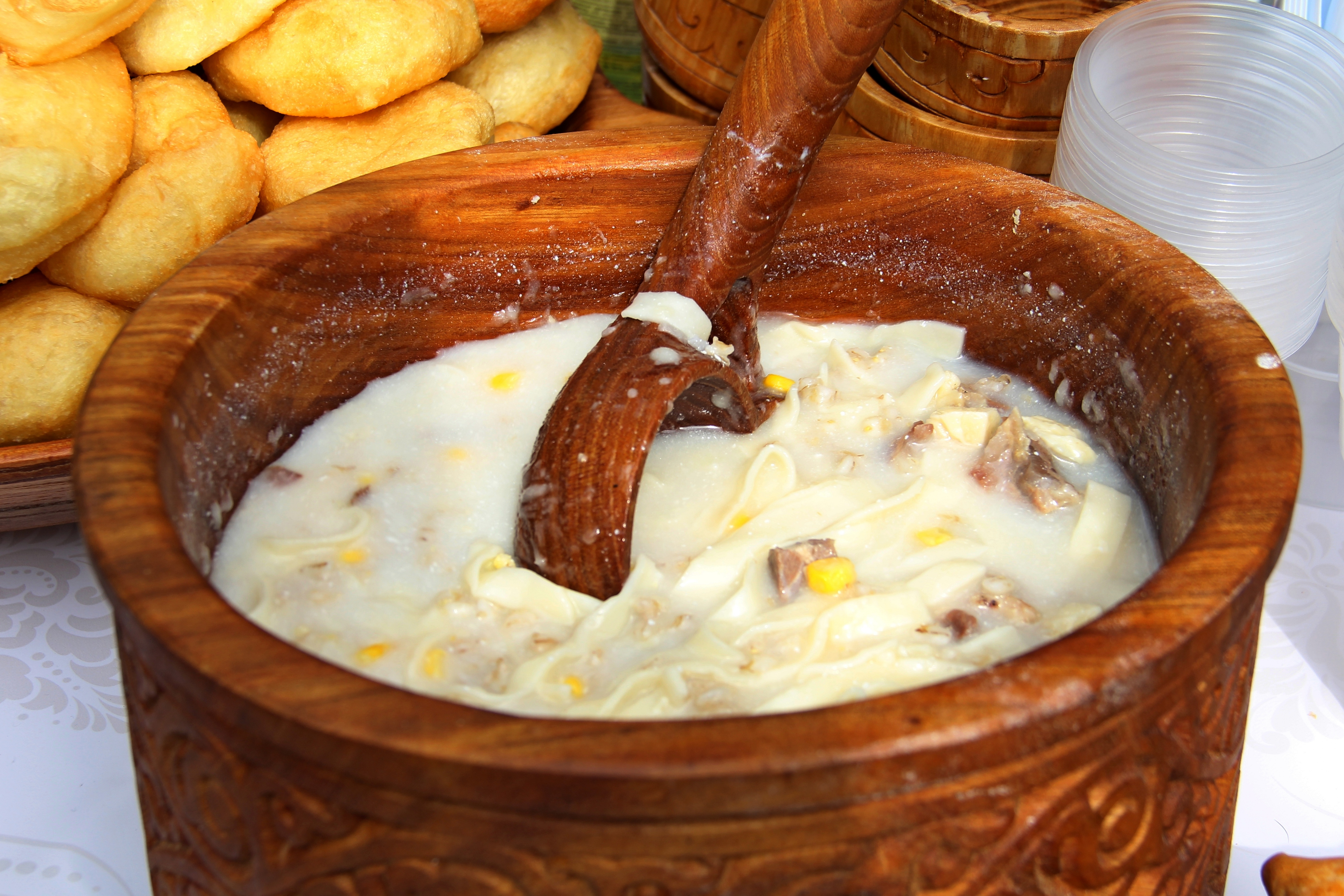
Nauryz kozhe

Nauryz kozhe (наурыз көже) is a dish made on Persian New year that is widely celebrated in Central Asian countries. It's a savory soup that contains 7 different ingredients that vary across regions. They usually are: meat (horse meat), fat, water, milk, cereals, and salt. These ingredients are believed to represent wealth and happiness for the upcoming year.

=== Milk dishes ===
Traditional milk products include süt (сүт), which is boiled milk. Qaymaq (қаймақ) is sour cream made from boiled milk, and is sometimes served with tea. Sary may (сары май) is butter made from old milk, often in a leather bag. Qurt is prepared by pressing thick sour cream, and is dried until white and salty. Irimshik (ірімшік) is a cottage cheese processed in the spring, made from boiled, unskimmed milk and added sour cream.

Süzbe (сүзбе) and qatyq (қатық) are strained and thickened sour milk. Qoryqtyq (қорықтық) is a herdsman's food, which is thickened milk made out on the steppe. Tosap (тосап) is made from the scum on the sides of a metal pot and is used as medicine. Ayran (айран) is sour milk used in winter and summer. shubat (шұбат) and qymyz (қымыз) (fermented camel's milk and fermented mare's milk) are seen as good for one’s health and are consumed often.

=== Breads ===
The introduction of flour to Kazakh cuisine brought about dishes such as bawyrsaq (бауырсақ), shelpek (шелпек), mänti (мәнті), and nan (нан). Bawyrsaq is made by frying dough balls, and shelpek is a flat cake made in a similar fashion. Mänti, a very popular Kazakh dish, is a spiced mixture of ground lamb (or beef) spiced with black pepper, enclosed in a dough wrapper. Mänti are cooked in a multi-level steamer and served topped with butter, sour cream, or onion sauce. Nan is a type of traditional bread made in the tandyr oven, popular in cities along the Silk Road. Zheti Nan (жеті нан) or zheti shelpek (жеті шелпек) are seven pieces of fried round sourdough bread. It is often made on Thursdays to commemorate ancestors, each representing a single ancestor. Kazakhs believe that the smell of fried bread feeds these ancestors. Quymaq (құймақ), qattama (қаттама), and oyma (ойма) are flat puff cakes fried in oil, then covered in cream. Samsa (самса) is a pastry with a savory meaty filling inside. Another sweet is shek-shek (шек-шек).

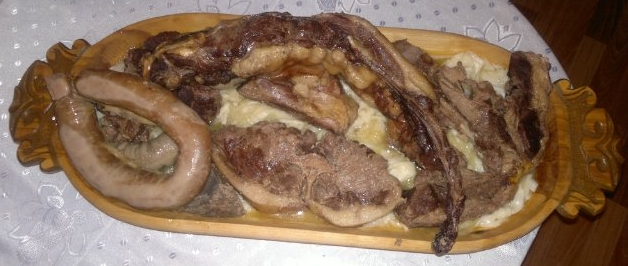
Besbarmaq, Kazakhstan's most popular dish

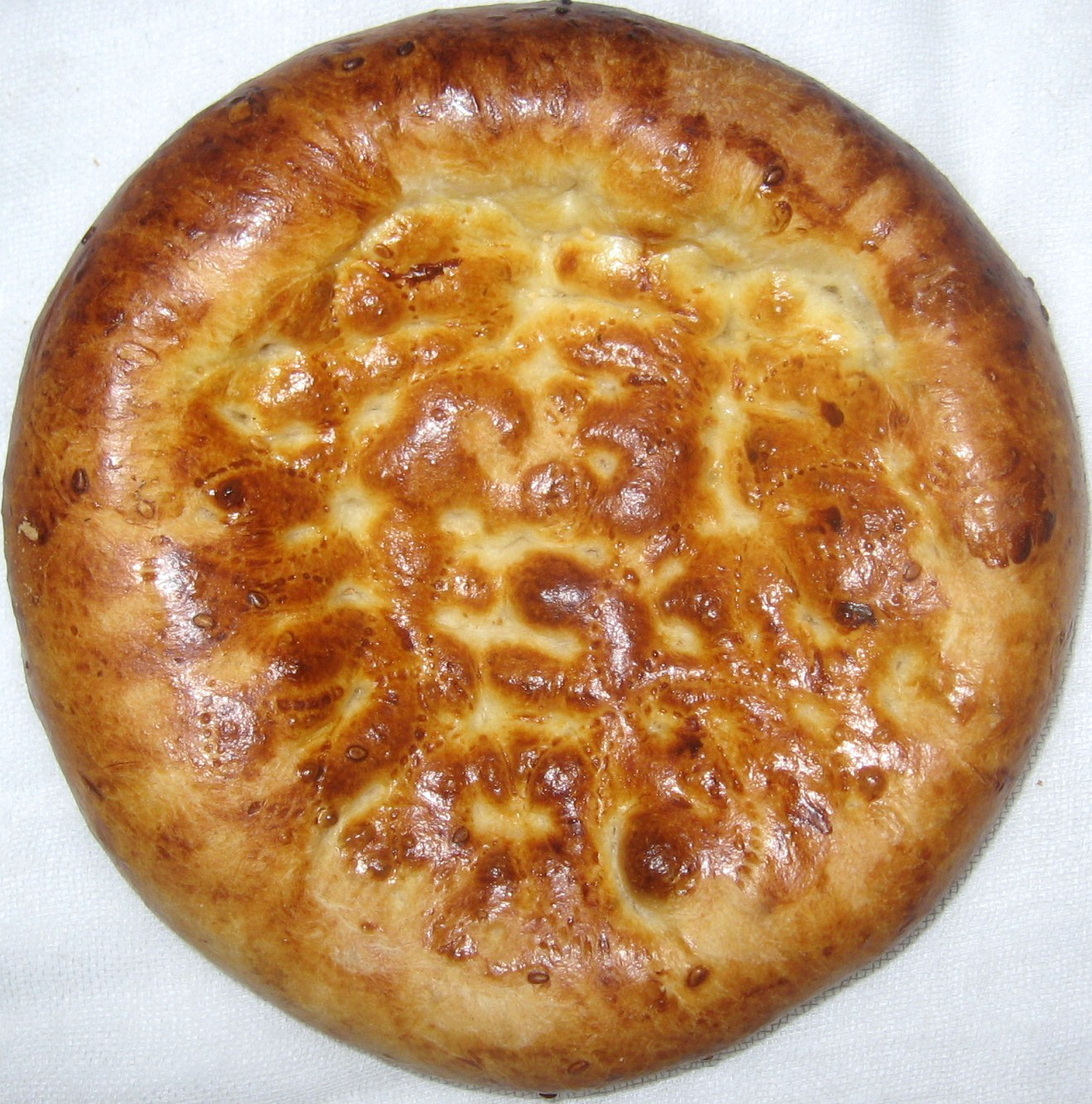
Tandyr nan

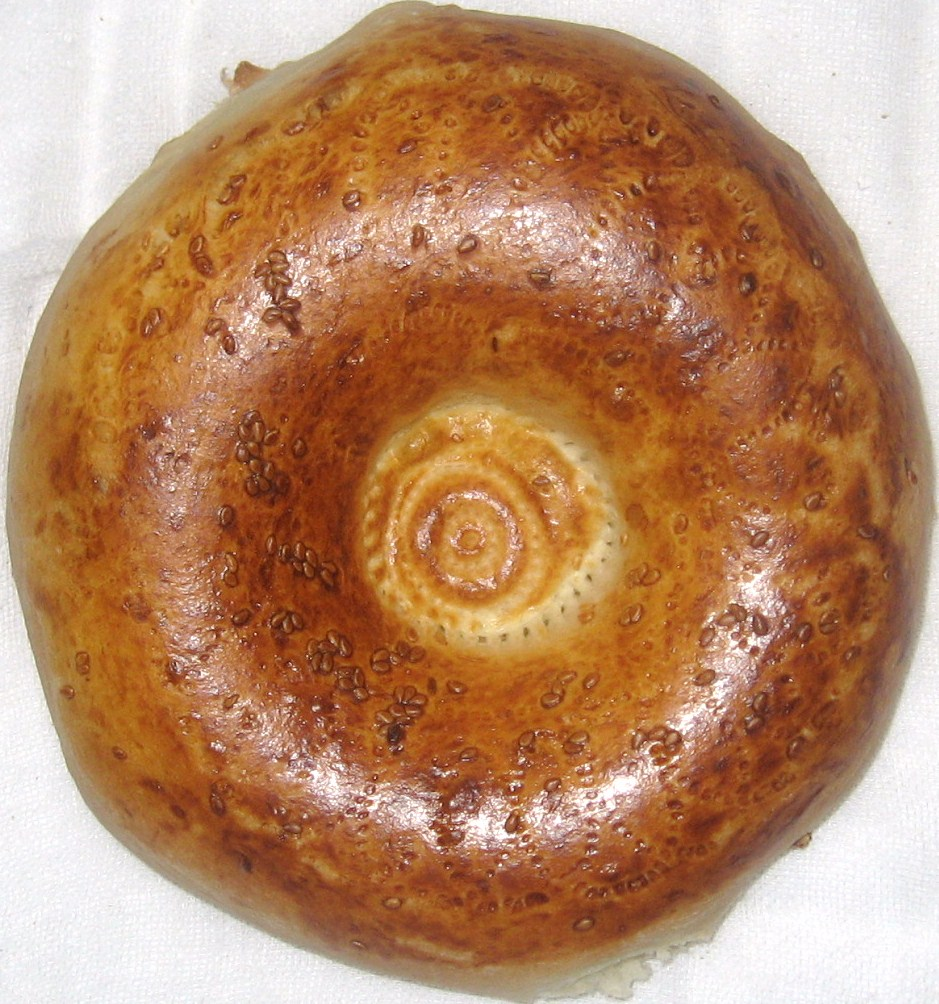
Toqash

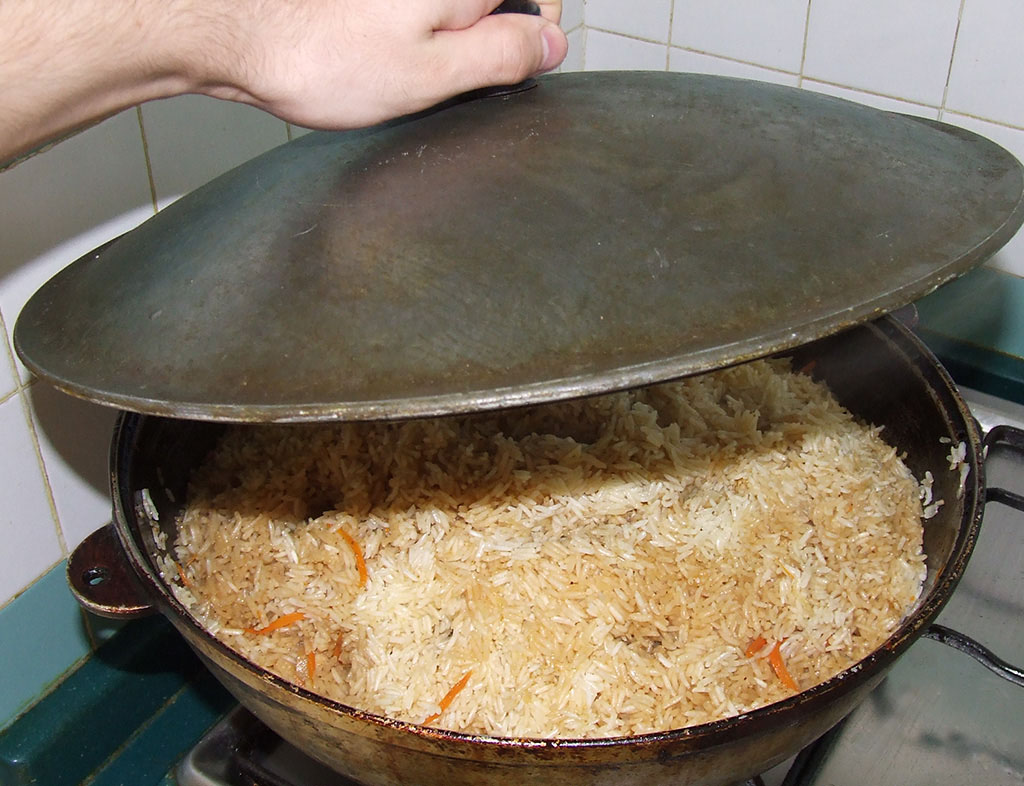
Pilaf (palaw) being prepared in a qazan

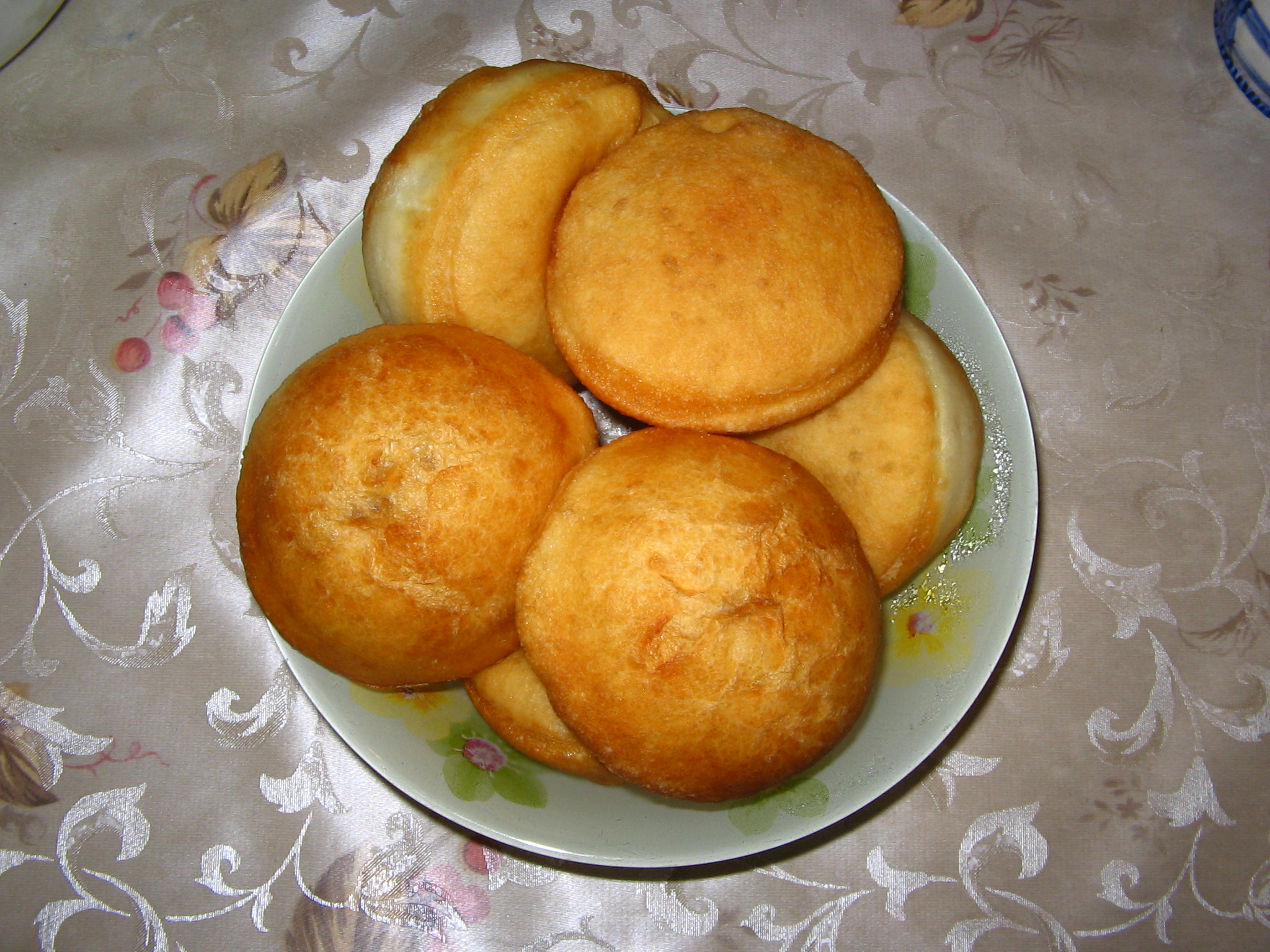
Bawyrsaqs

== Beverages ==
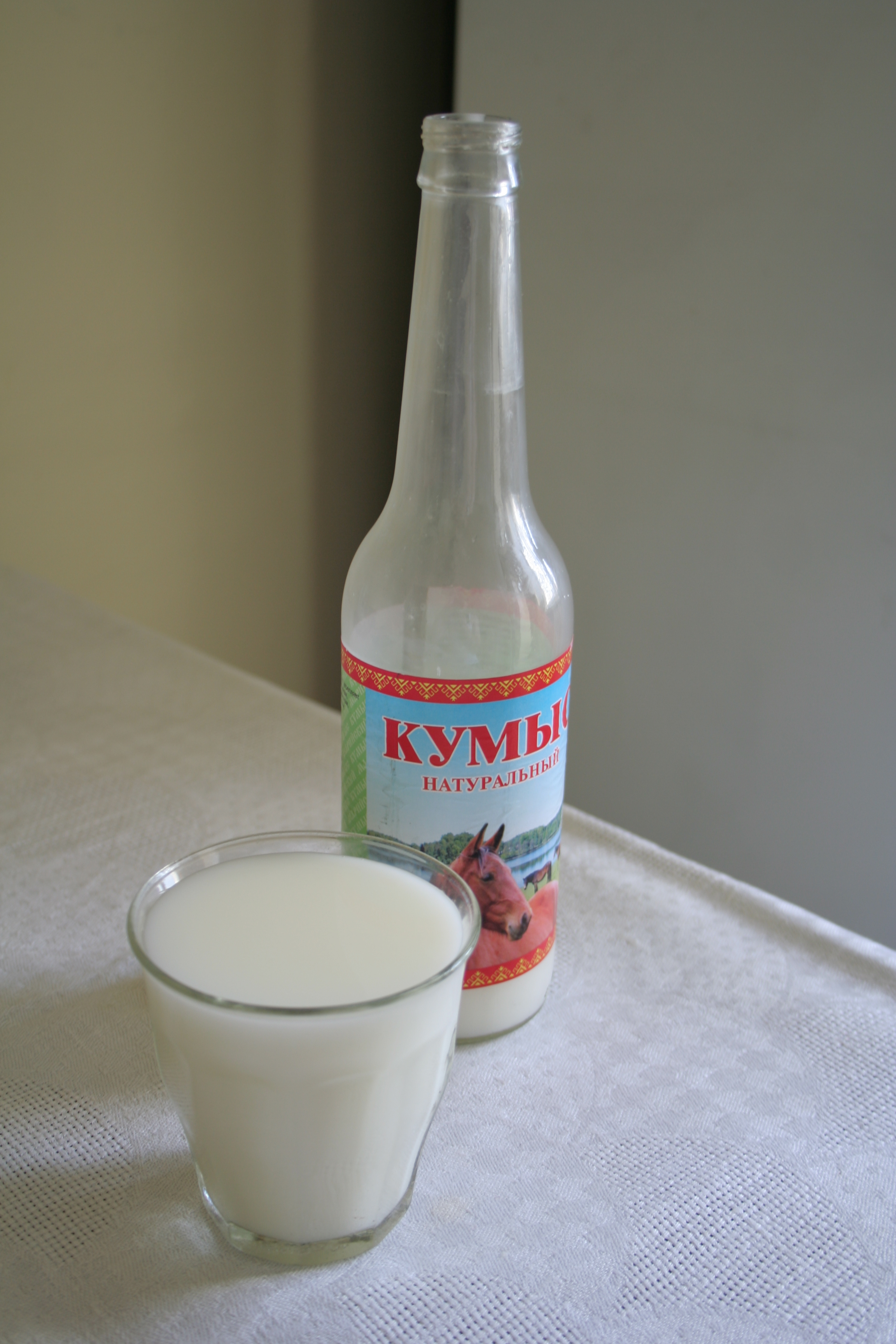
A bottle and glass of qymyz

The traditional drinks are fermented mare's milk (qymyz), camel's milk (shubat), cow's milk (ayran), and sheep's milk, as well as their products qaymaq (sour cream), qatyq or ayran (buttermilk), qurt (which is made from dried cheese and whey rolled into balls), and irimshik (dried sour milk product similar to qurt, but not rolled into balls). These drinks were traditionally consumed with the main course. However, meals often end with qymyz and then tea. In the summer, shubat is one of the staple drinks of the Adai Kazakhs. Black tea was introduced from China after the foundation of the Silk Way and was traditionally consumed with sweets after the main course. Nowadays it has virtually replaced other traditional drinks and every meal is accompanied with tea. The tea ceremony, taking its roots from the nomads many centuries ago, is a special dastarqan (дастарқан) ritual in Kazakhstan. Kazakh tea is typically strong black tea with milk or cream.

== Desserts ==
The most common traditional sweets are bawyrsaq, shelpek, shek-shek (also known by the Tatar name chack-chack), and zhent. Zhent is a dessert that doesn't require baking and is made with millet, honey, sugar, and butter. They are easy to prepare in nomadic conditions - in a cauldron, and in the modern day are traditionally prepared for festive celebrations. Balkaimak (балқаймақ) (honey sour cream) is made with boiled sour cream and honey.

== Influential cuisines ==
In addition to traditional nomadic practices and the internal development of Kazakh food and cuisine, other countries and ethnic groups have had a large influence on the food and food culture of Kazakhstan. These ethnic groups included Russians, Tatars, Ukrainians, Uzbeks, Germans, Uyghurs, Koreans, and many more. Although traditional Kazakh cuisine is based on meat and milk products, more recently, vegetables, fish and seafood, baked dishes, and sweets have been added to Kazakh cuisine.

== Practice and ritual ==
In nomadic cookery, the amount of equipment is minimal because it must be transported from location to location to follow the grazing herds. In addition, there are no luxuries such as electricity or running water. The iron kazan is the most indispensable piece of cookware—it is used for cooking pilaf, soups, and even bread. If the kazan is shallow, it can be turned over to cook flatbread on the back. Many parts of the sheep and goat are used for holding milk products or for making cheese.

The host of the meal cuts the meat themself and gives the best cuts to more honored people or to children. This meat is most often eaten with thin boiled pieces of pastry. Sometimes the most honored guest at a meal will receive a cooked head of a ram, which is passed around in ceremonial or ritual practice. A guest is always given the place of honor and a special welcome in Kazakh practice.

Kazakhs traditionally eat at a low table called a dastarqan. Kazakhs also maintain a tradition of using beautiful dishware when possible. Qymyz is served in wide bowls decorated with silver or in painted cups, and meat is often served on wide platters. Tea is steeped in ornate teapots and served in lovely cups. Unusual ingredients such as dried melon and small intestines were regularly woven into interesting patterns, and the bread featured floral designs painted with berry juice. Bigger and deeper bowls are used to serve dairy products, and small wooden basins are used for making dough. Each family has their own wooden spoons, which are cared for and transported in felt and wooden cases, showing their importance in food culture in Kazakhstan.

Kazakhs, like other Central Asians, have special rules of the "tea ceremony". Traditionally, tea is not to be poured to the brim of the cup (called kese). The less tea is poured, the more respect is given to the guest. The traditional explanation is that if the host pours too much tea, it is a signal that he wants the guest to leave sooner. The less tea poured, the more the host has to pour it over and over again, so that the guest always has hot tea, which shows care for the guest. Different regions have different understandings of the amount of "tea with respect".
