= Koktal (dish) =

- Type: Fish dish
- Course: Main course
- Place of origin: Kazakhstan
- Region or state: Zhetysu, Lake Balkhash, Ili River basin
- Associated cuisine: Kazakh
- Created by: Traditional (unknown)
- Invented: Ancient origin
- Cooking time
- Serving temperature: Hot
- Main ingredients: Large freshwater fish (carp, silver carp, or catfish)
- Ingredients generally used: Onion, tomato, bell pepper, potato, garlic, mayonnaise, salt, black pepper, fresh willow twigs
- Food energy (per 100 g serving): 150 kcal
Nutritional value
(per 100 g serving)
- Protein: 16.5 g g
- Fat: 7.8 g g
- Carbohydrate: 2.1 g g
- Similar dishes: Hot-smoked fish

Koktal (Kazakh: Көктал) is a traditional Kazakh fish dish made from large freshwater fish using a distinctive hot-smoking method. It is highly popular in the southeastern regions of Kazakhstan, particularly around Lake Balkhash, the Ili River, and the Zhetysu region. The name of the dish literally translates to "green willow" (from the Kazakh words kök for green/fresh and tal for willow), referencing the fresh willow twigs traditionally used during the smoking process to impart a unique aroma and flavor.

== History and Etymology ==
The origins of koktal are deeply intertwined with the lifestyle of Kazakh tribes who inhabited the Zhetysu region and the Balkhash-Alakol basin. While the nomadic diet heavily leaned towards meat, the populations living near rivers and lakes developed highly advanced fishing practices.

The traditional technique involved placing fresh willow twigs onto the coals. As the twigs smoldered beneath the fish, they released a fragrant smoke that neutralized any muddy river odor and infused the meat with a delicate, signature taste.

== Preparation Technology ==
The authentic preparation of koktal follows a precise and unique set of steps:

- Fish Selection: Large fish weighing at least 3 to 5 kilograms (typically carp or catfish) are selected to ensure the meat remains juicy during the long smoking process.
- The Butterfly Cut: Unlike standard fish preparation, the scales are completely left intact to serve as a natural protective shield against the heat. The fish is sliced open along the spine (backbone) rather than the belly and flattened out like an open book. All seasonings and toppings are applied strictly to the exposed inner flesh.
- Vegetable Layering: The flattened fish is seasoned with salt and spices, then completely covered with neatly layered slices of onions, tomatoes, bell peppers, and thin potatoes. In modern adaptations, a layer of mayonnaise or sour cream is applied to lock in moisture.
- Smoking Process: The prepared fish is placed inside a large, custom-built metal smoking box called a koktalyzh. Sprigs of applewood, pearwood, or fresh willow are placed at the bottom of the box. The airtight box is sealed and placed over an open fire, allowing the fish to bake and smoke simultaneously in its own juices for 40 to 60 minutes.

== Cultural Significance ==
Today, koktal is far more than a simple home-cooked meal; it has evolved into a prominent culinary brand and a cultural symbol of southeastern Kazakhstan. Gastronomic festivals and competitive koktal-cooking tournaments are held annually along the shores of Lake Balkhash and in the Almaty region, drawing tourists and culinary enthusiasts from across the country.

== See also ==
- Kazakh cuisine
- Smoked fish
- Asado (similar open-style cooking)
