= Qarta =

Central Asian dish

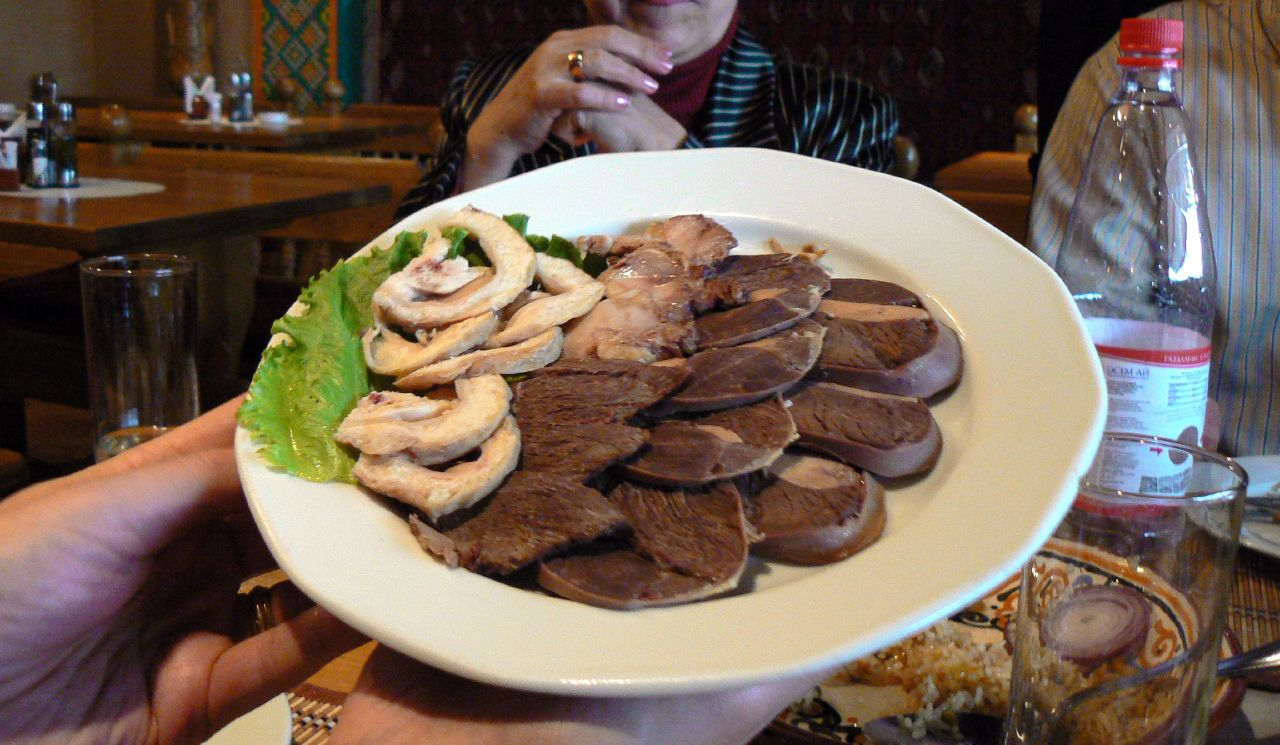
A platter of horse meat served traditionally as an appetizer (qarta and qazy on the left and right respectively)

Qarta is a Kazakh, Kyrgyz and Uzbek dish of boiled and pan-fried horse rectum, taken from the final few inches of digestive tract before the muscular part of the anus. It is served without sauce or spices. The section includes "strong tissue on the outside" and "gradations of tender mucous membrane tissue and fatty mass on the inside" and includes a layering of soft and hard tissues that dense and varied with fat, according to a reviewer from Vice.com. It is prepared in various ways to clean it thoroughly and remove any unpleasant taste due to the provenance of the tissue. One method is to turn it inside out and wash it thoroughly. It can also be smoked for 24 hours and then (sometimes) dried for an additional 48 hours. Or it can be boiled for a couple of hours. It is then sliced into rounds, simmered in a "meat bouillon" and seasoned with salt, green pepper, and dill. It is often served with qazy.

Qarta is high in amino acids and unsaturated fat, and low in cholesterol content.

== See also ==
- List of smoked foods
