= Beshbarmak =

Central Asian dish of meat with noodles

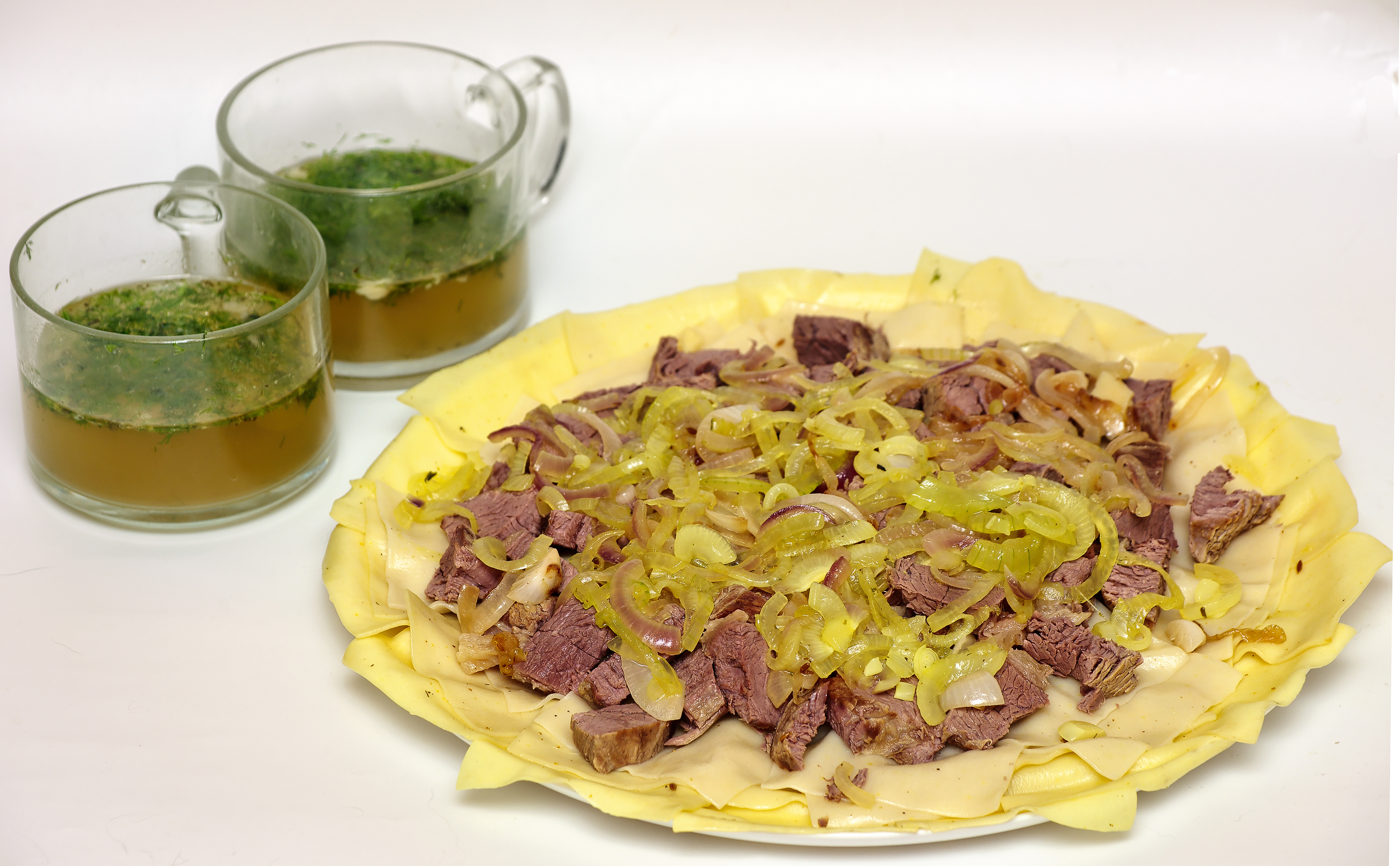
Beef beshbarmak

Beshbarmak (Kyrgyz: бешбармак, romanized: beşbarmak; Bashkir: бишбармаҡ, romanized: bişbarmaq; lit. 'five fingers') is a meat, noodles, and onion broth dish in Central Asian cuisine. It is also known as naryn in Xinjiang, Uzbekistan, Kyrgyzstan and Kazakhstan, as turama in Karakalpakstan and Dagestan, as dograma in Turkmenistan, and as bişbarmaq or qullama in Bashkortostan and Tatarstan.

Beshbarmak, which means "five fingers" in Turkic languages, refers to the traditional practice of eating the dish with one's hands. This name is believed to have emerged later, especially after Russian cultural and ethnographic observations of the nomadic peoples of Central Asia. Another name for beshbarmak in Kyrgyz is tuuralgan et, which means crumbled or chopped meat.

Beshbarmak is usually made from finely chopped boiled meat, mixed with dough (typically egg noodles) and chyk, an onion sauce. It is typically served on large communal platters, shared between several people, after shorpo, a first course of mutton broth served in bowls called kese. It is also followed by a broth called ak-serke (shorpo mixed with kymyz or ayran), which is thought to help with settling the stomach. Festive beshbarmak can be cooked together with qazı and chuchuk.

== Historical background ==
The cuisine of Central Asia developed within the constraints of a nomadic life, when people were completely reliant on their animals. This is reflected in Central Asian dishes, which are rich in meat and dairy products.

The construction of beshbarmak as a national dish dates to the Soviet literature having inherited the nomadic and "settler" dichotomy from the Russian Empire. Two books were foundational in the formation of the national cuisines of Central Asian peoples: Kniga o vkusnoi i zdorovoi pishche (The Book of Tasty and Healthy Food) and Natsional’nyie kukhni nashikh narodov (The Ethnic Cuisines of our Peoples) by William Pokhlyobkin.

== The serving ritual ==
The serving of beshbarmak is steeped in ritual. If an animal, such as a sheep, was slaughtered in a guest's honor, then the host serves ustukan, different cuts of meat, to different people, depending on their gender, age, and rank in the social structure. As a sign of respect, the oldest people and honored guests are always presented the prime cuts of the meat.

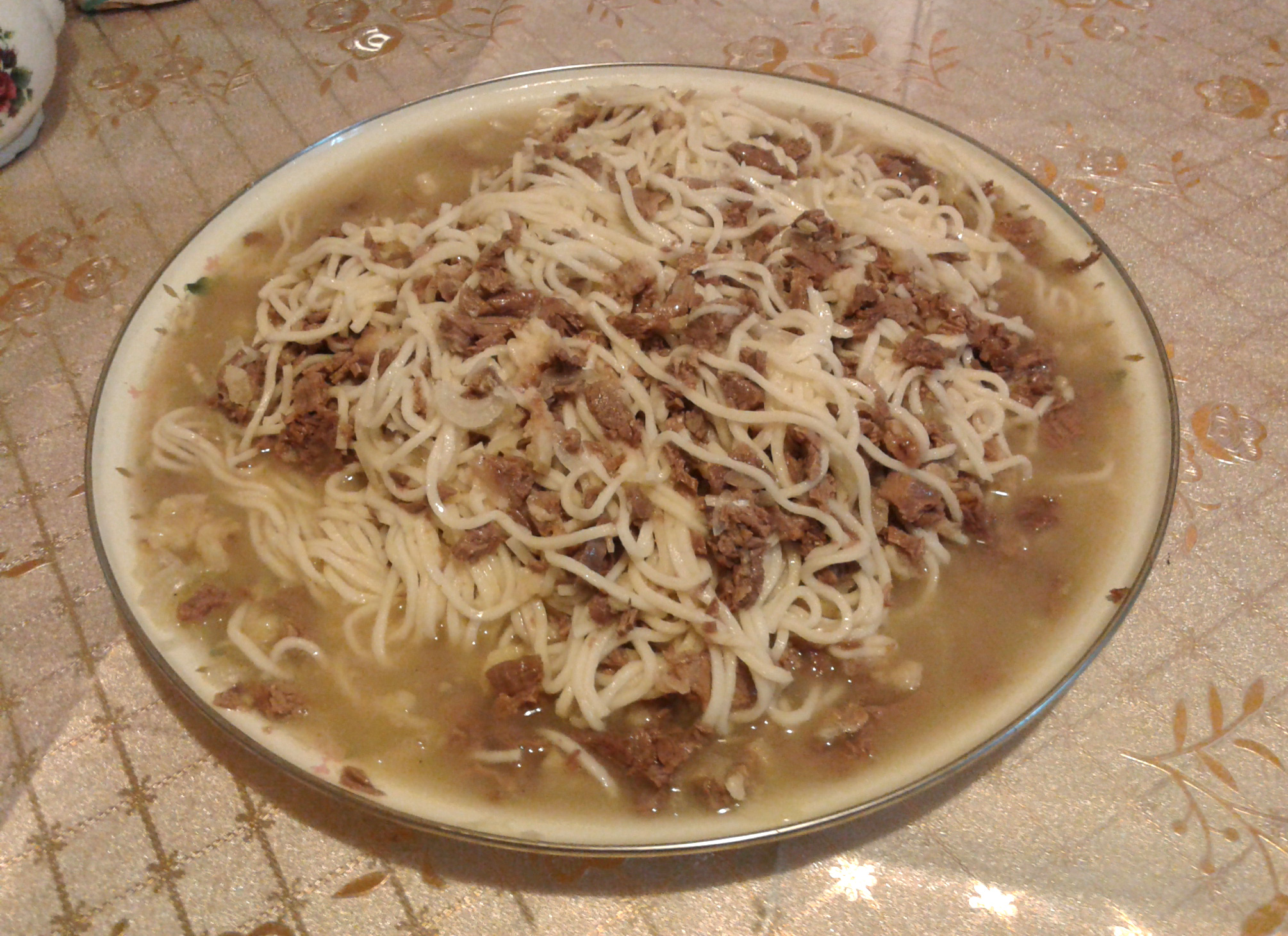
Beshbarmak

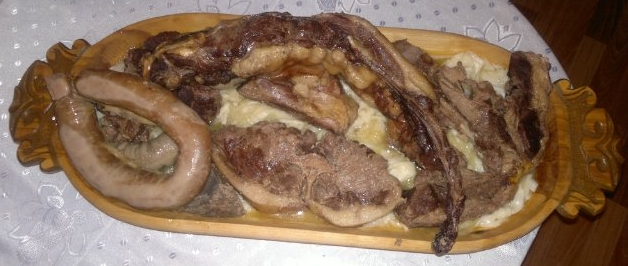
Festive serving of beshbarmak in Kazakhstan as a plate of meat and sausages

On special occasions, the guest of honor, the eldest male, or the youngest male, receives the bash, the head of the animal, and cuts pieces from it to distribute to other people. The oldest men or aksakal receives the jambash, the thigh bone. The oldest and most respected women receive the kuiruk or kuymulchak, the tailbone. The legs and shoulders are presented to the younger adults, and the smaller bones are reserved for the daughter-in-law of the house. The omurtka, the spine, is given to the children.

Other ustukans include the joto jïlïk, tibia or shin bone, the kashka jïlïk, thigh or femur bone, the bone from rib to thigh called the karchiga, a rib without fat called the kara kabirga, the kar jïlïk or radius bone, dalii or shoulder blade, the toshi, breast or brisket, and the kung jïlïk, bone from the leg to the shoulder blade.

== Preparation ==
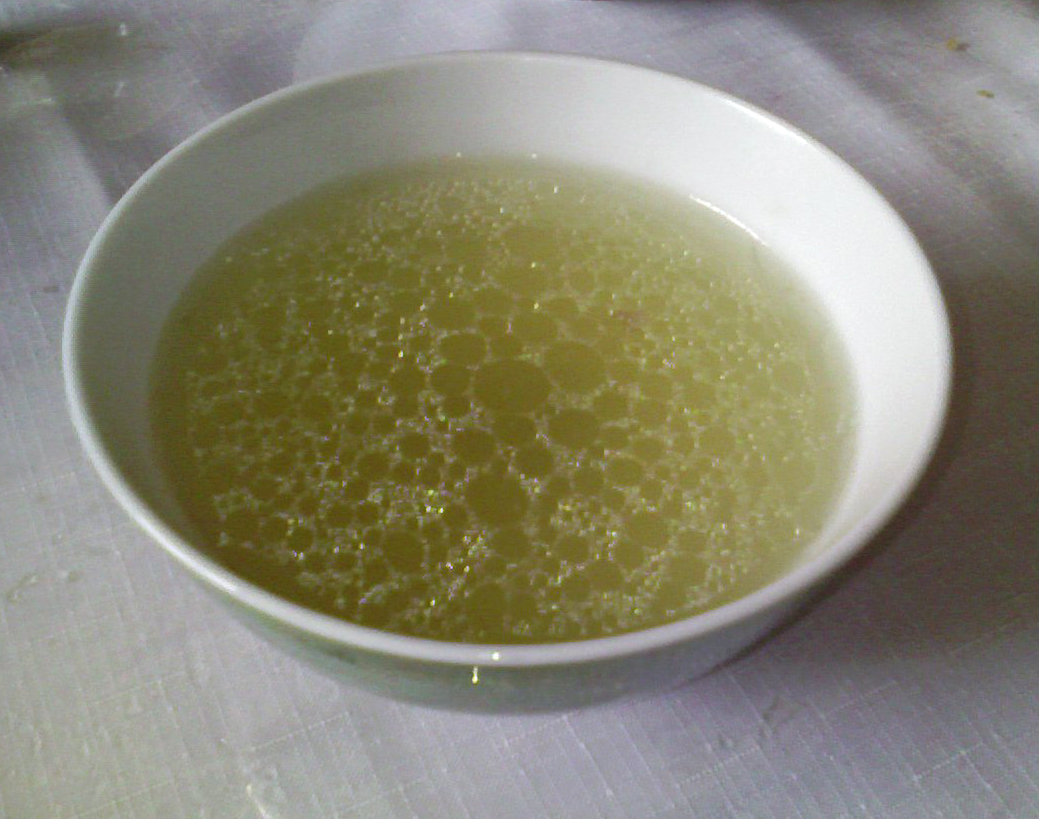
Shorpo, mutton broth served before beshbarmak

In the classic variant of beshbarmak, as it is now prepared in northern Kyrgyzstan (especially in the Naryn region), a sharp knife called a maki (Kyrgyz: маки) is required to thinly dice all the ingredients before they are put on the dastarkhan. The dish also requires a pot to boil the meat and noodles in, and a rolling pin to roll out the noodles.

Beshbarmak is prepared by first boiling a piece of meat, such as the rump of a horse, or a rack of lamb, or qazı or chuchuk horsemeat sausage. In warm seasons, beshbarmak is usually made with mutton.

The noodle dough is made from flour, water, eggs, and salt, and rested for 40 minutes. Then the dough is rolled out very thinly, and cut into noodles.
