= Piyāla =

Type of tea drinking bowl

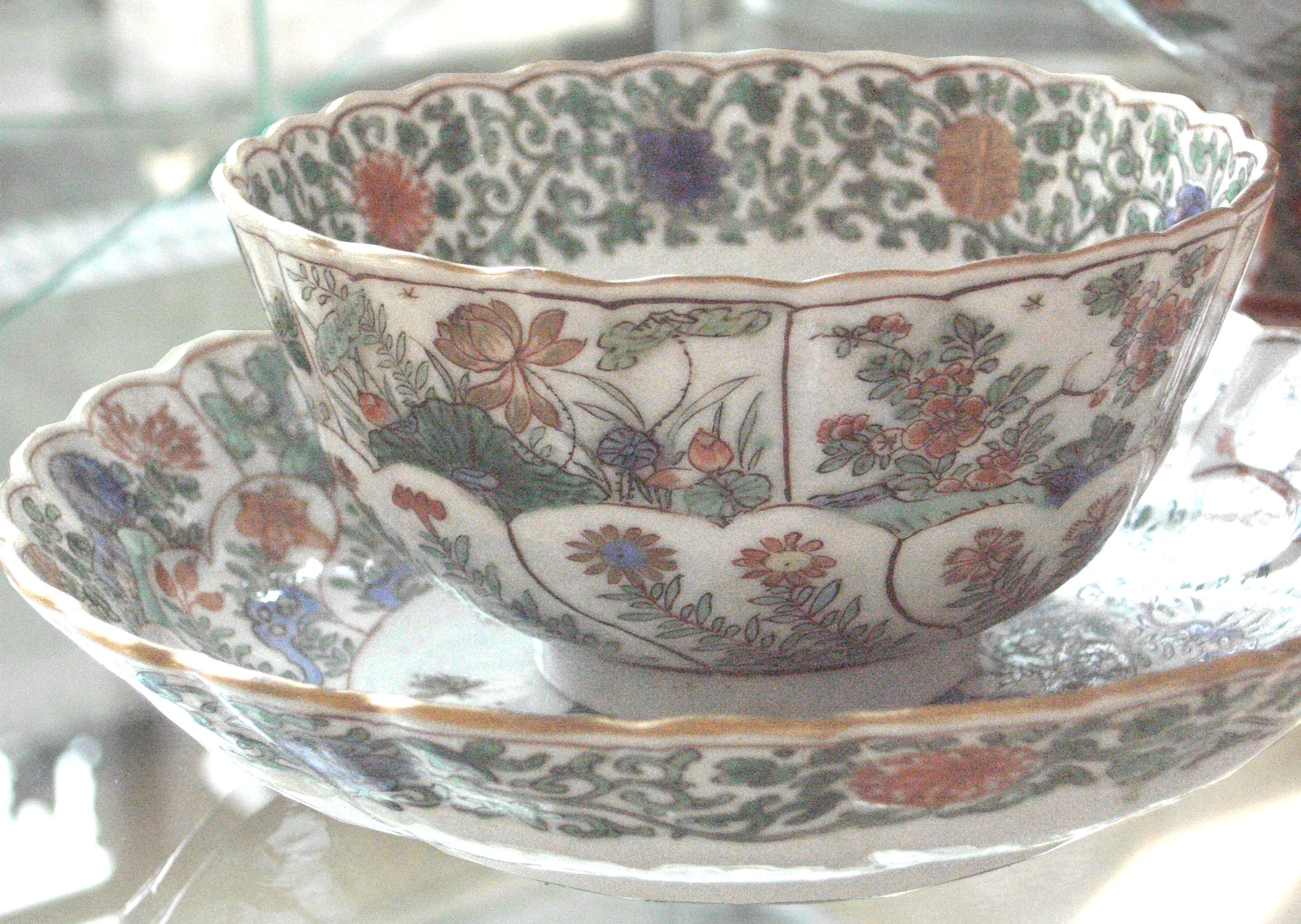
Chinese porcelain piyāla from the period of the Qing dynasty

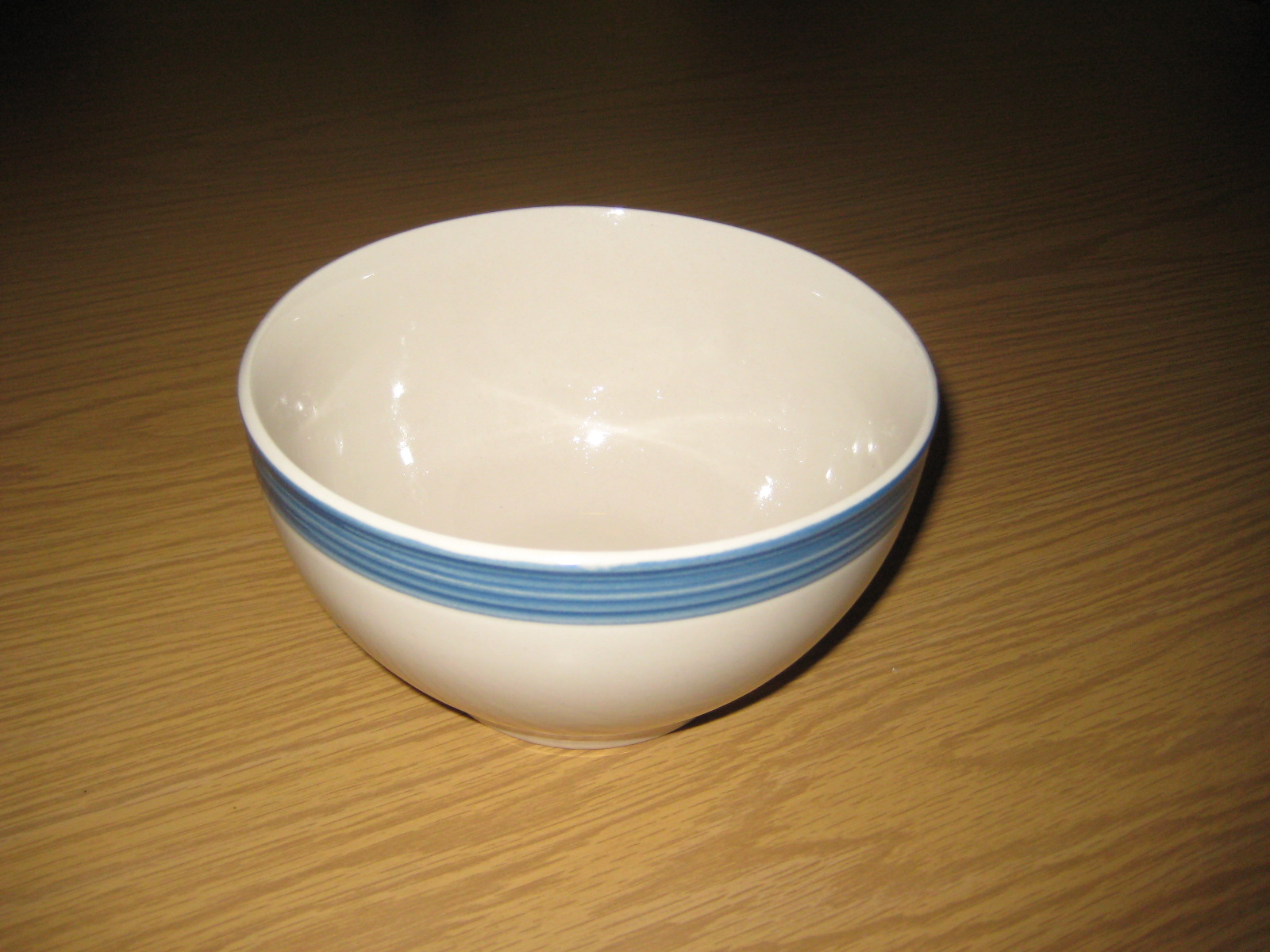
Simple ceramic piyāla

A piyāla (Persian: پیاله, Kurdish: پیاڵە, Urdu: پیال), also called piola, piyola (Uzbek: piyola, IPA: [pɨjɒlá]), piala (Russian: пиа́ла [pʲɪˈalə] or пиала́ [pʲɪɐˈla]), chini (Kyrgyz: чыны, Kazakh: шыны, Turkish: çini, from China) or kasa (Bashkir: каса, romanized: kasa, Tatar: касә, romanized: kasä) is a small ceramic bowl used throughout Central Asia for drinking tea. It is similar to the East Asian chawan. Piyālas may be used for other beverages too, such as kymyz, though traditionally a full-size bowl (called kese) is used for cold and hot beverages.

Lacking handles, piyālas stack readily, an important consideration amongst the nomadic peoples of Central Asia.
