= Dastarkhān =

Traditional space where food is eaten

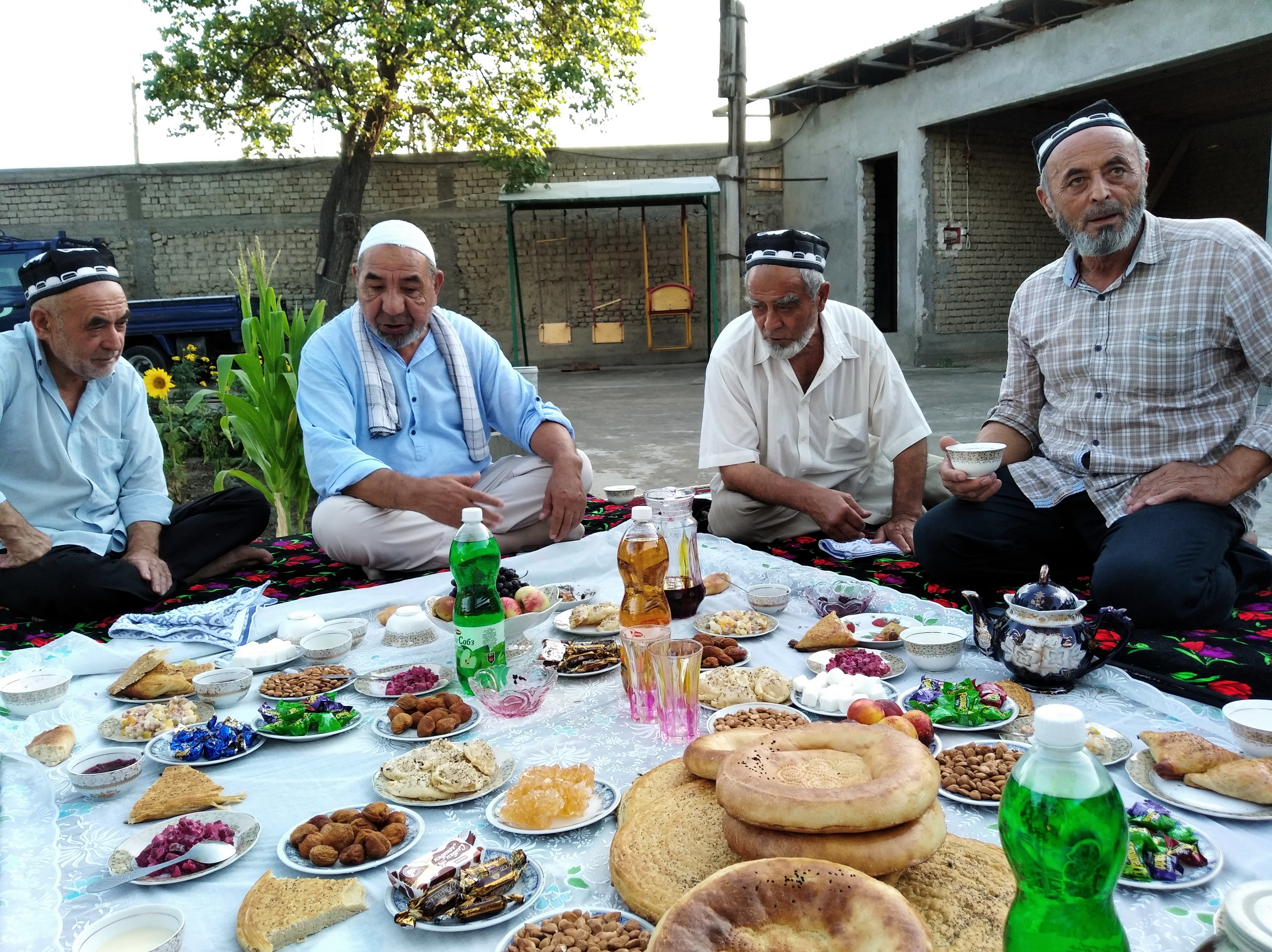
- Aksakals by dastarkhān
- Region or state: Central Asia and South Asia

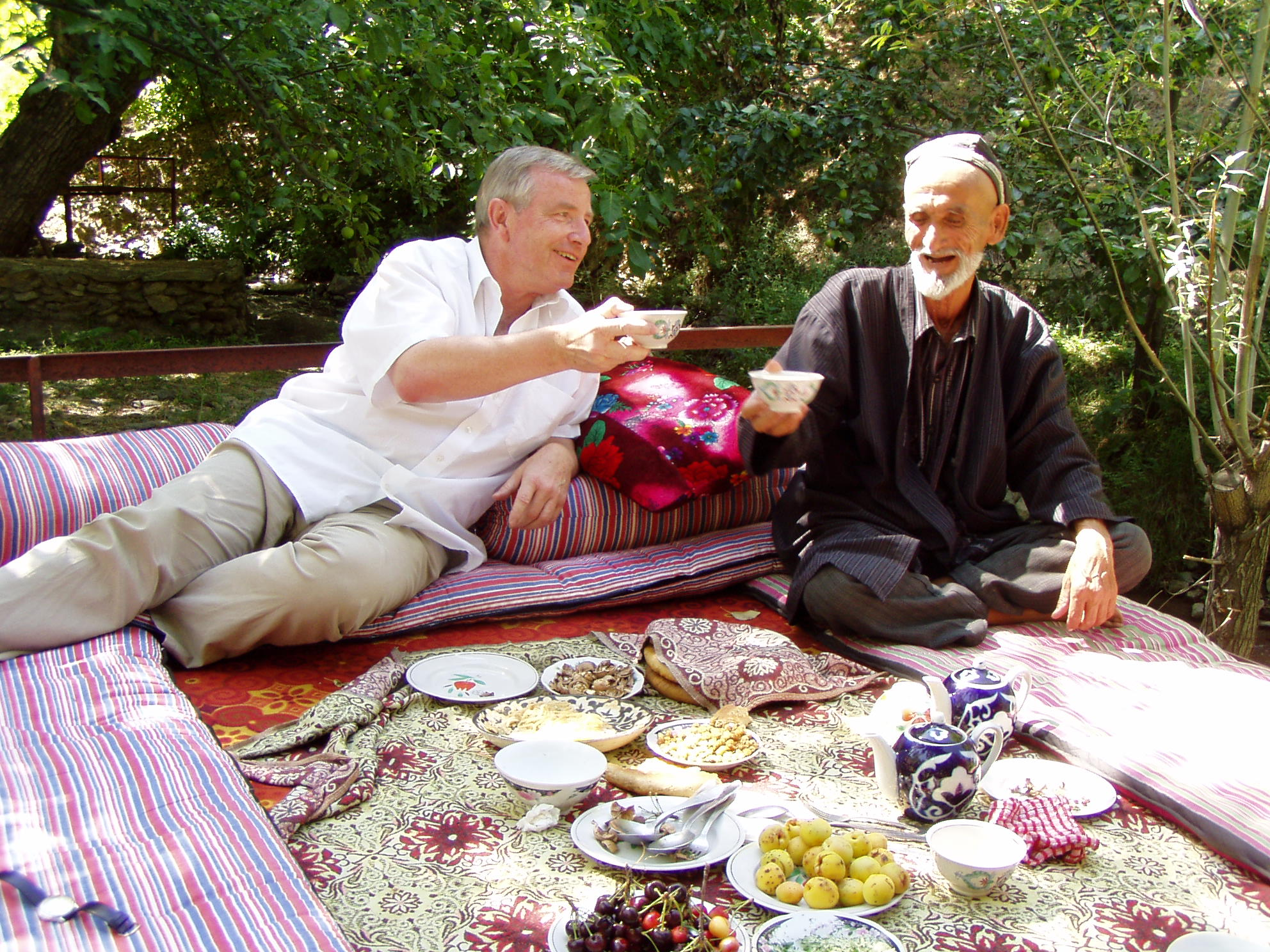
Dastarkhan on a platform

A dastarkhān (Note: Persian / Urdu / Balochi: دسترخوان, Tajik: дастархон, Bashkir: дастархан, romanized: dastarxan, Kyrgyz: дасторкон, Hindi: दस्तरख़्वान, romanized: dastarkhwan, Punjabi: ਦਸਤਰਖ਼ਾਨ, Gujarati: દસ્તરખ્વાન, Kazakh: дастарқан, Turkmen: dastarhan, Bengali: দস্তরখান, Uzbek: dasturxon, Nepali: दस्तरखान) or dastarkhwan is the term used across the Central Asia and South Asia that refers to the traditional dining space where food is eaten. The term is a word of Persian origin meaning the tablecloth which is spread on the ground, floor, or table as a sanitary surface for food.

The Mughal Indian cookbook Dastarkhwan-e-Awadh, which details the Awadhi cuisine of Lucknow, emphasized the importance of the dastarkhwan.
