= Kyrgyz cuisine =

Culinary traditions of Kyrgyzstan

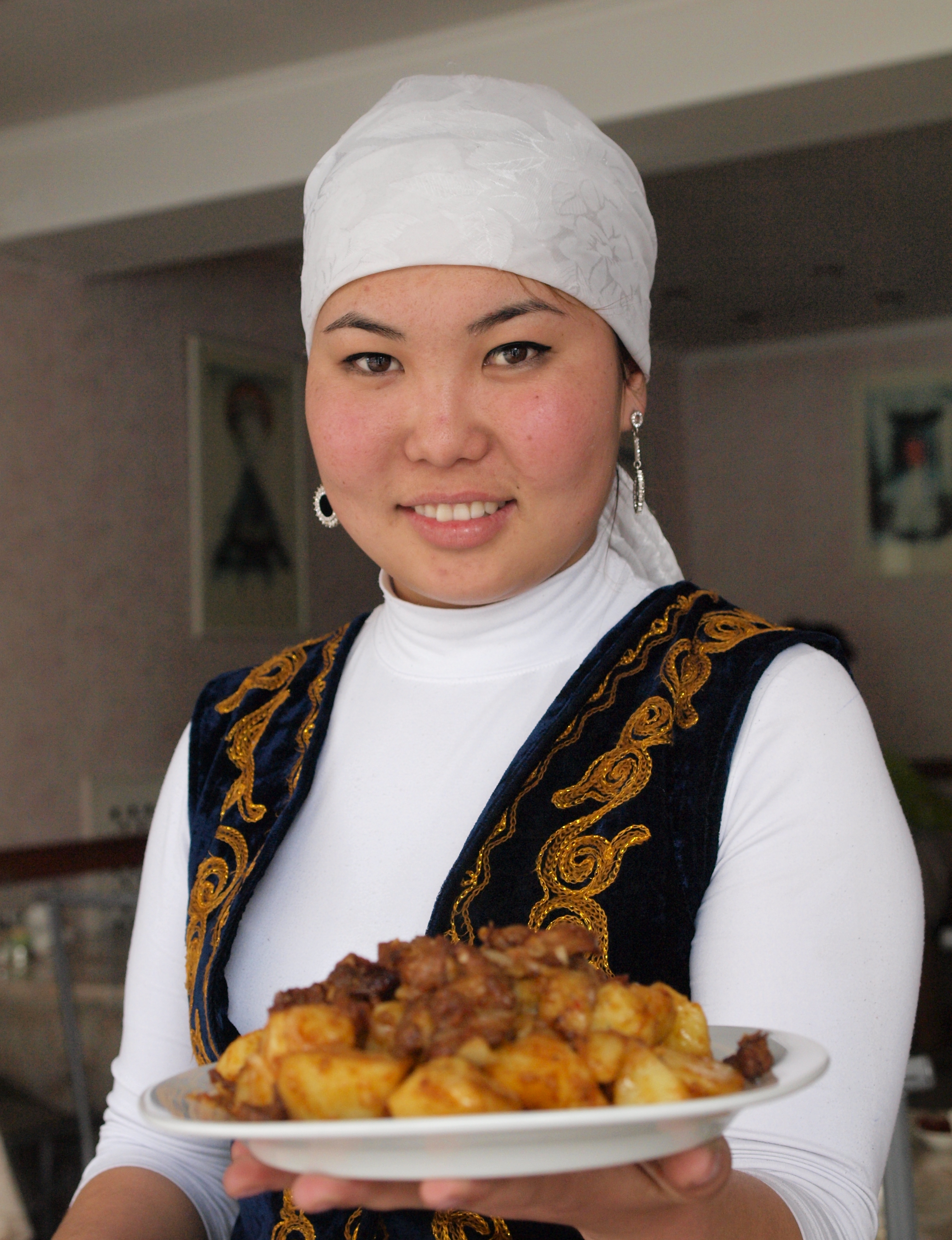
A Kyrgyz woman in national dress delivering a Kyrgyz dish in Bishkek.

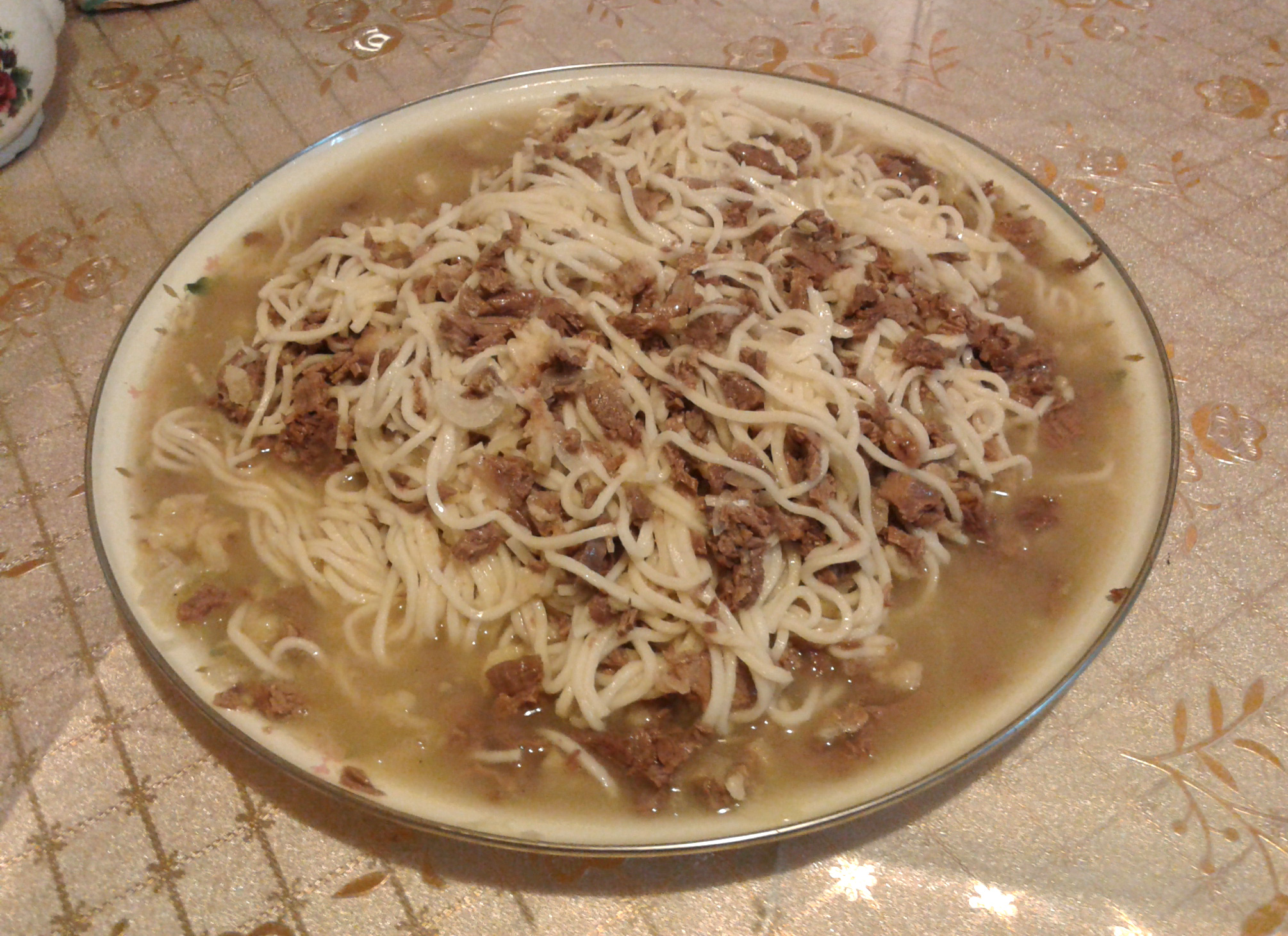
Beshbarmak

Kyrgyz cuisine is the cuisine of the Kyrgyz, who comprise a majority of the population of Kyrgyzstan. The cuisine is similar in many aspects to that of their neighbors.

Traditional Kyrgyz food revolves around mutton, beef and horse meat, as well as various dairy products. The preparation techniques and major ingredients have been strongly influenced by the nation's historically nomadic way of life. Thus, many cooking techniques are conducive to the long-term preservation of food. Mutton and beef are the favorite meats, although in modern times many Kyrgyz are unable to afford them regularly.

Kyrgyzstan is home to many nationalities and their various cuisines. In larger cities, such as Bishkek, Osh, Jalal-Abad, and Karakol, various national and international cuisines can be found. Non-Kyrgyz cuisines that are particularly common and popular in Kyrgyzstan include Uyghur, Dungan, Uzbek, and Turkish cuisines, representing the largest minorities in the country.

== Meat dishes ==
Meat in various forms has always been an essential part of Kyrgyz cuisine. Among the most popular meat dishes are horse-meat sausages (qazı or chuchuk), roasted sheep's liver, beshbarmak (a dish containing boiled and shredded meat with thin noodles), and various other delicacies made from horse meat.

=== Beshbarmak ===
Beshbarmak is the Kyrgyz national dish, although it is also common in Kazakhstan and in Xinjiang (where it is called narin). It consists of horse meat (or mutton/beef) boiled in its own broth for several hours and served over homemade noodles sprinkled with parsley. Beshbarmak means "five fingers" in the Kyrgyz language, and is so called probably because the dish is typically eaten with the hands. Beshbarmak is most often made during a feast to celebrate the birth of a new child, an important birthday, or to mourn a death in the family, either at a funeral or on an anniversary. If mutton is used instead of horse meat, a boiled sheep's head is placed on the table in front of the most honored guest, who cuts bits and parts from the head and offers them around to the other guests at the table.

=== Dimlama ===
Dimlama is a stew consisting of meat, potatoes, onions, vegetables and fruits.

=== Kuurdak ===
Kuurdak is one of the main meat dishes.

=== Shashlik ===
Shashlik, skewered chunks of mutton grilled over smoking coals that come with raw sliced onions, is served in restaurants and often sold on the street. The meat is usually marinated for hours before cooking. Shashlyk can also be made from beef, chicken, and fish. Each shashlik typically has a fat-to-meat ratio of one-to-one.

=== Shorpo ===
Shorpo (or sorpo) is a meat soup.

=== Laghman ===
Laghman is a dish consisting of meat, vegetables and pulled noodles.

=== Paloo ===
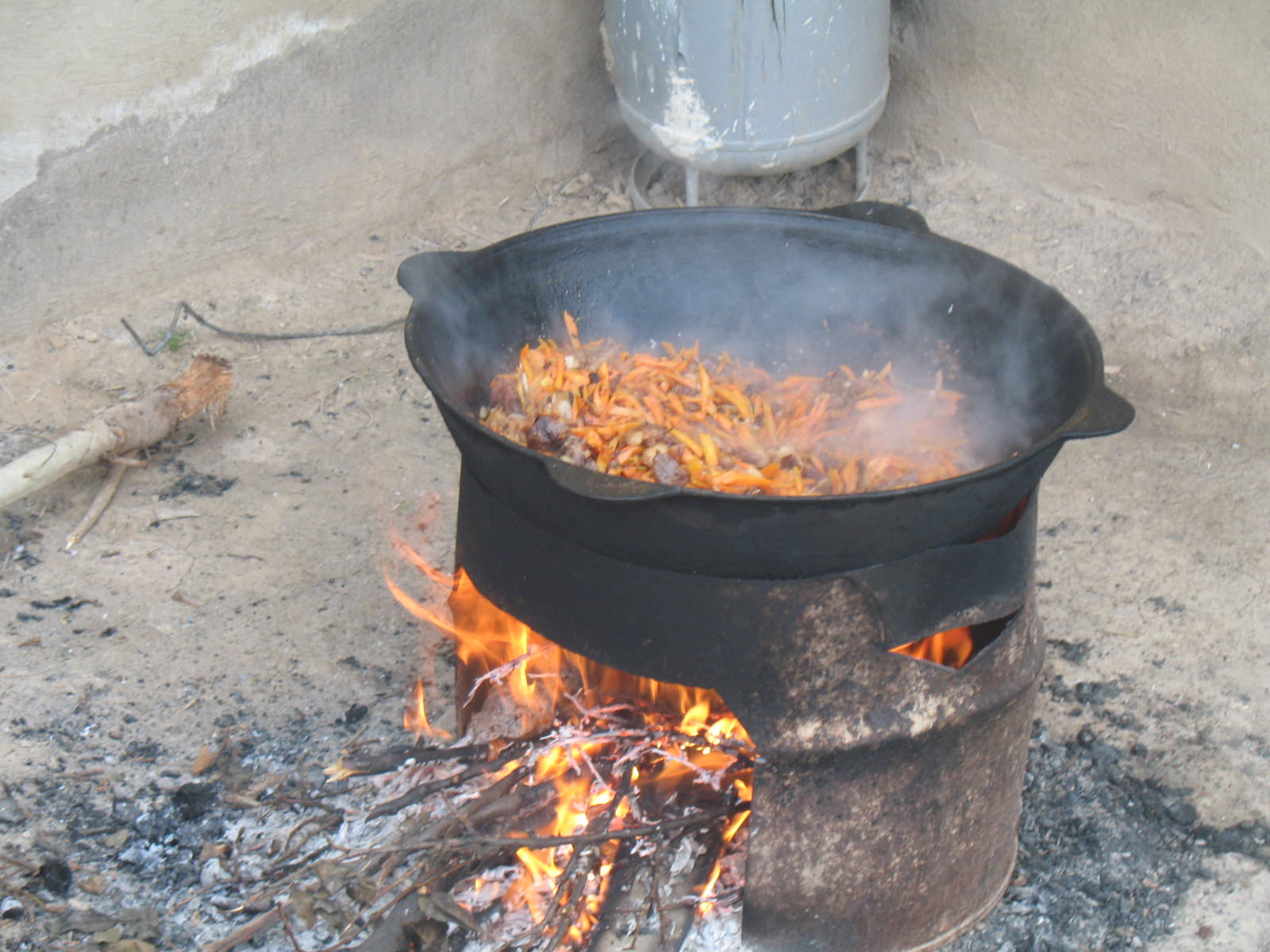
Cooking paloo

Paloo (Kyrgyz: палоо or күрүч/аш) is the Kyrgyz version of what is generally referred to as plov in Central Asian cuisine. It consists of pieces of meat (generally mutton or beef, but sometimes chicken) fried in a large qazan (a cast-iron cauldron) and mixed with fried shredded carrots, jiucai (garlic chives) and cooked rice. The dish is garnished with whole fried garlic cloves and hot red peppers. Uzgen paloo is made with locally grown rice from the southern Uzgen District of Kyrgyzstan. Shirin paloo, a close relative of shirin plov in Azerbaijani cuisine, is a vegetarian dish in which meat is replaced with dried fruits, such as prunes, apricots, and raisins.

Paloo is the Kyrgyzified form of the Persian word polow or polo, related in etymology to pilaf. In Russian the dish is called plov (Russian: плов), in Turkish pilav, in Turkic languages ash, and in Tajik osh.

== Noodles and dumplings ==
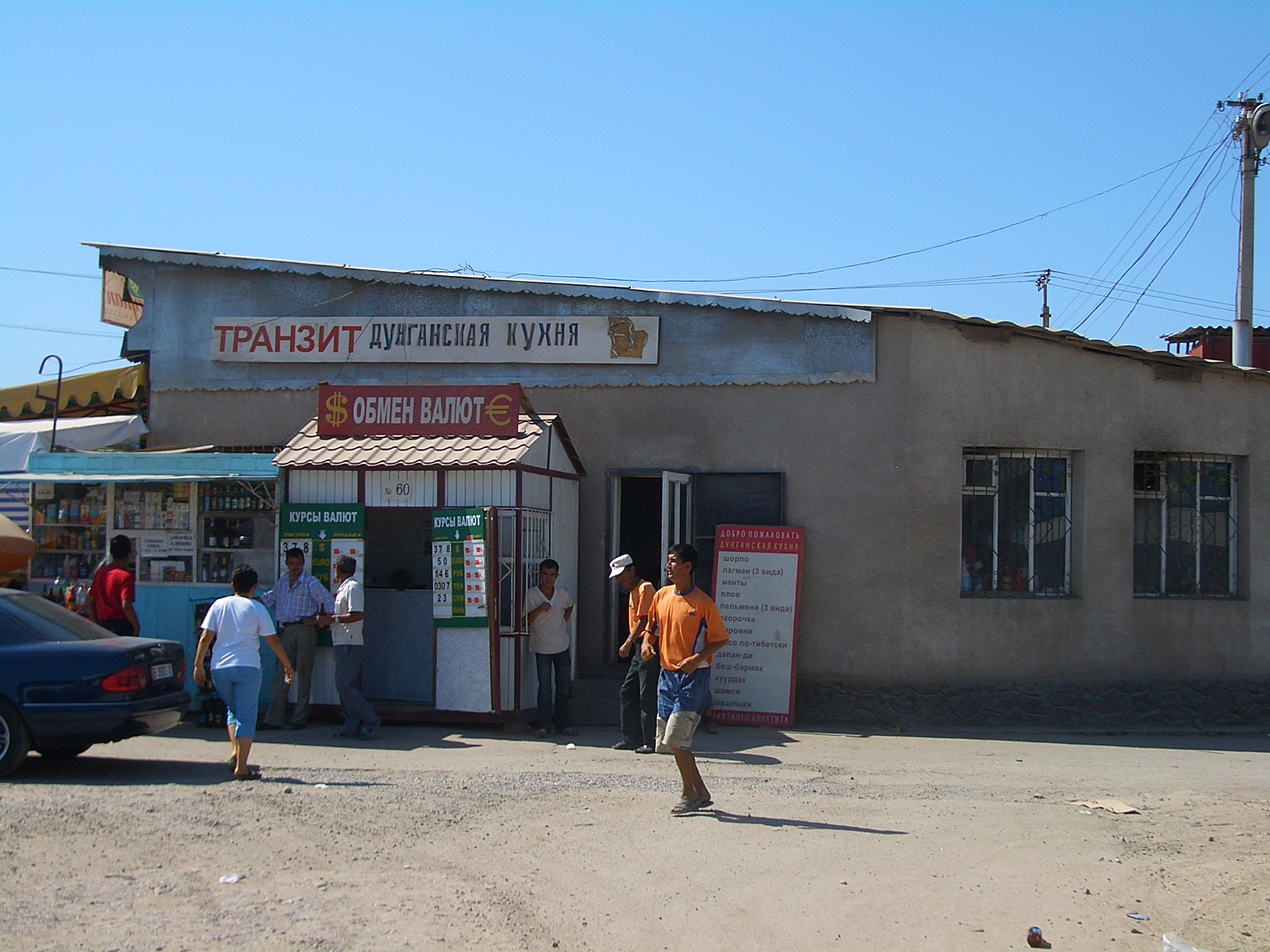
Many restaurants in Bishkek advertise "Dungan cuisine" (Дунганская кухня, Dunganskaya kukhnya)

Manty are steamed dumplings filled with ground meat and onions.

Samsa are little pockets with meat and vegetables wrapped in flaky pastry or bread, very similar to Indian samosas. They are most often stuffed with mutton and fat, but are also made with chicken, cheese, cabbage, beef, and even pumpkin. They can be bought in most bazaars or on street corners in larger cities.

Lagman (or laghman) is a very popular noodle dish. It consists of thick noodles created by stretching a very simple flour dough, then covered in chopped peppers and other vegetables and served in a spicy vinegary sauce. Lagman is served everywhere in Kyrgyzstan, but is considered a Dungan or Uyghur dish.

Ashlyamfu is a cold dish with noodles made from dough and contains bouillon from meat and vegetables.

== Bread and tea ==
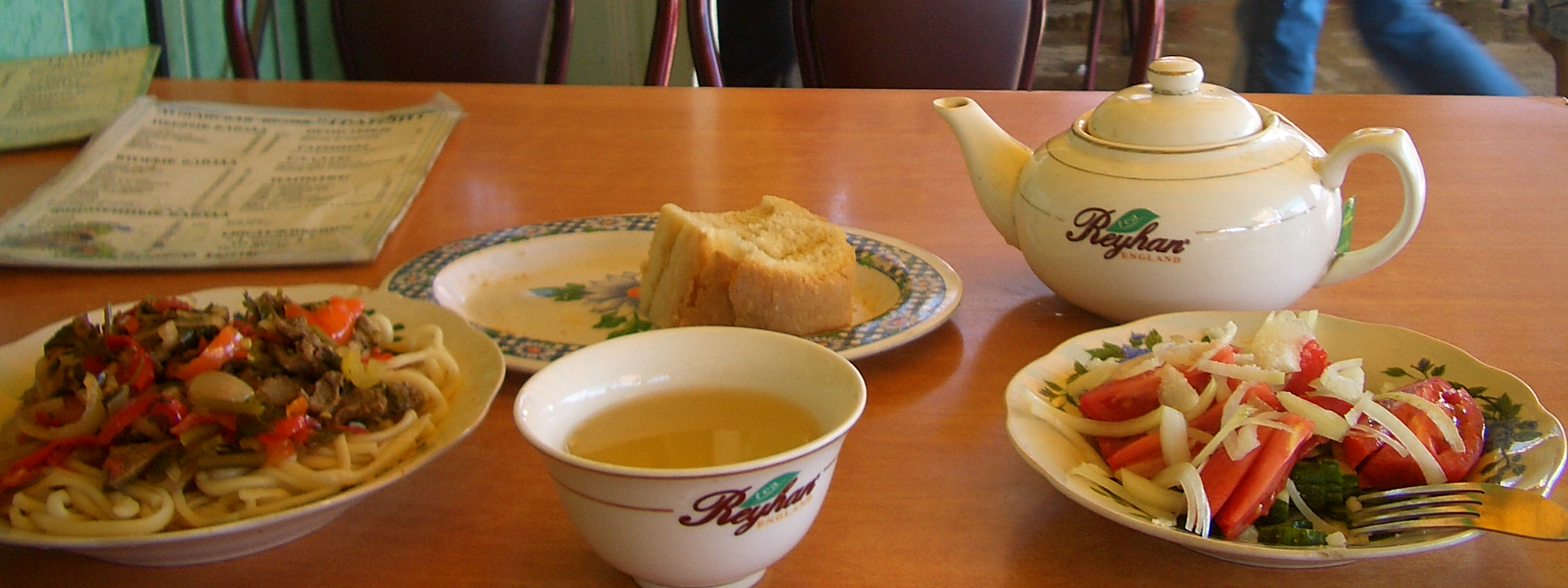
A simple meal at a small Dungan- (Huizu-)style restaurant in Dordoy Bazaar, Bishkek. Laghman (a noodle dish), salad, bread, and tea.

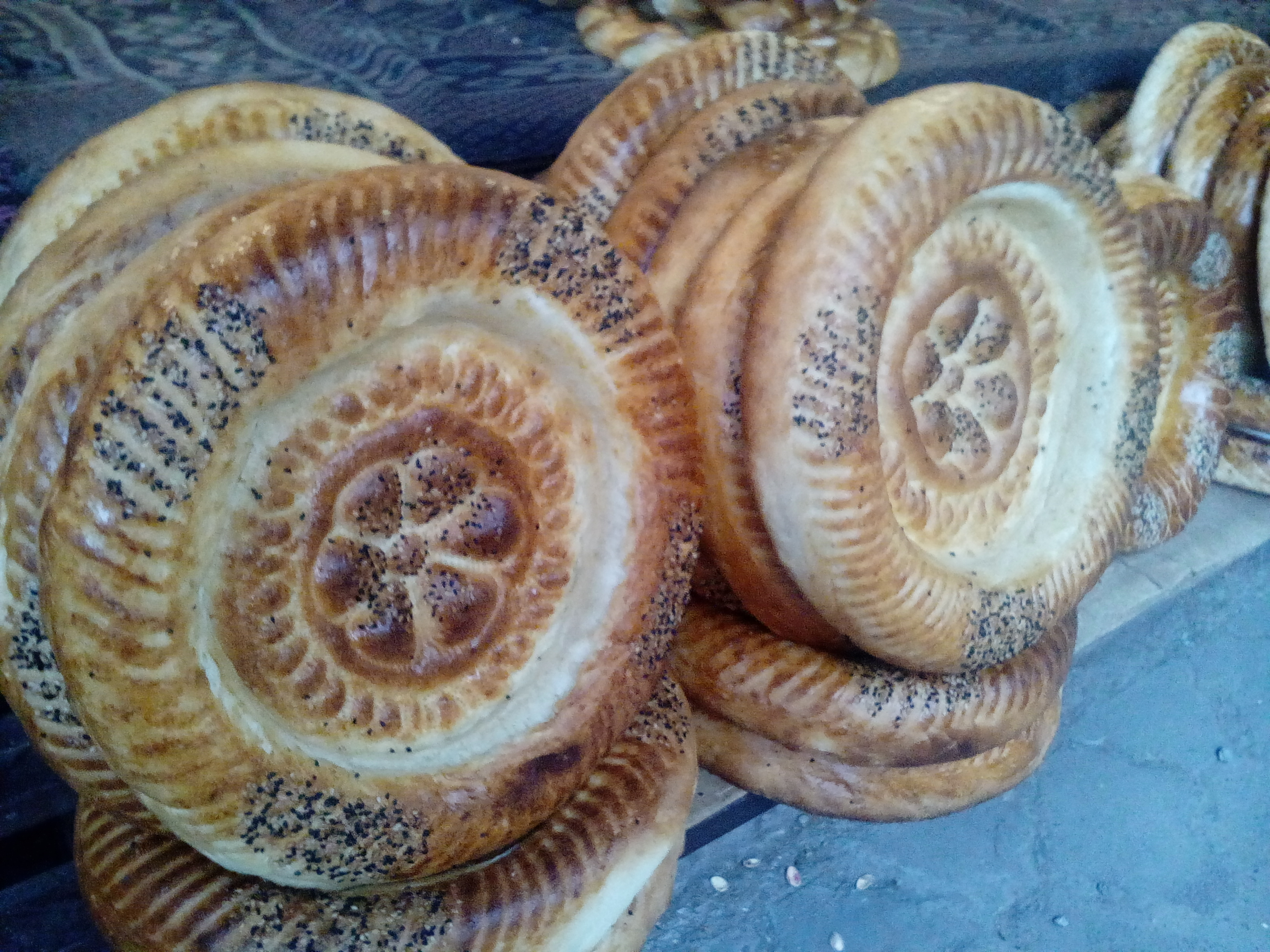
Naan at a market in Osh

Common types of bread (Kyrgyz: нан [nɑn]) available in Kyrgyzstan include Central Asian flatbread (nan), and thick, sturdy Turkish breads. Central Asian flat bread is cooked over coals in tandoori (Kyrgyz: тандыр [tɑndɯr]) ovens, and is round and relatively flat.

More traditional bread products include qattama and boorsoq, two types of fried bread.

The Kyrgyz often eat various breads by dipping them in jam, kaymak, butter (or sary may), or the like. Boorsoq is sometimes eaten suspended in tea, or dipped in honey.

Bread is valued as sacred in Kyrgyz culture, and a good host always offers a guest bread at the very least (often with tea), even if the guest is only staying for a few moments.

== Beverages ==
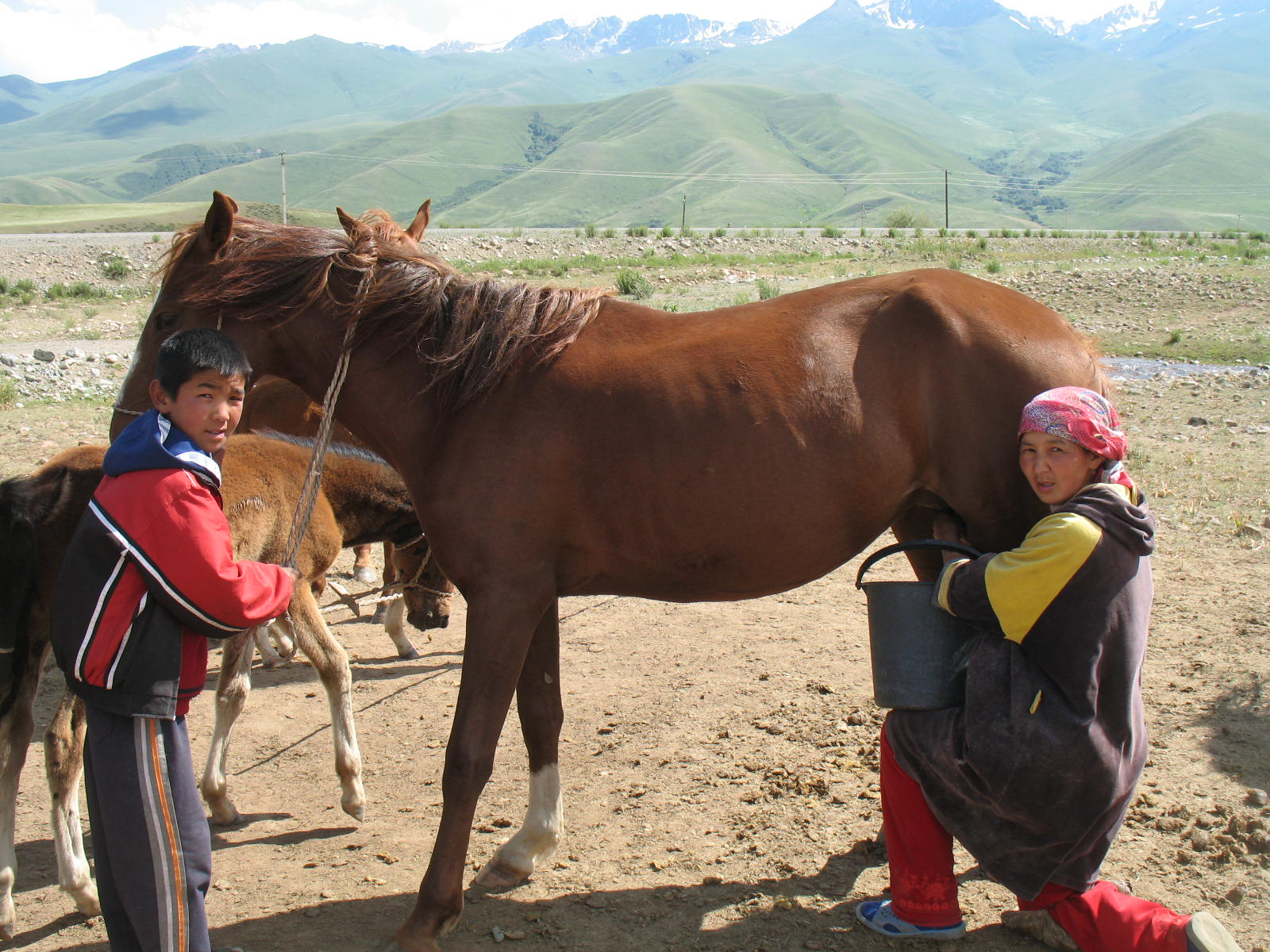
Mare's milk is used to make kymyz

A popular Kyrgyz beverage is kymyz (Kyrgyz: кымыз [qɯmɯz]), a slightly alcoholic drink made by fermenting mare's milk. This drink is considered to be the signature drink of Euroasian nomadic culture, as it is also consumed in Kazakhstan and Mongolia. Fresh kymyz is only available in the summer, from about May until August, when it can commonly be purchased by the roadside in mountainous areas.

There are many beverages that could be described as traditional Kyrgyz drinks. One such popular non-alcoholic beverage, especially in the summer, is maksym, a slightly fizzy drink made by fermenting grains. Maksym was traditionally made in small quantities by women for family consumption; however, this drink was introduced as a commercial product in Bishkek by the company Shoro, after which it became widely available all over Kyrgyzstan. Maksym is usually made from malt, but other types of grains may be used in its preparation. There are different methods and recipes for it that vary by region. It is prepared by boiling ground malt or other type of cereals in water. After reaching a certain state of readiness this substance is cooled and undergoes a fermentation process caused by yeast. Maksym is usually consumed chilled.

Jarma is a similar drink derived from ground cereals. It is made in almost the same way as maksym, except that instead of being fermented, it is mixed with ayran to make it slightly fizzy.

Another fizzy drink made from ayran is chalap (sometimes marketed as Tan). Other traditional drinks are sheep's milk and its products (such as qurut) and camel's milk. The two primary companies that commercially produce Kyrgyz national drinks are Shoro and Enesay.

Bozo is a slightly alcoholic drink prepared from wheat.
