= Hingel =

Traditional Caucasian dish

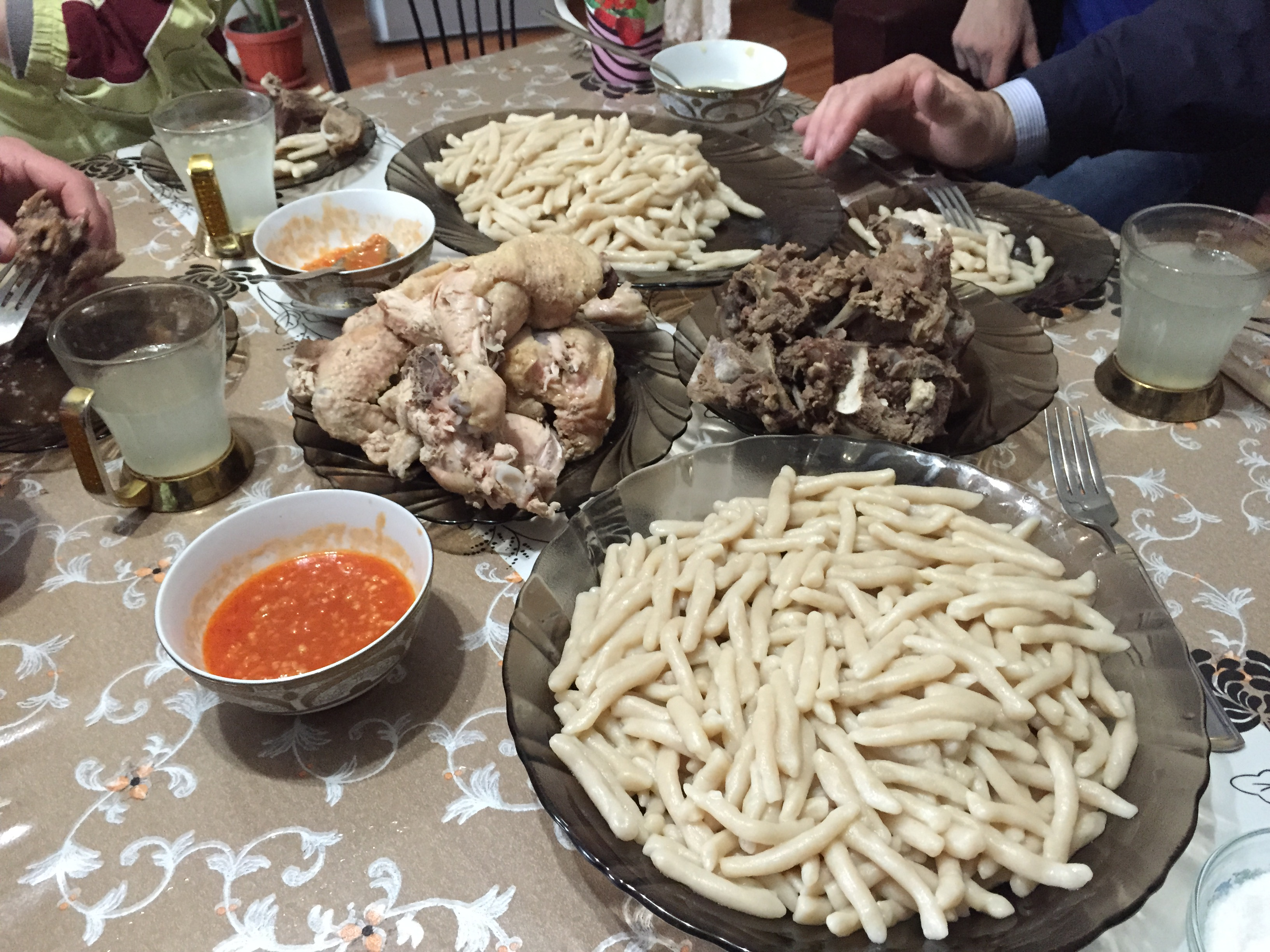
Khinkal

Hingel (Azerbaijani: xəngəl, Turkish: hingel ) is a type of dumpling found in South Caucasus and North Caucasus that is similar to manti. The name of this dish in Azerbaijani Turkish is derived from the combination of the words "Xan" and "gəl".

The meat version of the dish is often associated with the Turkish province of Ardahan and Posof but there is a stuffed potato variety said to hail from Erzurum in eastern Anatolia. The stuffed meat variety resembles a larger than average Turkish manti, but unlike manti, the filling includes onion, garlic and parsley as well as ground meat. It is served with a sauce of melted butter and yogurt.

The stuffed potato version is also sometimes called Sivas mantisi, named after the Sivas Province. In some versions from Sivas, the hingel dough may be shaped triangularly and boiled plain without any filling. Like other versions, this version is also served with a yogurt and butter sauce.

The iconic diamond shaped version of Hingel which is a staple of the cuisine of the Northwestern regions of Azerbaijan, usually served with qatiq, qurut and caramelized onions, aswell as with potatoes in the Gadabay region of Azerbaijan. The specific type is also famous with the Karapapakhs of Kvemo Kartli.

== History ==
We can see the history of the formation of the leaf khangel or hingel, which became famous as the Azerbaijani Hingel today, in sources dating back to the 19th century. Thus, in the cookbook called "Karname", which was written and completed in 1883, we can see that khangel was formed in the geography of Azerbaijan. In "Karname", we see that the areas where this dish is cooked are the citires of Azerbaijan: Barda, Şirvan, Şəki, Şamaxı.

The earliest form of khangal can be seen in the medieval recipe for a dish called "Bughra Khan". The story of how this dish was named "Bugra Khan" was as follows: One day, the soldiers were hungry and asked, "What should we cook?" Bugra Khan quickly took some dough, flattened it in his palm, and threw it into the pot. However, there are fundamental differences between today's hingel and the hingel cooked at that time. We see that hingel differs significantly from today's hingel in terms of both its size and its characteristics such as cutting and cooking in meat broth.

== See also ==
- Khinkali
