= Jarma (drink) =

Kyrgyz beverage

- Type: Grain/dairy product
- Course: Beverage
- Region or state: Kyrgyzstan
- Serving temperature: Cold
- Main ingredients: Fried cereals, water, salt, ayran

Jarma (Kyrgyz: жарма, [ʤɑɾmɑ́]) is a cold beverage made from ground grains found in the cuisine of Kyrgyzstan. While related to the fermented drink maksym, it is not fermented, and is instead often mixed with ayran (liquidy yoghurt) to result in a similar fizzy sensation.

A commercially produced version of jarma is available from the companies Shoro and Enesay. It is marketed as thirst-quenching and immunity-strengthening (due to its microorganism and vitamin contents), and Shoro produces it without GMO ingredients or preservatives.

== History ==
During the Soviet era, jarma was made and drunk exclusively in the private sphere. Commercial production of the drink began in the early 1990s by the Shoro (company). Today it is sold in stores and from barrels on the street throughout Kyrgyzstan, and is a popular go-to chilled drink during the summer. A small-scale producer and vendor in Nooken District was charging 23 soms (about 0.40 USD) per litre of jarma in the summer of 2015.

== Preparation ==
The exact ingredients and preparation of Jarma vary by region and taste. It can be thick or watery.

Generally, barley, wheat, or corn is fried and ground by a gristmill (including by hand). The ground meal is sifted to separate the chaff and other parts of the cereal.

One way of preparing jarma involves 4 to 5 litres of water, 200 to 300 grams of ground grain, one tablespoon of cooking oil, one tablespoon of wheat flour, and salt to taste. First the flour is fried in the oil, and water is added. As the water starts to boil the ground grain is added in a way to avoid lumps. It's then cooked until it starts to get thick (and will thicken more when cooling). The result is called jarma, though any sort of dairy product (ayran, suzma, or milk) may then be added so that it's more drinkable. Jarma available commercially always contains grain and dairy elements.
