= Enesay =

Beverage company in Kyrgyzstan

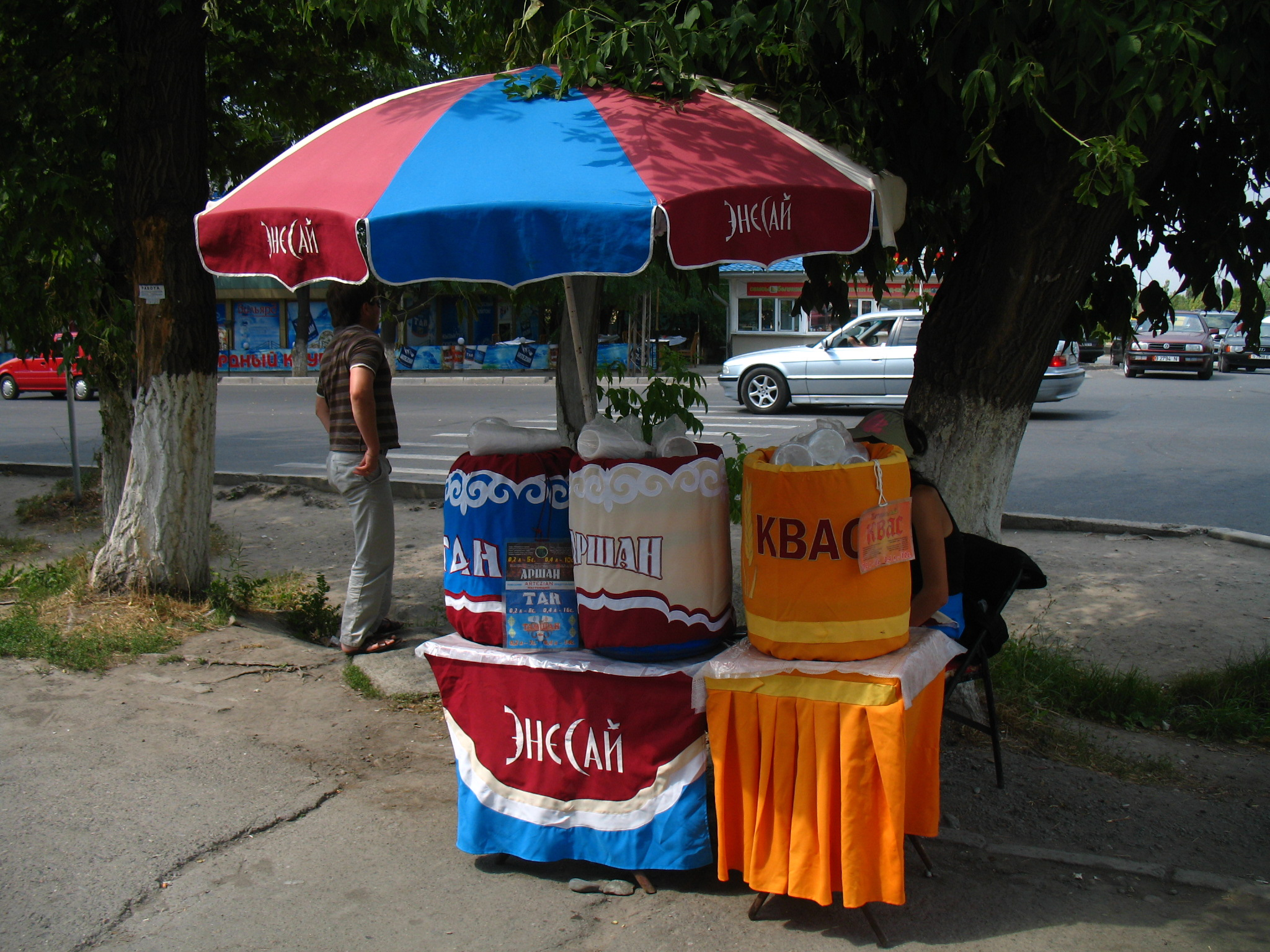
Enesay products being sold on the street in Bishkek.

Enesay (Kyrgyz: Энесай) is a beverage company in Kyrgyzstan. Its primary products are Tan (Kyrgyz: Тан), Arshan (Kyrgyz: Аршан), and Tamshan (Kyrgyz: Тамшан). These beverages are based on the traditional Kyrgyz drinks chalap, maksym, and a mix of them, respectively. They also sell bottled water under the name "Artezian." Their products can be bought in bottles in a majority of stores, or "on tap" on street corners (see picture) and at bazaars in most cities in the country.

Their primary competitor is Shoro, which produces similar beverages and distributes them in similar ways.

Jarma is a cold beverage made from ground grains found in the cuisine of Kyrgyzstan. Jarma is not fermented and is often mixed with ayran to result in a similar fizzy sensation. A commercially produced version of jarma is available from the companies Shoro and Enesay.
