= Khinkali =

Georgian dumpling

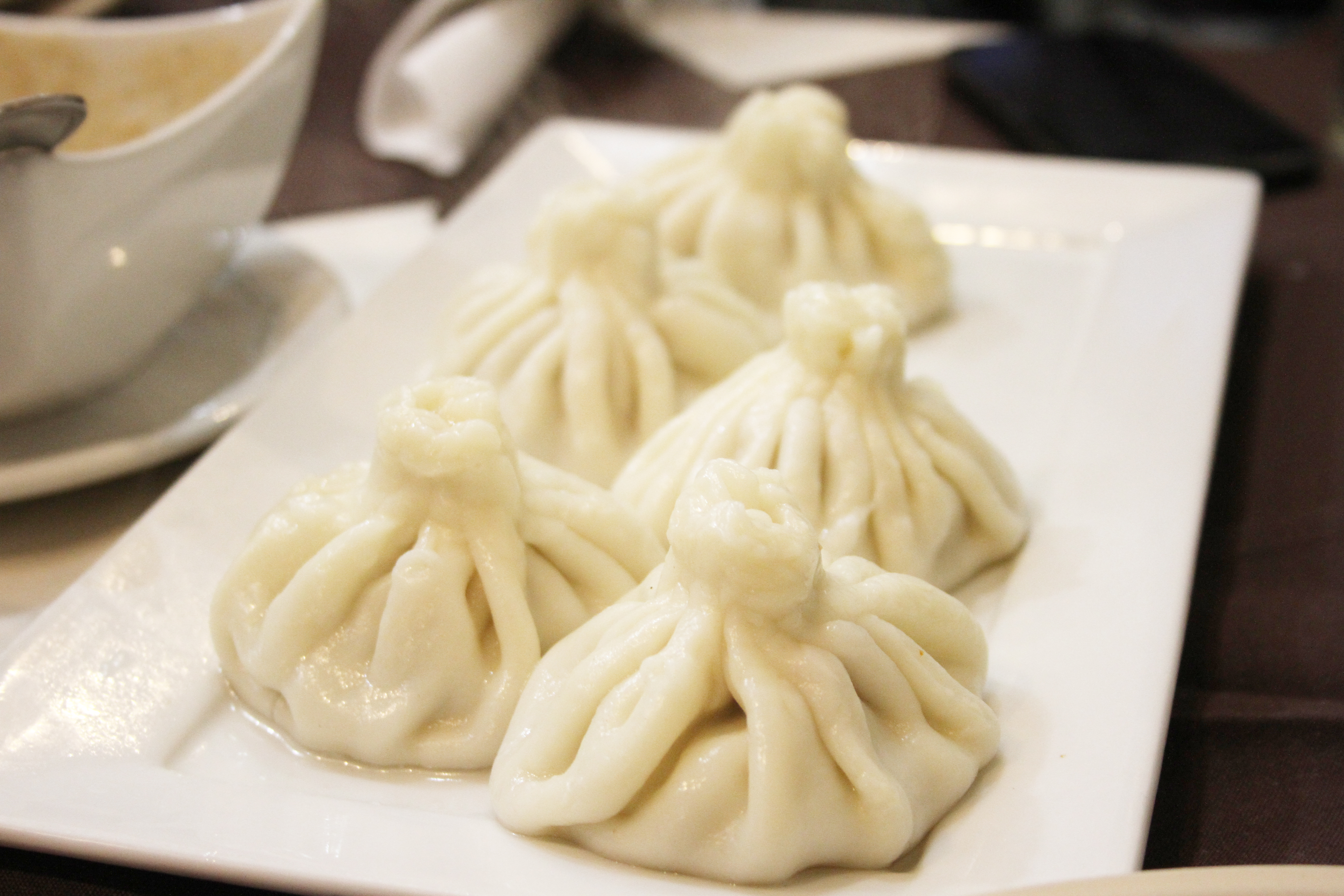
- Type: Dumpling
- Place of origin: Georgia
- Region or state: Mtskheta-Mtianeti
- Serving temperature: Hot
- Main ingredients: Filling: Spiced meat (beef, pork, or lamb), herbs, carum, cumin, satureja, chili pepper, onions, and garlic. Cheese, potato, or mushroom fillings are alternatives to meat.

Khinkali (Georgian: ხინკალი, romanized: khink'ali) is a dumpling in Georgian cuisine. It is made of twisted knobs of dough, stuffed with meat, fish or vegetables and spices. Khinkali originate in the mountainous regions of eastern Georgia. The invention of the dish is credited to the Mokhevians, as well as the Pshavians, Mtiuletians, and Khevsurians. Traditionally, khinkali are made with coarsely chopped meat. In the mountain areas, this method of preparation is still used.

== Ingredients ==
Khinkali fillings vary from area to area. The original recipe, the so-called khevsuruli, consisted of only minced meat (lamb, beef or pork mixed), onions, chili pepper, salt, and cumin. However, the modern recipe used mostly especially in Georgian urban areas, the so-called kalakuri, uses herbs like parsley and coriander. Mushrooms, potatoes, or cheese may be used in place of meat. Beef or lamb is usual in halal and kosher, which never include pork for religious reasons.

== Etiquette ==
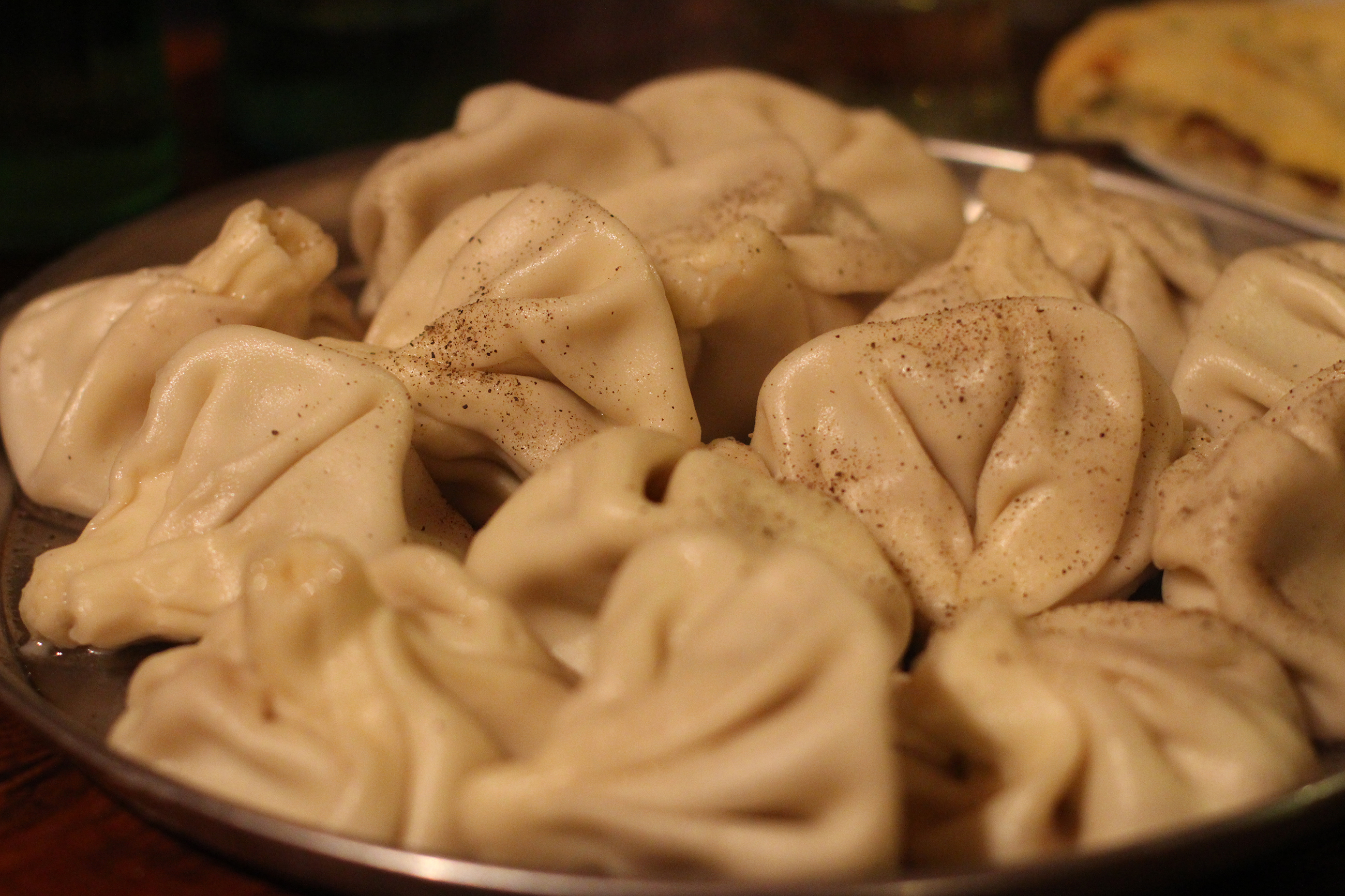
Black pepper is usually used for seasoning.

Khinkali is eaten plain or with ground black pepper. The meat filling is uncooked when khinkali is assembled, so when it is cooked, the juices of the meat are trapped inside the dumpling. To make khinkali juicier, usually warm water or broth is added to the minced meat. Khinkali is typically consumed first by sucking the juices while taking the first bite, similar to xiaolongbao, in order to prevent the dumpling from bursting. The top, where the pleats meet, is tough, and is not supposed to be eaten, but discarded to the plate so that those eating can count how many they have consumed. In Georgia, this top is called the k'udi (Georgian: კუდი, "tail") or k'uch'i (Georgian: კუჭი, "stomach").

There is a widespread etiquette in Georgia to use only one's bare hands while consuming these dumplings. The using of utensils, like a fork, is considered incorrect or childish. This is because juice is an important part of khinkali; using a fork will rupture the khinkali and the juice will be spilled.

== Origins ==
Khinkali originated in the mountainous regions of Georgia, where they were traditionally prepared by shepherds and farmers. The dish was created as a hearty and portable meal, ideal for sustaining individuals during long hours of labor in the rugged landscape.

However, there are some legends involving the origins of khinkali, one of them being that it originated in Mongolia and made its way to Georgia around the 13th century, as Georgia was situated along the Silk Road. Mongolian conquerors would put their meat in dough in order to better conserve it while riding their horses.

However, according to other sources, the traditional dish originated in the mountainous regions of northern Georgia, particularly in the historic provinces of Pshavi and Khevsureti, located north of Tbilisi. It used to be a dish eaten mostly by shepherds during cold and snowy winters.

Initially, khinkalis were stuffed with lamb as it was the most common meat eaten in the mountains. Then, variations were created as it became more popular and reached urban areas. Thus, pork or beef began to be used as a stuffing, and then vegetarian versions were developed. These include mushroom or potato fillings and are commonly eaten in Georgia on Orthodox fasting days.

== Regions ==
Khinkali from Pasanauri is regarded as superior to that from other towns in Georgia.

== See also ==
- Hingel
- Manti
- Momo (food)
- Xiaolongbao
