= Manti (food) =

Type of dumpling popular in Central and West Asia

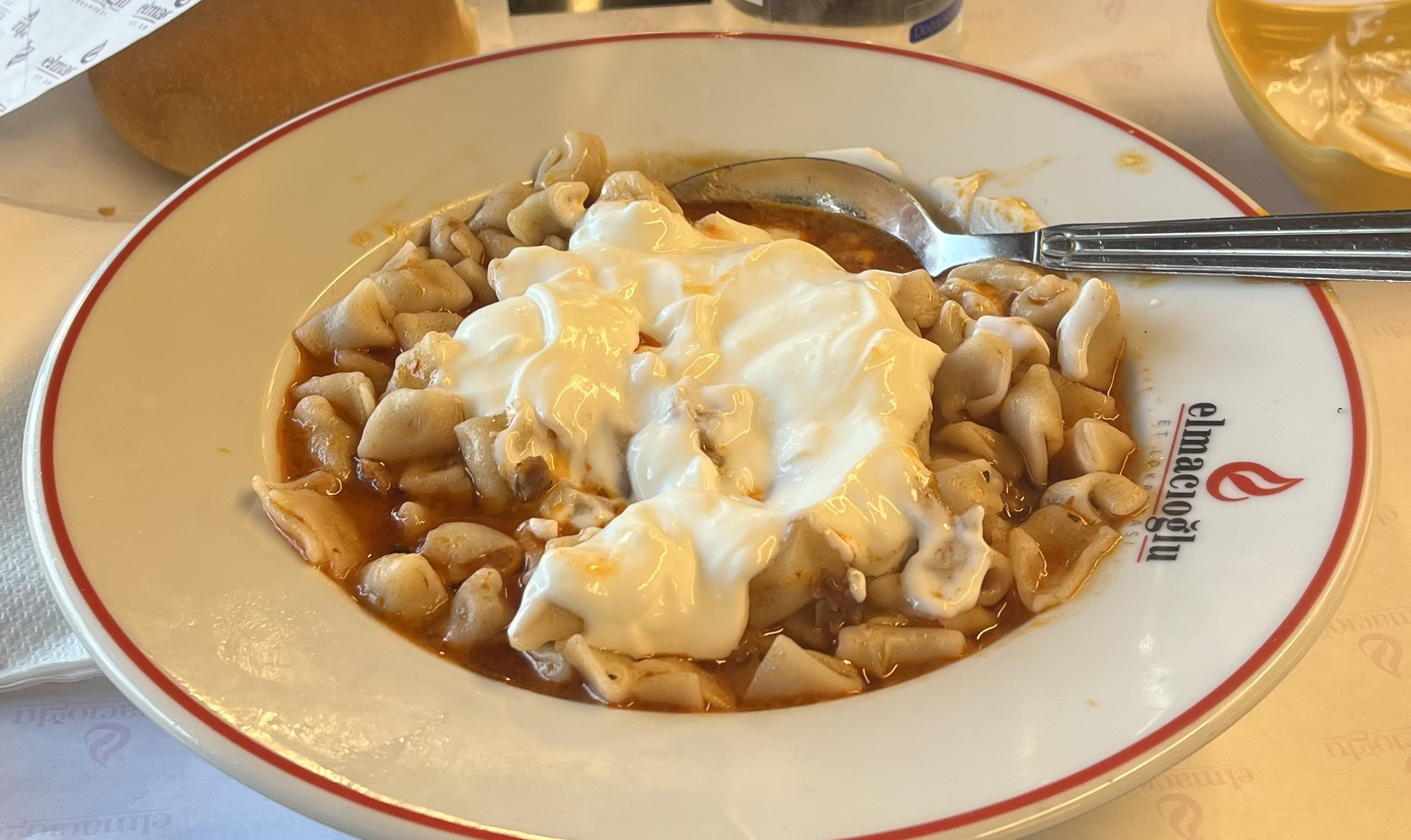

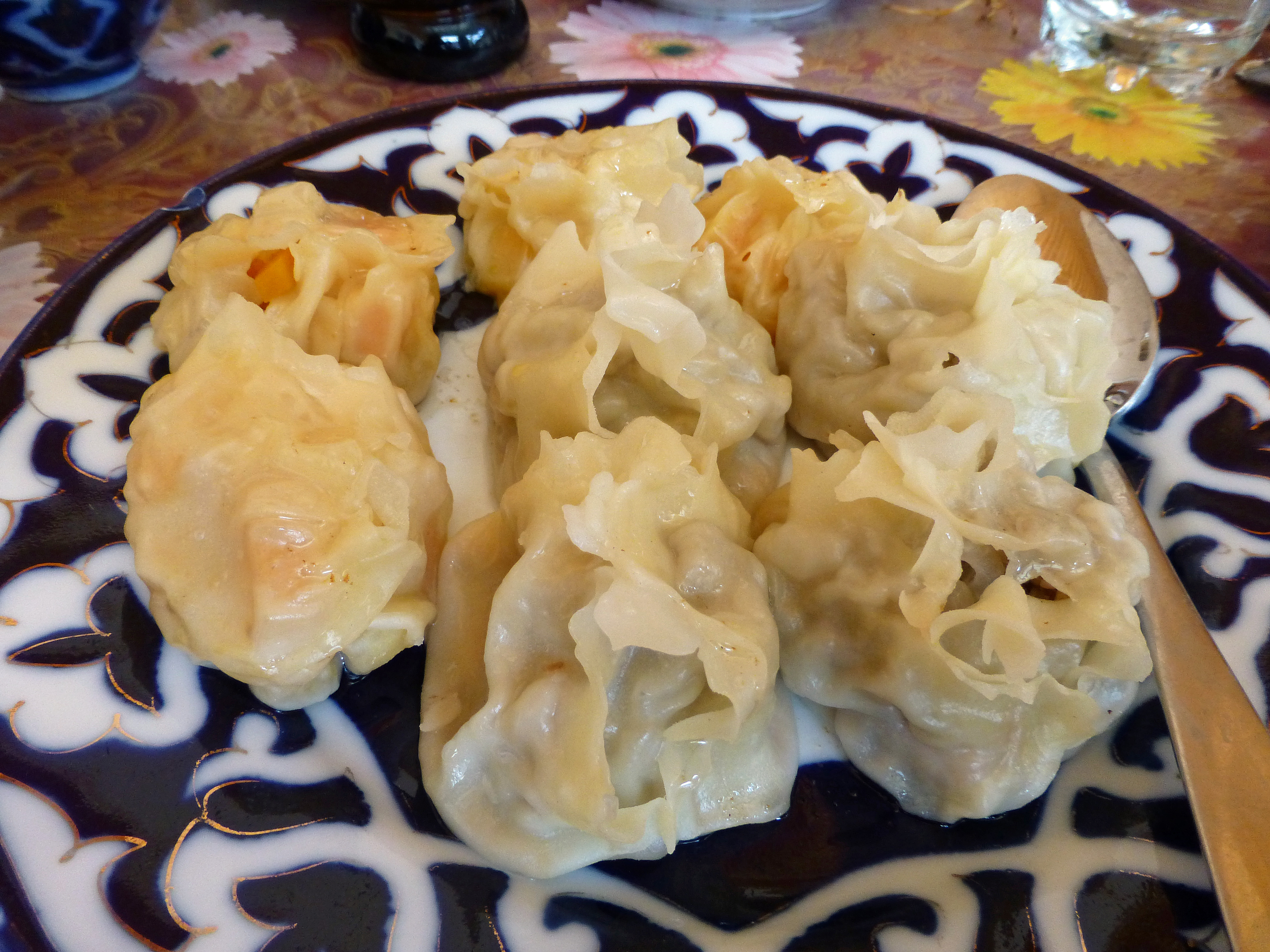
Turkish Kayseri manti (left) and Uzbek manti (right)
- Alternative names: Manty, mantu, manta, mantı
- Type: Dumpling
- Region or state: Central Asia, Caucasus, Balkans
- Main ingredients: Spiced meat (lamb or ground beef), dough
- Ingredients generally used: Yogurt, garlic
- Variations: Hingel, mataz, boraki, khinkali

Manti is a type of dumpling found in Turkish, Uyghur, and Central Asian cuisines, but also found in West Asia, Caucasus, and the Balkans. Manti is also consumed throughout post-Soviet countries, where the dish spread from the Central Asian republics. The dumplings typically consist of a spiced meat mixture, usually lamb or ground beef, wrapped in a thin dough sheet which is then boiled or steamed. The size and shape of manti vary significantly depending on geographic location.

Manti resemble the Chinese jiaozi and baozi, Uyghur manta, Korean mandu, Mongolian buuz and the Tibetan momo. The dish's name is cognate with Chinese mantou, Korean mandu, and Japanese manjū, though the modern Chinese and Japanese counterparts mostly refer to different dishes.

The name, depending on the language, can refer to a single dumpling or to more than one dumpling at a time. In English, it is often used both in singular and plural form.

== History ==
The Chinese word mantou has been suggested as the origin for the word manti. The term mantou (饅頭) appears in early records of the Jin dynasty (266CE–420CE). Different Chinese synonyms such as manshou (饅首) and zhengbing (蒸餅) were also already in use, where both tou and shou mean head in Chinese. Originally, mantou was meat-filled. Mantou still retains its old meaning of stuffed bun in Wu Chinese as moedeu. But in Mandarin and many other varieties of Chinese, mantou refers to plain steamed buns, while baozi resemble the ancient mantou stuffed with meat.

Some of the earliest mentions of dishes resembling Turkic manti date to the Mongol Empire. One such mention of manta is found in the 1330 manuscript Yinshan Zhengyao by Hu Sihui, a Chinese court therapist in service of the Yuan Dynasty Emperor, Buyantu Khan. Some variations may be traced back to the Uyghur people of northwest China.

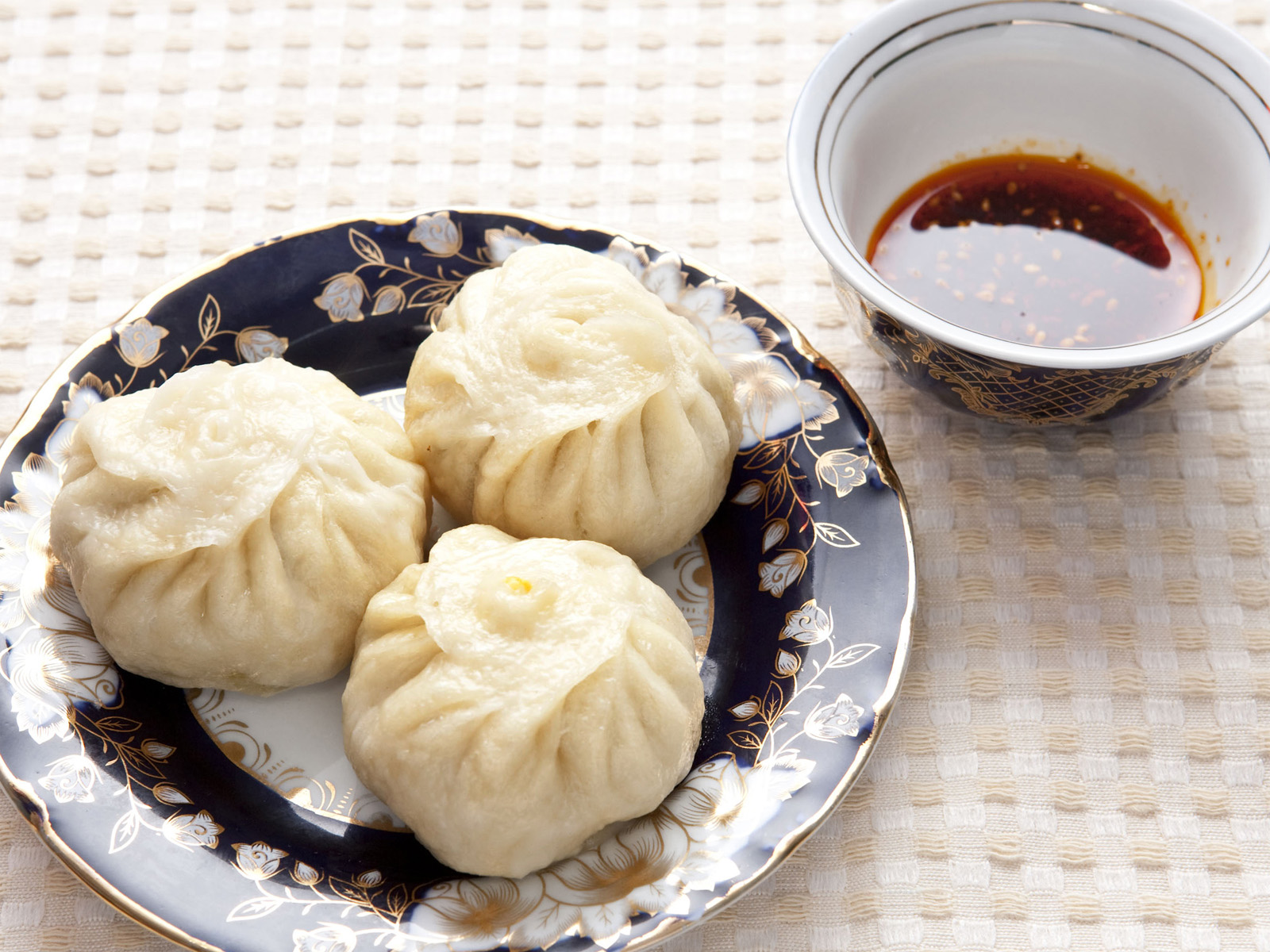
Uyghur-style manta with chili sauce on the side

In general, there is agreement that the recipe was carried across Central Asia along the Silk Road to Anatolia by Turkic and Mongol peoples. According to Holly Chase, "Turkic and Mongol horsemen on the move are supposed to have carried frozen or dried manti, which could be quickly boiled over a camp-fire". Migrating Turkic-speaking peoples brought the dumpling with them to Anatolia, where it evolved into the Turkish mantı. Korean mandu is said to have arrived in Korea through the Mongols in the 14th century.

However, some researchers do not discount the possibility that manti may have originated in the Middle East and spread eastward to China and Korea through the Silk Road.

The earliest written Ottoman mantı recipe appears in a 15th-century cookbook written by Muhammed bin Mahmud Shirvani. The version in Shirvani's book is a steamed dumpling with minced lamb and crushed chickpeas filling spiced with cinnamon and flavored with vinegar. The dish was garnished with sumac and like most contemporary mantı variations, it was served with a garlic-yoghurt sauce.

Many early Turkish cookbooks do not mention a dish called mantı. The first printed recipe book, Melceüt`t Tabâhhin, was published in 1844. It includes a recipe for a dish called Tatar böreği, which is similar to mantı but is not served with garlic yoghurt sauce. The first English-language Ottoman cookbook and a third cookbook printed in 1880 includes this same recipe. Another 1880 cookbook does have a recipe for mantı, but instead of a dumpling, it is a dish composed of layered dough served with mincemeat and garlic yogurt. This book also includes a recipe of piruhi, a cheese filled version of the Tatar böreği recipe.

== Manti in different cuisines ==
=== In Central Asian cuisines ===
Manti in Central Asian cuisines are usually larger in size. They are steamed in a multi-level metal steamer called mantovarka, mantyshnitsa (Russian terms for manti cooker), manti-kazan or manti-kaskan (manti pot). It consists of layered pans with holes that are placed over a stockpot filled with water. Steaming is the main method of cooking manti; if boiled or fried, they are considered another type of dumpling, such as pelmeni.

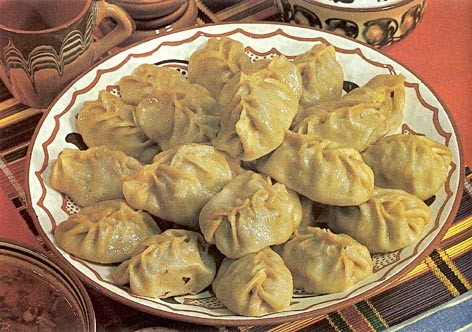
Kazakh manti

In Kazakh cuisine and Kyrgyz cuisine, the manti filling is normally minced lamb (sometimes beef or horse meat), spiced with black pepper, sometimes with the addition of chopped pumpkin or squash. This is considered to be a traditional Uyghur recipe. Manti is served topped with butter, sour cream or an onion sauce or garlic sauce. When sold as street food in Kazakhstan and Kyrgyzstan, manti are typically presented sprinkled with hot red pepper powder.

In Uzbek and Tajik cuisines, manti are usually made of one (or a combination) of the following ingredients: lamb, beef, cabbage, potato or pumpkin, with fat often added to meat manti. Manti is usually topped with butter and maybe served with sour cream, different types of ketchup, or freshly sliced onions (sprinkled with vinegar and black pepper). A sauce made by mixing vinegar and chili powder is also common. Bukharian Jews also use cheese fillings, and such dumplings are usually served with yogurt. In Uzbekistan, manti are also called kaskoni.

The same style of cooking manti is traditional for Tatar, Bashkir and other cuisines of the Turkic peoples living in the vast area from Idel-Ural to the Far East. It is nowadays widespread throughout Russia and other post-Soviet countries. A dish of the same name appears in Russian cuisine in the beginning of the 17th century; it is unknown whether it exactly resembled Central Asian manti, but lamb was also used. Manti was thereafter largely forgotten in Russian cuisine until the reemergence of manti from Central Asian cuisine during the Soviet Union.

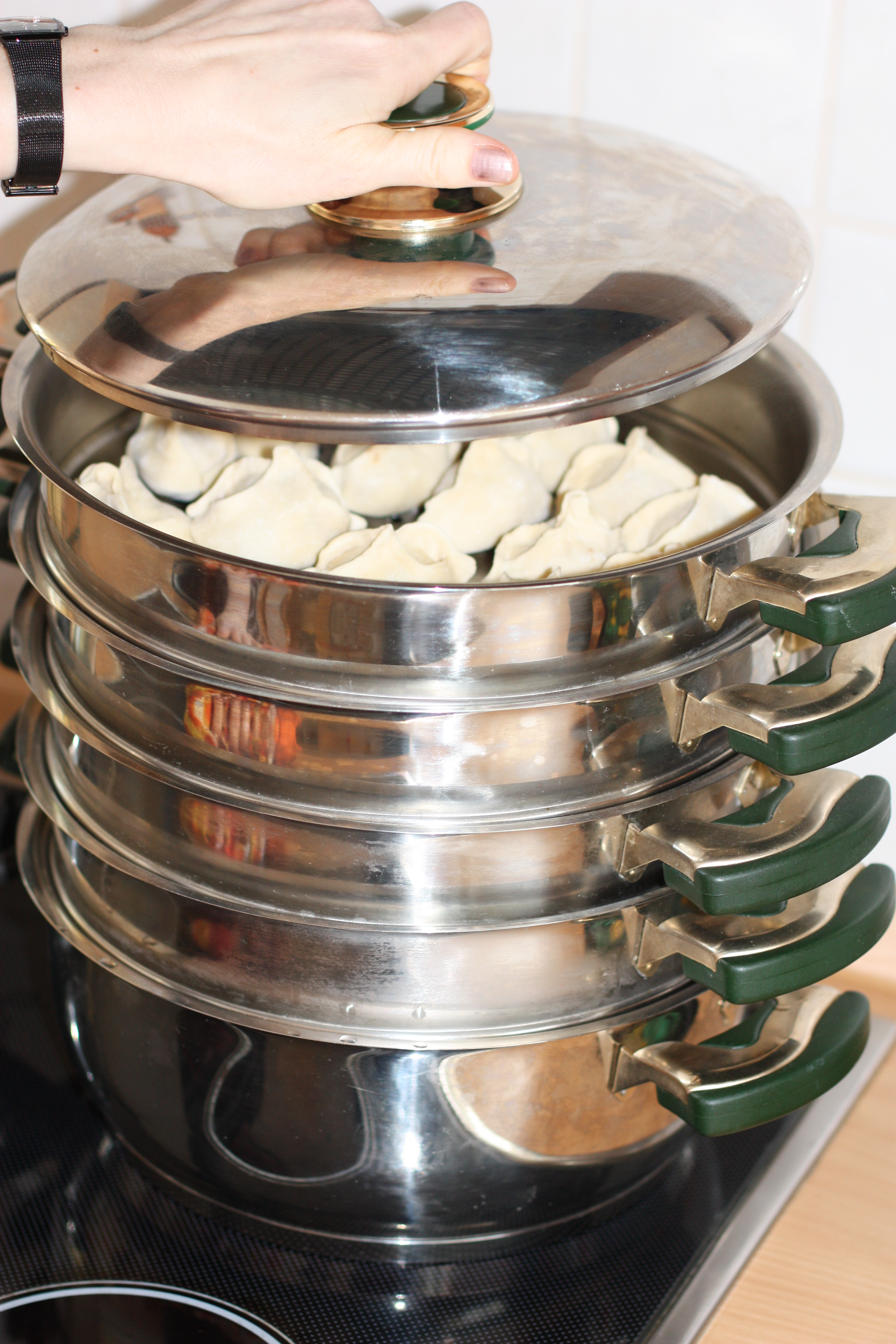
Mantovarka

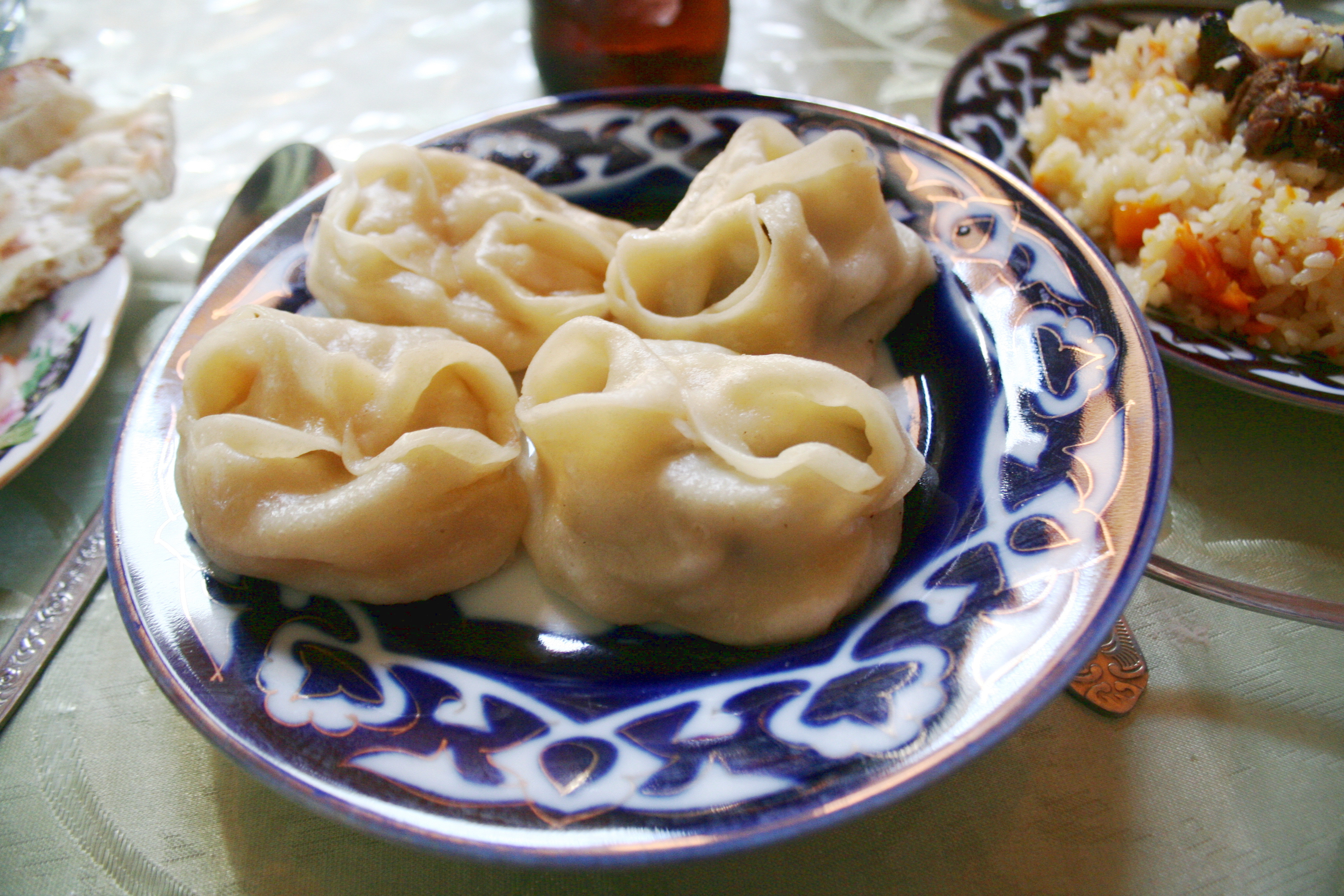
Uzbek manti

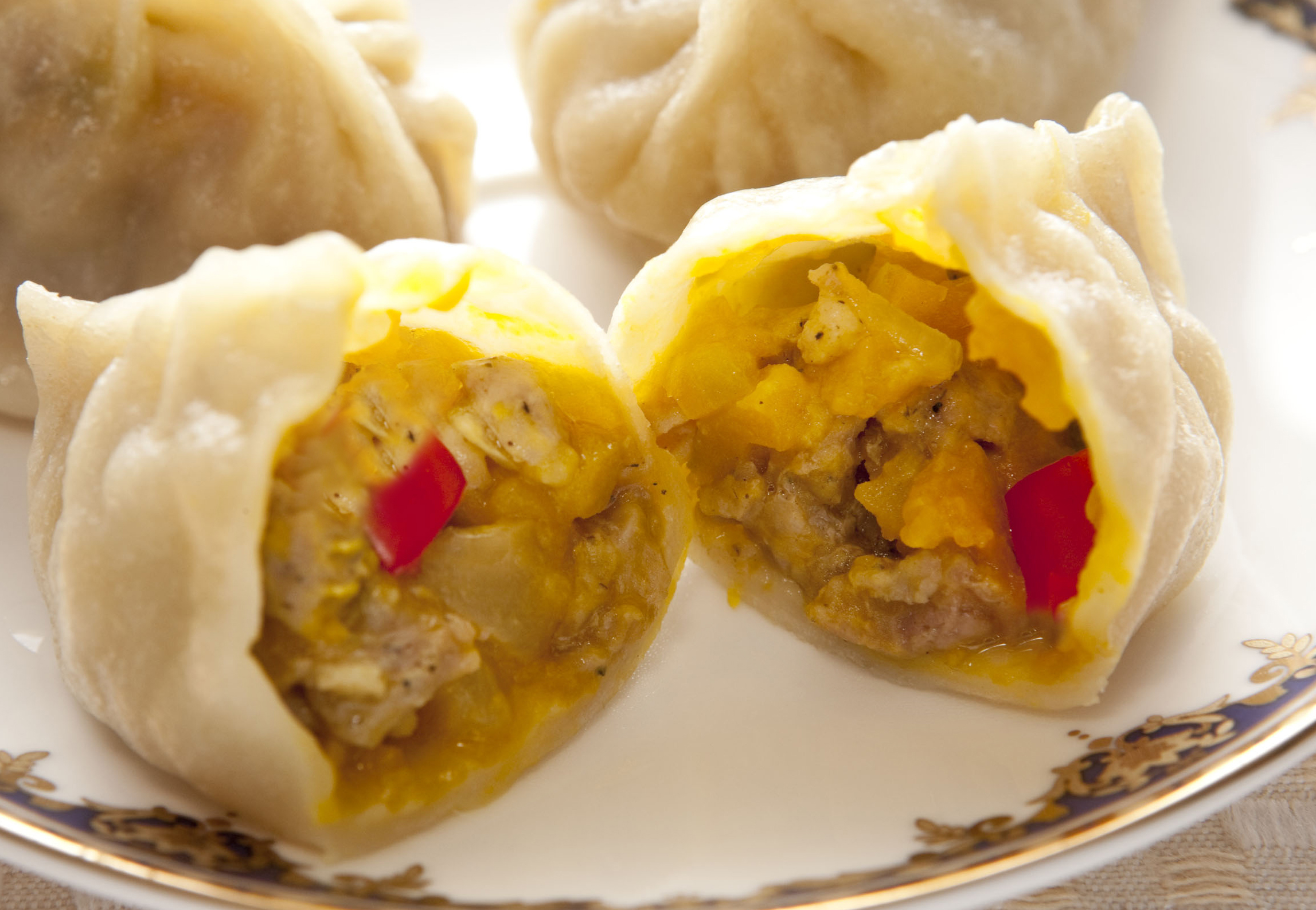
Manti filled with pumpkin

=== In Afghan cuisine ===
In Afghan cuisine, the thinly rolled out dough of the mantu is filled with beef or lamb mixed with minced onions and spices, steamed and then topped with a yoghurt-based sauce. The sauce (seer mosst, lit. "garlic yoghurt") is made with chaka (thick, creamy, strained and salted yoghurt), lemon juice, dried and fresh mint, green and red chili powder and pressed garlic. The mantu can also be topped with a tomato-based sauce which can include split peas or red kidney beans and/or sautéed ground meat. This depends on the meat that was used for the filling of the mantu. The amount of yoghurt sauce is typically more than the tomato and ground meat sauce; the sauce is meant to be dotted on top so as to not cover the entire dish. However, separate dishes containing more of the ground meat, split peas, tomato sauce, and yoghurt sauce may also be kept at the table or dastarkhān. Some Afghans also like to serve mantu with a carrot qorma or stew, instead of a tomato-based sauce. Now it is also famous in some areas of Pakistan due to Afghan refugees. The authentic Afghan mantu dumplings are supposed to be small and bite-sized. The dough is supposed to be thinned out so that it is not chewy to bite on nor should one feel like they are eating more dough than filling. In Afghanistan, the dough is traditionally made from scratch, while among the Afghan diaspora in the West it is more common to use wonton wrappers. There is a specific pattern in which the dough of each dumpling is twisted and closed around the filling. There is a variation of this dish in Afghanistan known as aushak, in which the filling is different and it is made by boiling the dumplings instead of steaming them.

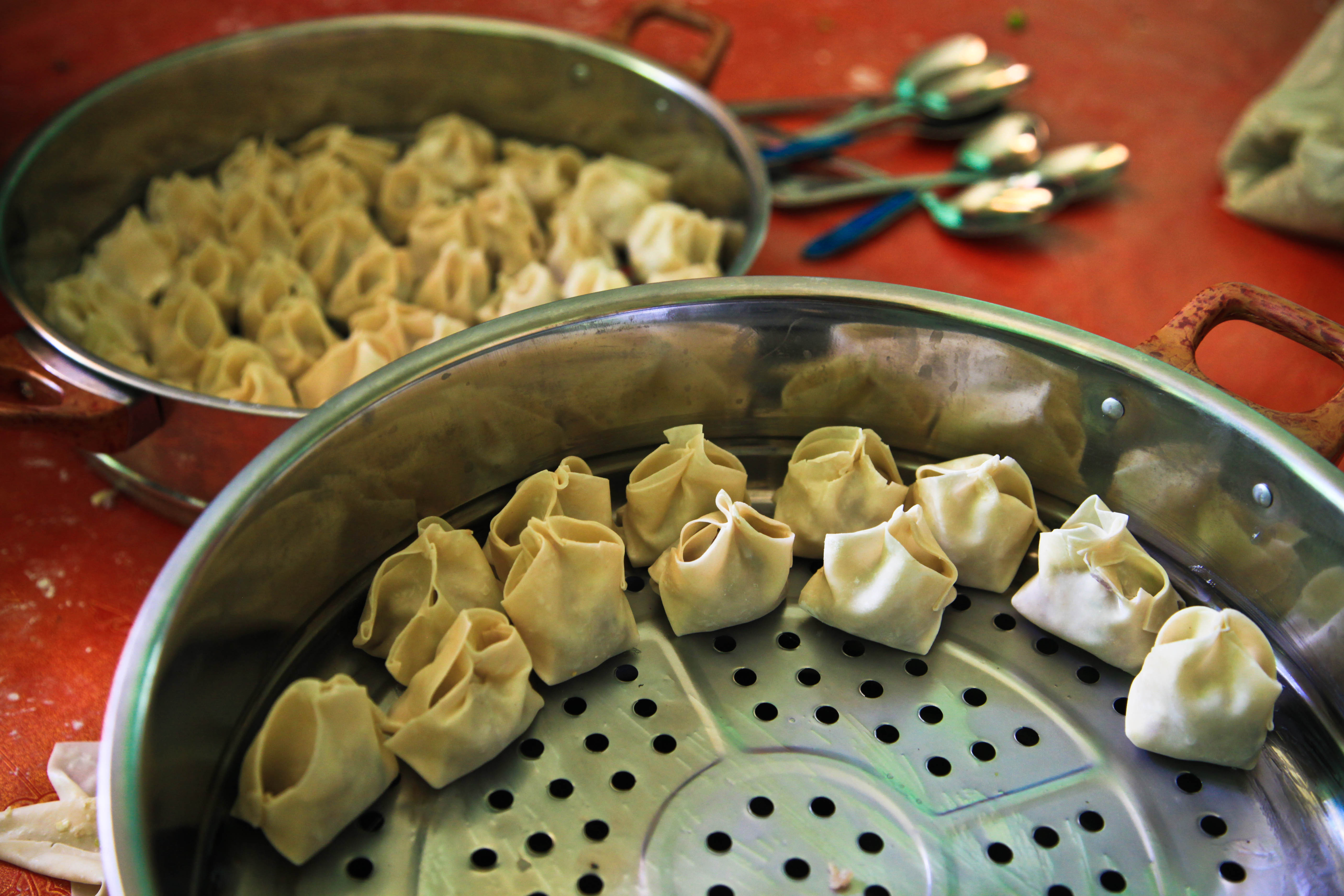
Afghan mantu in a steamer before cooking

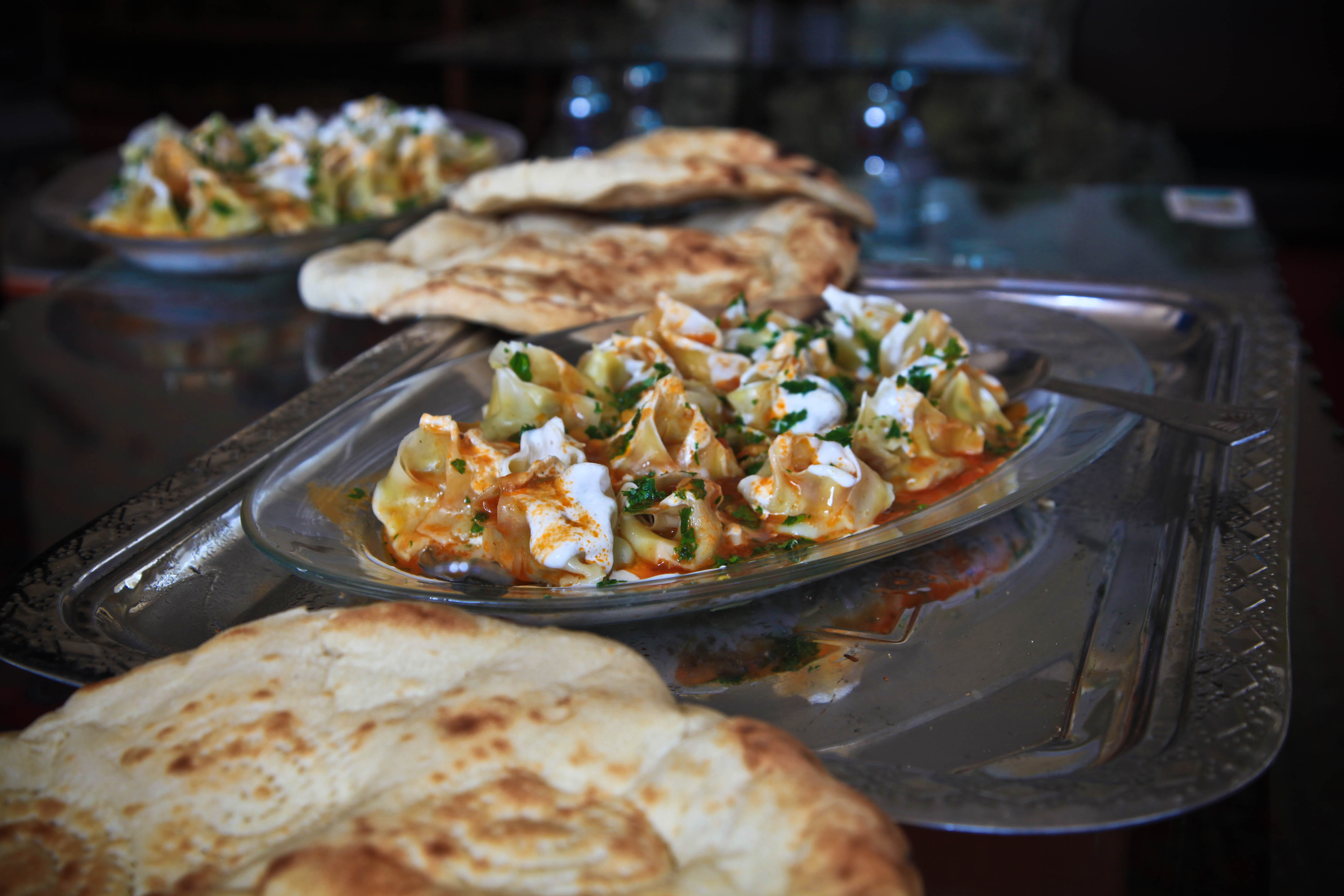
Afghan dish of mantu

=== In Turkish and Armenian cuisine ===
In contrast to the Central Asian varieties, manti in Anatolia and Transcaucasia are usually boiled or baked rather than steamed and tend to be small in size. In modern Armenian cuisine, mantı are typically served topped with yoghurt and garlic and spiced with red pepper powder and melted butter and topped with ground sumac and/or dried mint by the consumer.

Similarly, the Armenian manti, also sometimes referred to as monta, are usually served with yoghurt (matzoon) or sour cream (ttvaser) and garlic, accompanied by clear soup (mantapour). Manti are more common among western Armenians, while among eastern Armenians and Georgians, similar dumplings called khinkali are more prevalent. Unlike all other regional varieties of manti, whether served with or without yogurt Armenian manti is always baked and crunchy, never just steamed or boiled.

A popular type of Turkish mantı is known as Kayseri mantısı, a cultural marker of the Central Anatolian city Kayseri. Kayseri mantısı is tiny and served with yoghurt, melted butter (typically flavored with spearmint or Aleppo pepper) and topped with dry mint and Aleppo pepper flakes. Manti may be made from shredded meat of quail, chicken or goose in some regions of Turkey, while boş mantı ("empty dumpling") lack filling entirely.

Turkish cuisine includes also other dumplings similar to manti, such as hingel and Tatar böreği. These are typically larger than Kayseri mantısı.

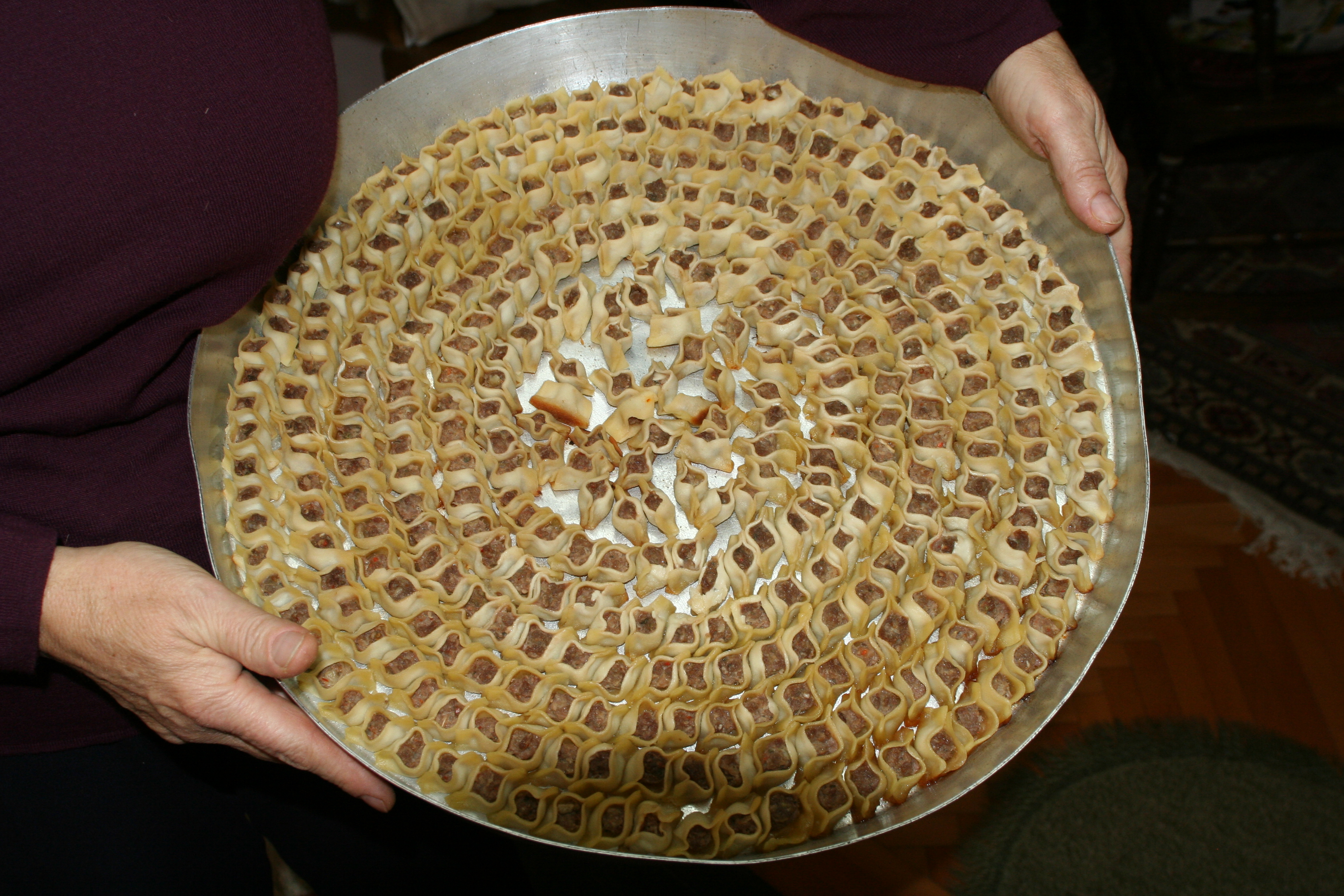
Baked Armenian manti

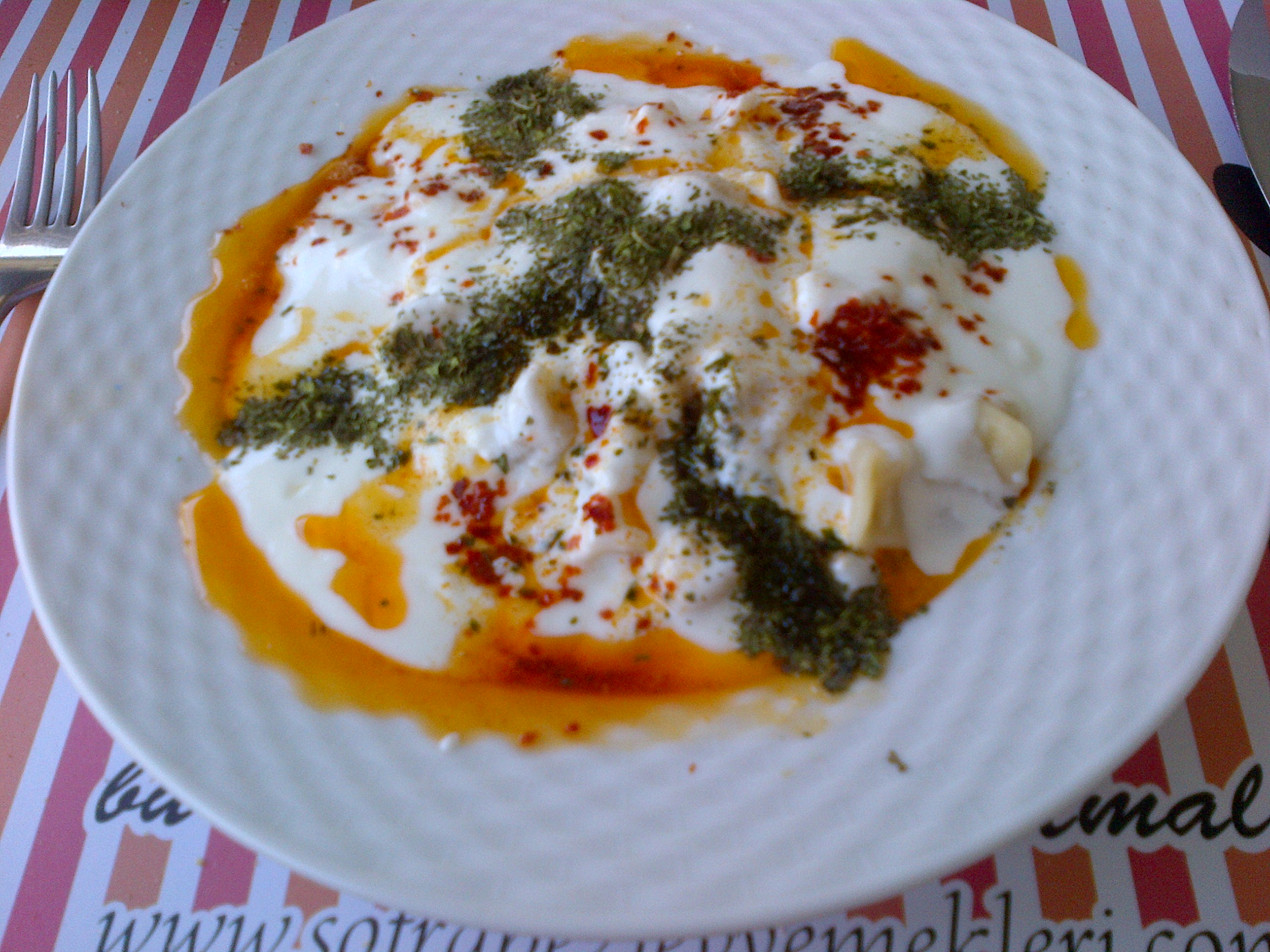
Turkish mantı with melted butter, garlic-yogurt sauce and Aleppo pepper

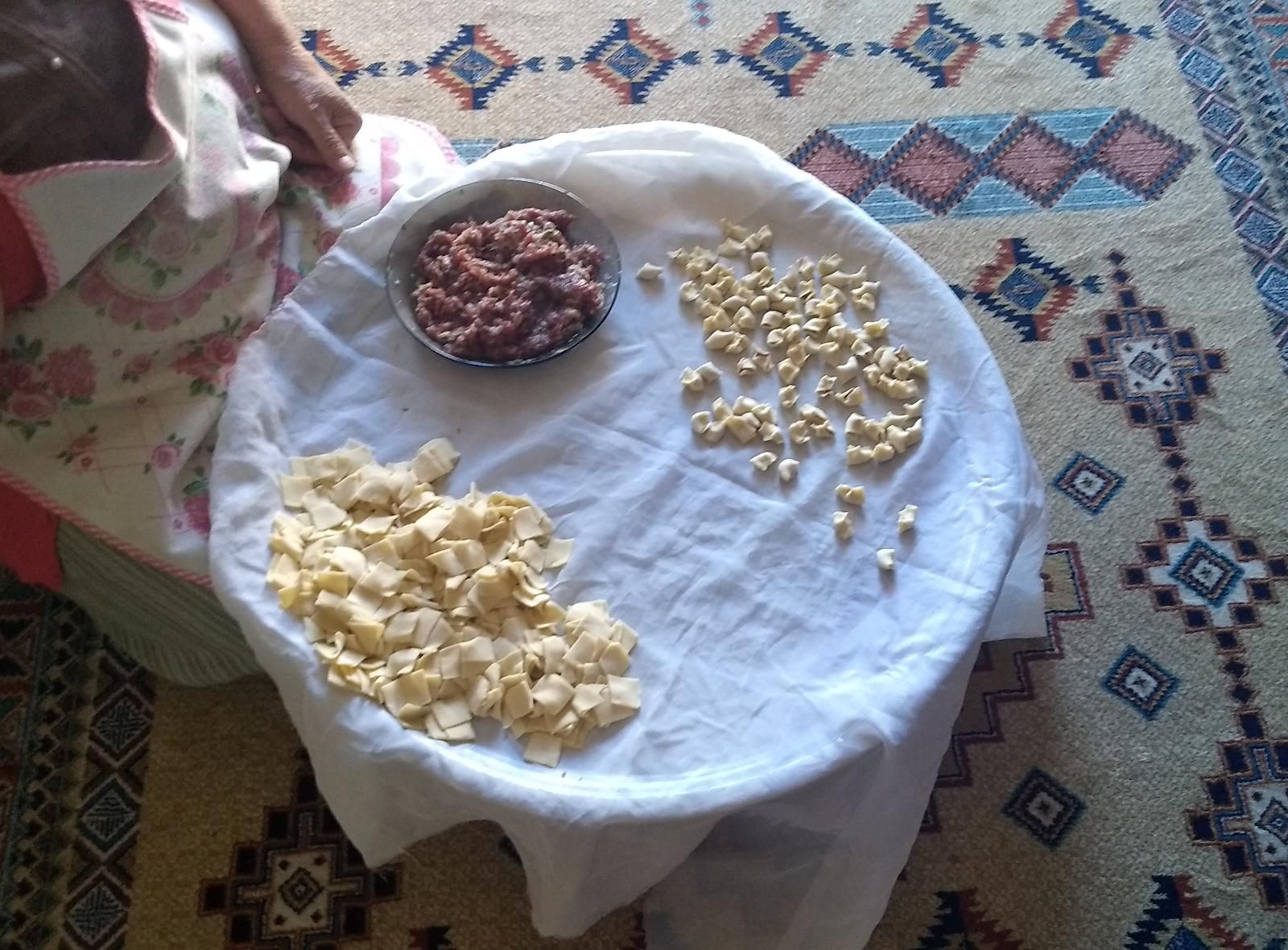
Turkish woman preparing Kayseri mantısı on a tray

=== In Bosnian cuisine ===
In Bosnian cuisine, the name klepe or kulaci is used. These are made of minced meat with onions. It is served in a sauce consisting of yogurt and garlic. There is also a separate dish called mantije, which is made of the same ingredients, but the pastry balls are put together with no free space in between and baked. After the baking yogurt is poured on top. This second type is similar to the dough of a pita or burek and is primarily made in the region of Sandžak, as well as in Kosovo.

== Terminology ==
The dish is known as manti in several languages (Armenian: մանթի, Azerbaijani: mantı, Kazakh: мәнті/mänti/مأنتى, Turkish: mantı, Uzbek: manti/monti). Other spelling varieties include manty (Kyrgyz, Tatar, Russian: манты), mantu (Pashto, Dari; Tajik: манту) or manta (Uyghur: مانتا, manta, monta, манта, монта), Mongolian- mantuu (мантуу).
