= Tatar böreği =

Turkish foodstuffs

- Place of origin: Turkey
- Region or state: Eskişehir, Gaziantep
- Main ingredients: Dough, yogurt, meat

Tatar böreği (Tatar börek) is a Turkish food consisting of dough parcels usually cut in the form of a triangle. It is a common food in many inner regions of Turkey in cities like Eskişehir and Gaziantep.

The dumplings are usually covered in yogurt and filled with ground beef, garlic and parsley. In North Cyprus they are traditionally served with grated halloumi cheese and mint.

In June 2018, Turkish President Recep Tayyip Erdogan stated that he would like to serve the dish in a series of cafes that he plans to create across Turkey, should he retain the Presidency following the June 2018 Presidential election.

== See also ==
- Öçpoçmaq - Tatar and Bashkir dumplings of triangular shape
- Manti (food)
