= Shoro (company) =

Beverage company in Kyrgyzstan

CSJC Shoro
- Native name: «Шоро» ЖАК
- Type: Private
- Industry: Beverage
- Founded: May 29, 1992; 34 years ago
- Founder: Taabaldy Egemberdiev; Jumadyl Egemberdiev
- Headquarters: Bishkek, Kyrgyzstan
- Areas served: Kyrgyzstan; Kazakhstan; Russia
- Products: Fermented Drinks (Maksym Shoro, Chalap Shoro, Aralash Shoro, Jarma Shoro, Tan Shoro, Kvass Shoro, Bozo Shoro); Bottled Water (Arashan, Baytik, Issyk Ata, Tien Shan Legend)
- Number of employees: 300 (Permanent); 1200 (During summer)
- Website: www.shoro.kg

CSJC Shoro is a beverage company based in Kyrgyzstan. It specialises in traditional national drinks such as maksym, chalap, jarma, and bozo, while also marketing other beverages including kvass and bottled water. Shoro products are widely available across the country, both in retail stores as bottled drinks, and through bazaars and street side mobile stands. These mobile stands are particularly prevalent during warmer summer months and are frequently staffed by women affectionately known by locals as "Shoro Aunties (Шоро-эжешки)".

Enesay is Shoro's primary competitor, offering a comparable range of traditional beverages through similar street side mobile stands as well. Over the years, Shoro has expanded its market presence beyond Kyrgyzstan, exporting its products primarily to neighbouring Kazakhstan and Russia. The company has expressed intentions to further broaden its international footprint by entering additional markets, including Uzbekistan and Pakistan.

== History ==
Founded on 29 May 1992 by the Egemberdiev family, Shoro began by selling its first 80 litres of maksym at Dordoy Bazaar, with the entire supply reportedly sold out within two hours. In 1999, the company expanded its product range with the introduction of bottled water. Until 2000, its fermented beverages were home brewed in a workshop with 20 cauldrons. To meet growing demand, Shoro subsequently acquired a 500sqm factory for approximately KGS 1 million, significantly increasing its production capacity.

In 2013, the company commissioned an automated bottling line, replacing the manual filling process that had been used since bottled products were first introduced in 1998. The following year, Keldibek Tumanov, the owner of the Kelechek company, acquired a 19.2% stake in Shoro. Afterwhich, in 2015, the company sold an additional 14% of the shareholding for KGS 33 million to an undisclosed investor.

In 2022, Shoro's revenue surpassed KGS 1 billion. Since then, the company has been investing in new equipment and expanding its production facilities to increase manufacturing capacity. It aims to capture 20% of the domestic sweet beverage market, and raise annual beverage production to 10 million litres.

== Products and brands ==
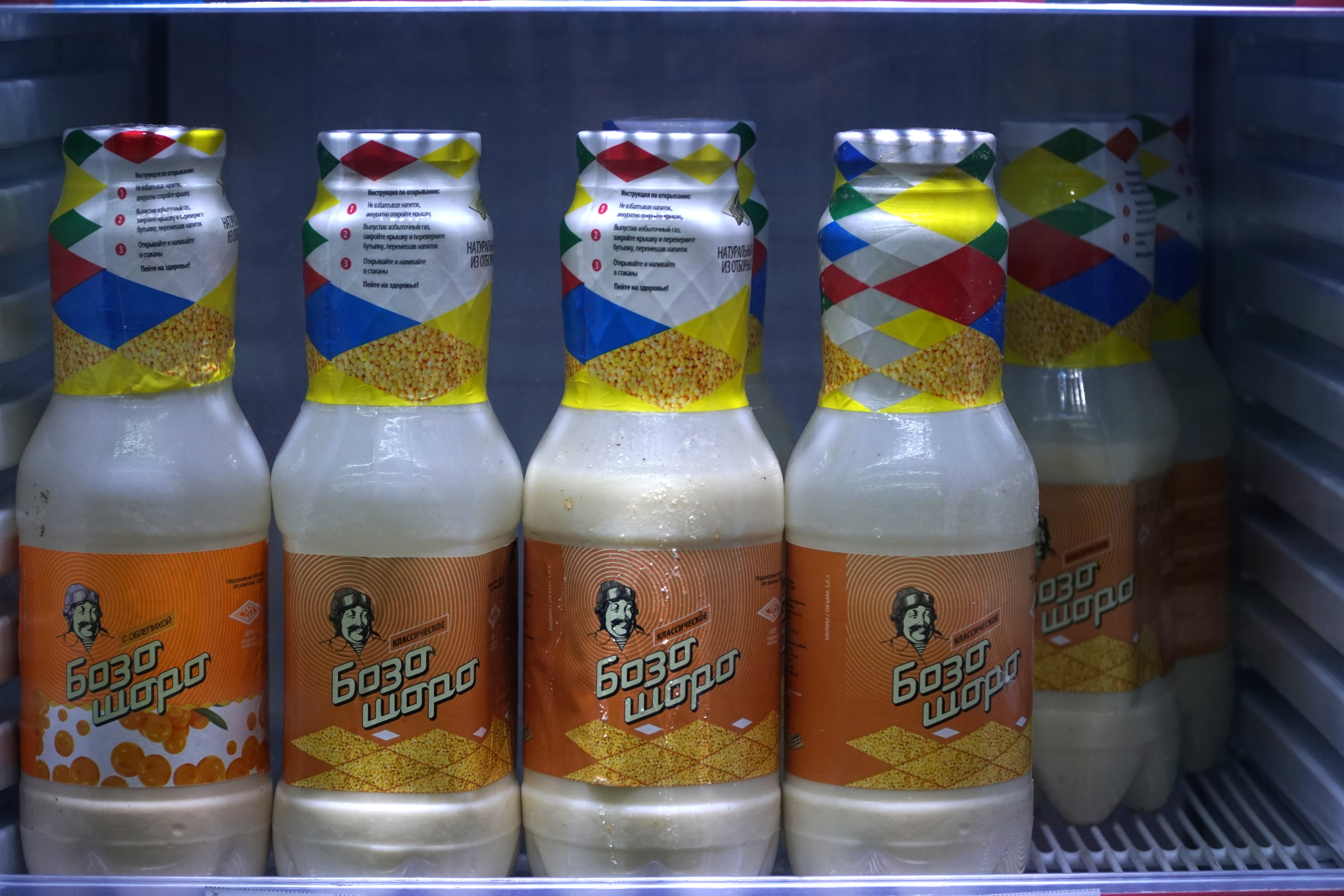
Bozo Shoro sold in bottles

=== Fermented Drinks ===
As of 2026, Shoro sells seven varieties of fermented drinks, namely:

- Maksym Shoro (Kyrgyz: Максым Шоро)
  A fermented grains drink
- Chalap Shoro (Kyrgyz: Чалап Шоро)
  A salty fermented yoghurt drink
- Aralash Shoro (Kyrgyz: Аралаш Шоро)
  A mixed blend of Maksym and Chalap drink
- Jarma Shoro (Kyrgyz: Жарма Шоро)
  A mildly fermented grains drink
- Tan Shoro (Kyrgyz: Таң Шоро)
  A mildly fermented yoghurt drink
- Kvass Shoro (Kyrgyz: Квас Шоро)
  A rye-bread fermented drink
- Bozo Shoro (Kyrgyz: Бозо Шоро)
  A mildly alcoholic fermented ale drink

=== Bottled Water ===
Shoro also sells 4 brands of bottled water, which are named after the different regions within Kyrgyzstan, namely:

- Arashan
- Baytik
- Issyk Ata
- Tien Shan Legend

== Sponsorship ==
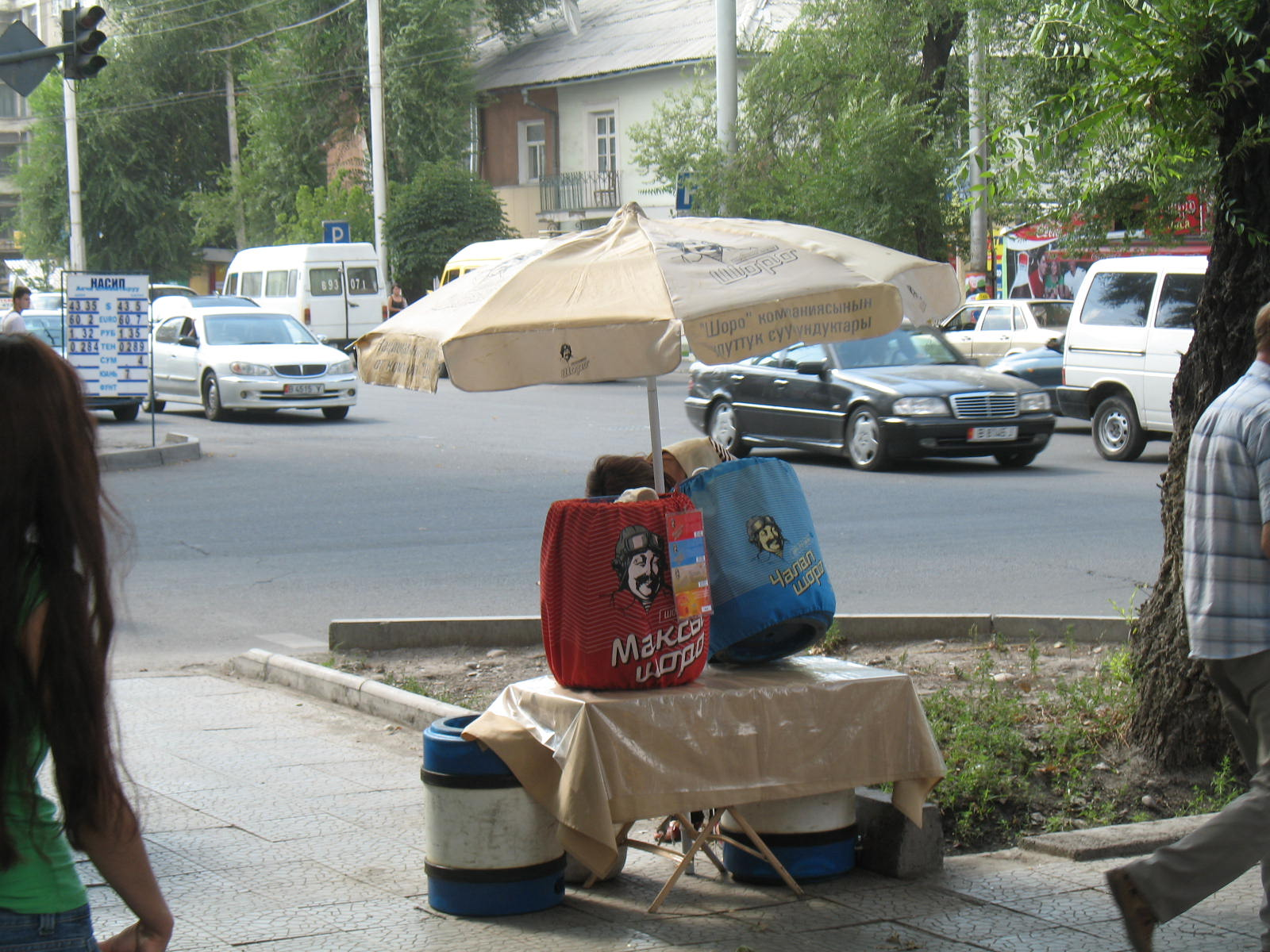
Shoro products being sold on a street corner in downtown Bishkek.

Shoro has sponsored a number of major events and sporting initiatives in Kyrgyzstan. Most recently, the company served as an official partner of the World Nomad Games. It was also the principal sponsor of the now defunct FC Shoro Bishkek, which competed in the Kyrgyz Higher League. In addition, through its Tien Shan Legend water brand, Shoro has served as the official water sponsor of the Kyrgyzstan national football team.

== Criticism ==
Shoro has faced scrutiny over rising product prices in recent years, with the cost of some beverages doubling between 2021 and 2024. The price increases have attracted public attention and prompted inquiries from the Kyrgyzstan Antimonopoly Regulation Service. The company stated that the increases were driven by higher production and operating costs, including those linked to the broader economic impacts of the Russo-Ukrainian War.
