= Qatiq =

Turkic fermented milk product

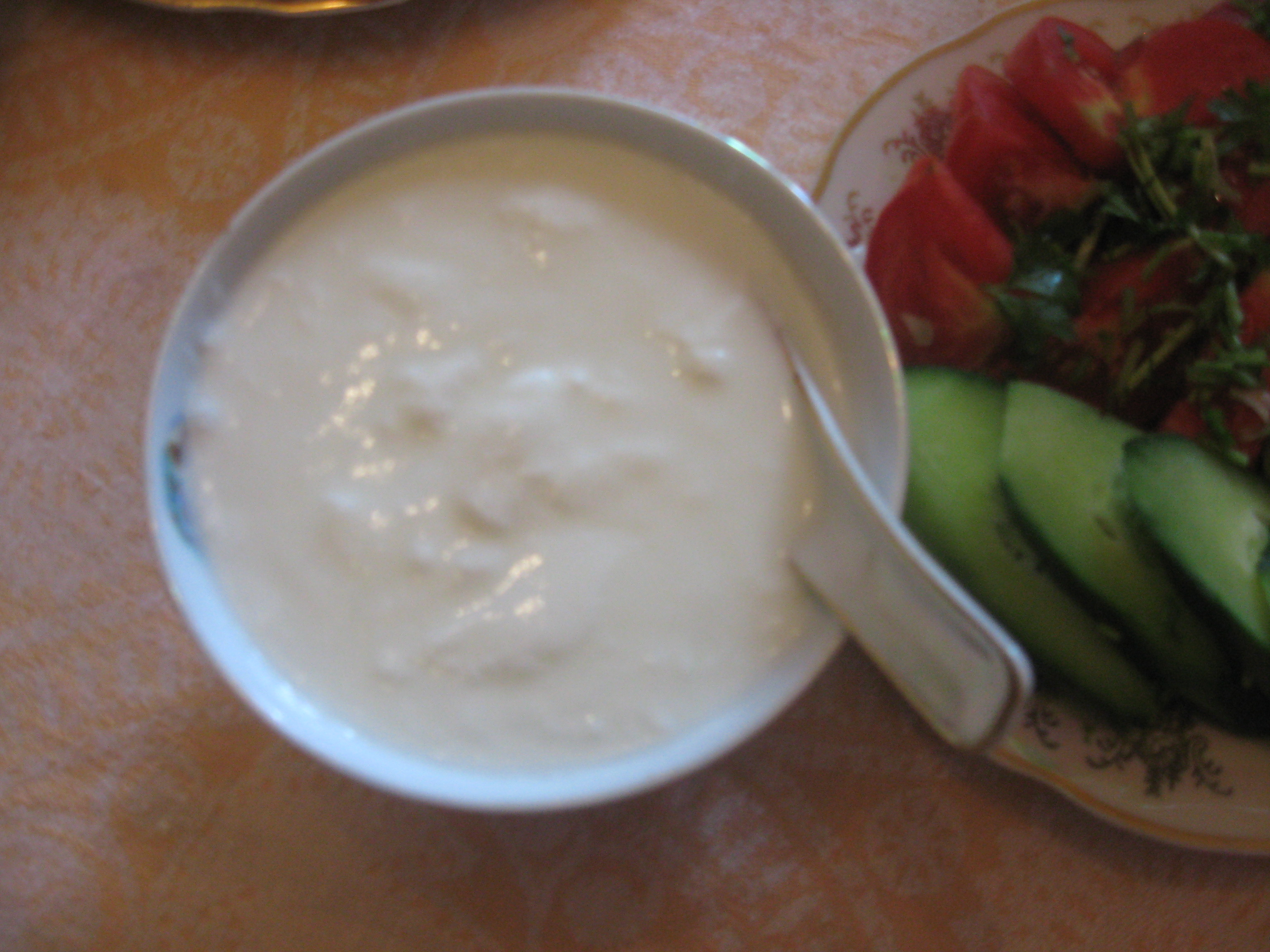
Qatiq from Azerbaijan

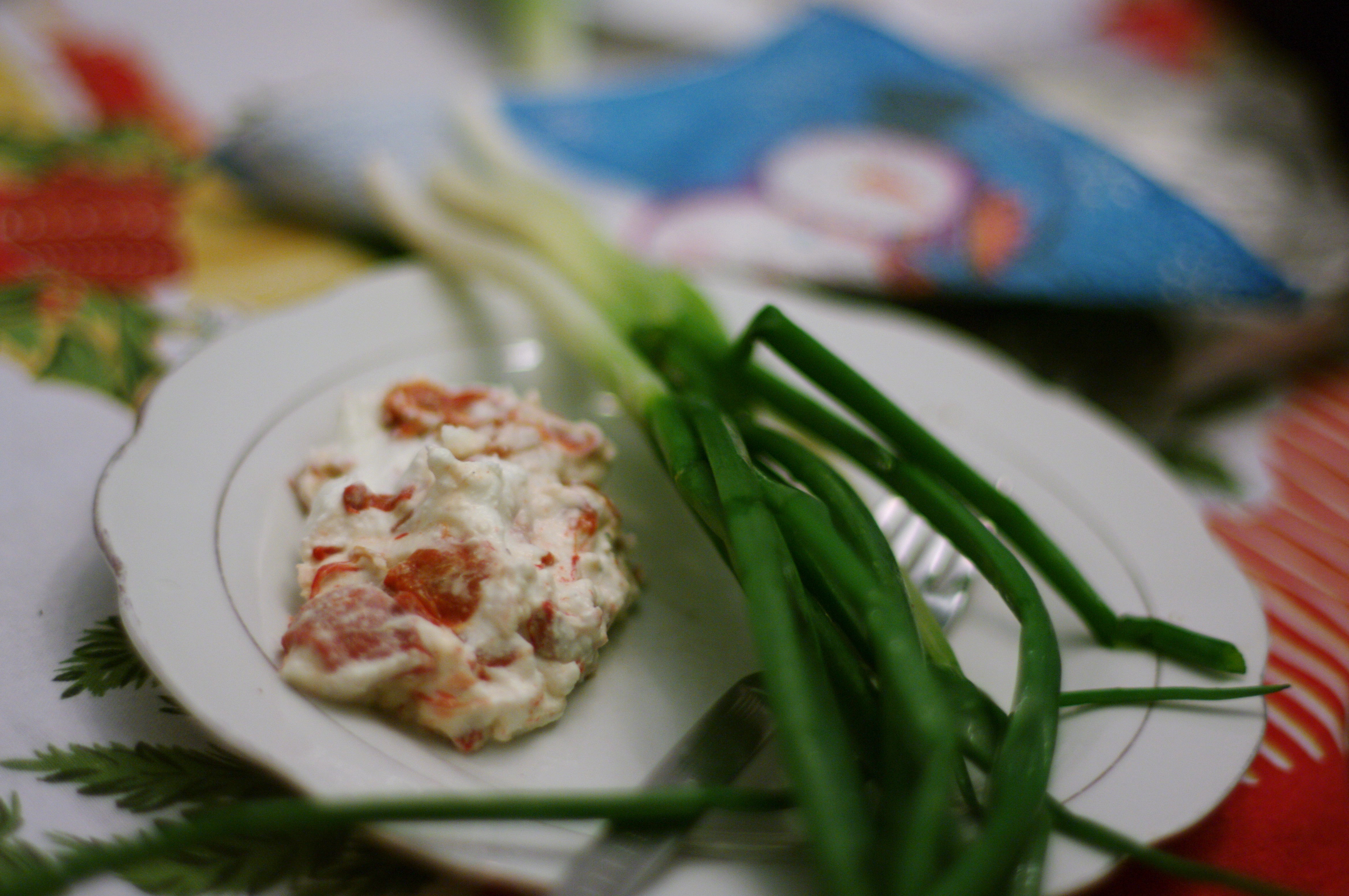
Bulgarian qatiq

Qatiq is a fermented milk product from the Turkic countries and Bulgaria. It is a more solid form of yogurt than ayran.

In order to make qatiq, boiled milk is fermented for 6–10 hours in a warm place. Sometimes red beets or cherries are used for colouring. The product may be kept in a cool place for two or three days. If stored longer, it will turn sour; it may still be added to high-fat soups, though. The chalop soup is made from qatiq in Uzbekistan.

When sour milk is strained in a canvas bag, the resulting product is called suzma. Dried suzma, or kurut, is often rolled into marble-sized balls.

In Bulgaria, katǎk is a spread that has the consistency of mayonnaise.

== See also ==
- Cacık – a cognate name applied to another dish in Turkey and some neighbouring countries
- List of dairy products
- List of yogurt-based dishes and beverages
