= Chalap =

Central Asian beverage

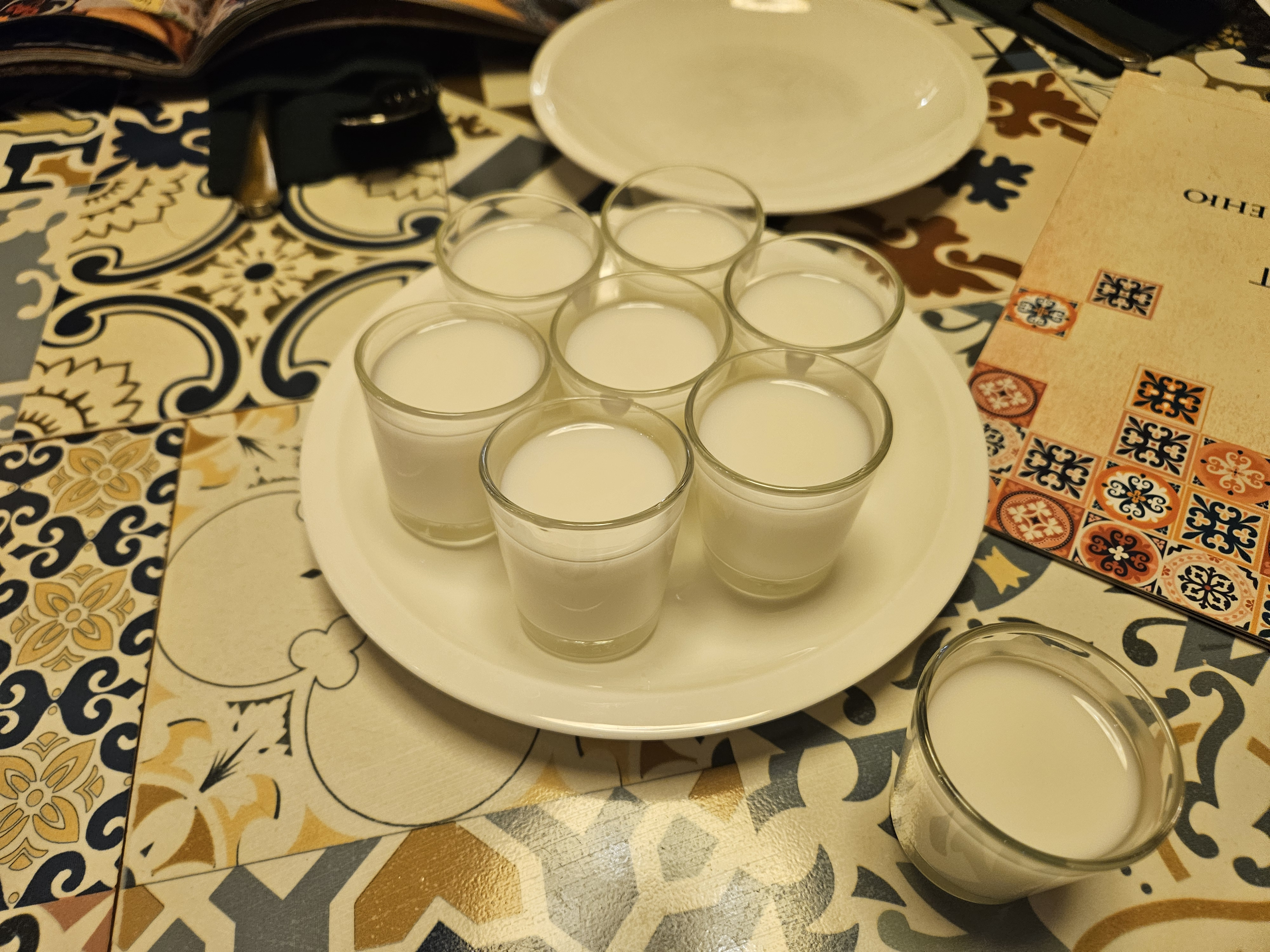
- Chalap is served in Almaty, Kazakhstan
- Type: Beverage
- Manufacturer: Shoro
- Origin: Kyrgyzstan and Kazakhstan
- Ingredients: Qatiq or suzma, salt, carbonated water

Chalap, (Note: Kyrgyz: чалап, pronounced [t͡ɕʰɑɫɑ́p]; Uzbek: chalob, pronounced [t͡ʃʰæˈlɒp]; Kazakh: шалап, romanized: şalap, pronounced [ʃɑɫɑ́p]) also marketed as Tan, is a beverage common to Kyrgyzstan, Uzbekistan, and Kazakhstan. It consists of qatiq or suzma, salt, and in modern times, carbonated water.

The Shoro beverage company markets chalap as "Chalap Shoro" (Kyrgyz: Чалап Шоро).

In Uzbekistan, chalap is part of rural culture, originating from nomadic traditions. In Uzbek cuisine, it includes vegetables, giving it the appearance of a cold soup.

== See also ==
- Ayran
- Doogh
- Tahn
