= Kalduny =

Type of dumplings in Balto-Slavic cuisines

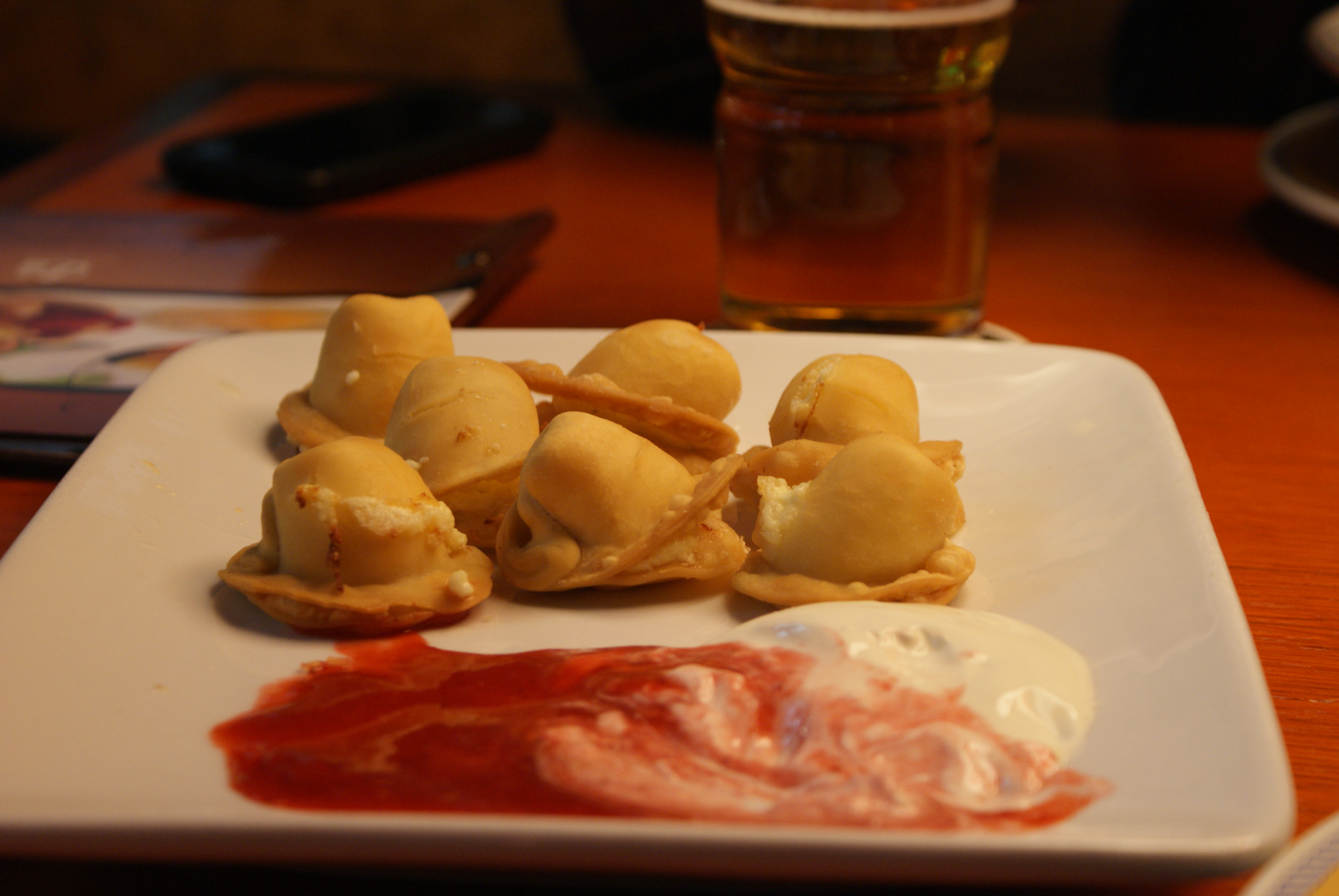
- Koldūnai in Lithuania
- Type: Dumpling
- Place of origin: Polish–Lithuanian Commonwealth
- Main ingredients: Unleavened dough (flour mixed with tepid water, eggs, salt); meat, mushrooms, or other filling

Kalduny or kolduny (Belarusian: калдуны́, Polish: kołduny, Lithuanian: koldūnai) are dumplings stuffed with meat, mushrooms or other ingredients, made in Belarusian, Lithuanian, and Polish cuisines, akin to the Polish pierogi, Russian pelmeni and the Ukrainian varenyky.

In Slavic languages the word means “magicians” or “sorcerers”, but it is unclear how the word became associated with the dish.

== Description ==
Kalduny, dumplings of unleavened dough filled with meat, mushrooms, or other stuffings, are related to similar dishes in the West and in the East alike, from Italian ravioli, Hungarian derelye, and Ashkenazi Jewish pirogen to Russian pelmeni and Central Asian manti or chuchvara. Kalduny made with a stuffing of smoked ham and mushrooms (Kalduny Count Tyshkevich, named after a Belarusian noble family from Lahojsk near Minsk) were long considered Belarus's “visiting card”, although decades of Soviet rule almost erased their trace from public memory and now they are only served in a few local restaurants. Currently the Russian pelmeni and the Ukrainian vareniki are served in more restaurants.

The simplest dough for kalduny is made of flour mixed with tepid water, eggs, and some salt. In some recipes the dough for kalduny is mixed with onion juice, not water. Kalduny dough should be soft but elastic, easy to stretch and to seal into a pocket around a dollop of filling. Like other pastry doughs, it has to be allowed to rest, covered with a dish towel or a cloth so as not to dry out. Kalduny are usually boiled in a big shallow casserole at low heat, in well-salted water. Instead of boiling in water, kalduny may be boiled directly in a soup, in which they are then served. Some varieties are baked or fried. Polesie-style kalduny, with a stuffing of boiled river fish and hard-boiled eggs, are fried. A variety known in Russian cuisine as kundyumy (Russian: кундюмы) is never boiled: the mushroom-filled dumplings are baked in a crock pot in the oven or fried.

Kalduny may be served as a main course or a dessert, depending on the stuffing. For the former, meat, mushrooms, farmer cheese, or fish are used; for the latter, fresh berries or sometimes dried fruits may be used. The sauce or topping for kalduny also depends on the stuffing. Kalduny with Vilnius stuffing (mushrooms and smoked pork, as in Kalduny Count Tyshkevich) are topped with melted butter, while those filled with Russian stuffing (farmer cheese or mashed potatoes) are usually paired with thick sour cream. Dessert kalduny are powdered with cinnamon or topped with fruit syrups. Kalduny are often served in a soup (beef broth or borsht), similarly to Jewish kreplach. The numerous combinations of dough, stuffing, and sauce provide a great potential for variation.

Large kalduny (manti) are prepared for the major Muslim feasts, which are celebrated by the Tatar population that has lived continuously in Belarus since the end of the 14th century. This variety of kalduny are made with spiced mutton or veal stuffing and are eaten by spoon, so that the dough wrapping doesn't tear and the juice from inside is not lost.

== Varieties of kalduny ==
Kalduny come with a variety of fillings:

- Meat (ground or chopped)
- Mushrooms (fresh or dried)
- Mushrooms and smoked pork, mixed in equal proportions (Vilnius stuffing, Kalduny Count Tyshkevich)
- White rice and hard-boiled eggs
- Sautéed sauerkraut with mushrooms
- Fish (freshwater fish, such as pike or pike-perch, boned and chopped, mixed with hard-boiled or fried eggs)
- Bilberry (whole)
- Cherry (stoned)

== See also ==
- Colțunași, a Romanian kind of dumplings
