= Pelmeni =

Russian dumplings

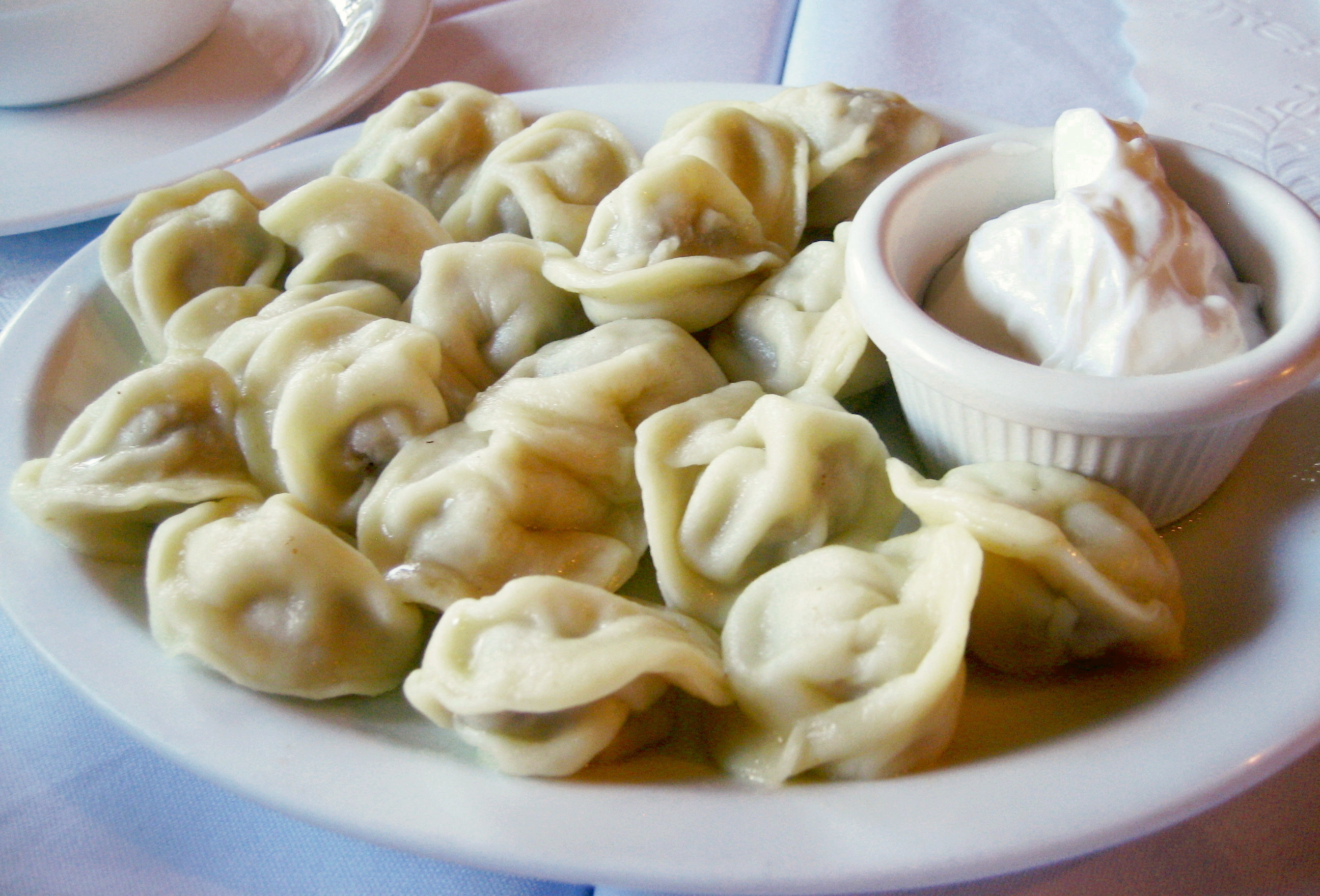
- Pelmeni served with smetana (sour cream)
- Type: Dumpling
- Place of origin: Russia
- Main ingredients: Dough: flour, water, sometimes eggs Filling: minced meat (pork, lamb, beef, fish, or any other kind of meat) or mushrooms as well as salt, pepper and sometimes herbs and onions.

Pelmeni (Russian: пельмени, pronounced [pʲɪlʲˈmʲenʲɪ]; sing. pelmen, пельмень, pronounced [pʲɪlʲˈmʲenʲ]) are dumplings of Russian cuisine that consist of a filling wrapped in thin, unleavened dough. They are considered a national dish.

Pelmeni became a staple of Russian cuisine during the period of Russian expansion into the Ural Mountains and Siberia. Pelmeni also have deep roots in the traditions and folklore of the regions of Komi and Udmurtia in Russia, and figure prominently in Komi and Udmurt cuisine. The name itself was borrowed from the languages of the Komi and Udmurts.

== Description ==
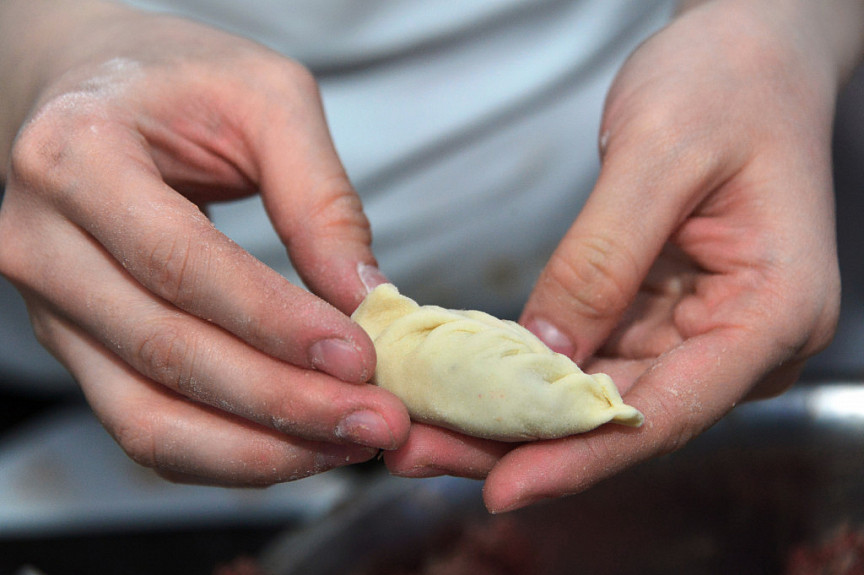
Modeling pelmeni. Buryatia, Russia

The dough is made from flour and water, sometimes adding a small portion of eggs.

Pelmeni can be served in several ways; for example, they can be cooked in stock, or they can be cooked consommé and served in a bowl with soup. Pelmeni can be served as a main dish for lunch or dinner, either smothered in butter or prepared Siberian-style, which involves sprinkling them with vinegar and adding freshly ground pepper for extra flavor.

The filling can be minced meat (pork, lamb, beef, fish or any other kind of meat, venison being particularly traditional for colder regions) or mushrooms, or a combination of the two. The mixing together of different kinds of meat is also popular. In European Russia, ground beef is used and mushroom-filled pelmeni are also accepted. The traditional Udmurt recipe requires a mixture of 45% beef, 35% mutton, and 20% pork. Various spices, such as black pepper and diced onions as well as garlic, are mixed into the filling. They are commonly topped with sour cream, mayonnaise, dill, red onions or vinegar, all of which are traditional to the region and can be produced in the Siberian climate.

Adding small amounts of cabbage, tomato and horseradish into the mince is also common for certain regional recipes.

Temperature and humidity have considerable impact on dough consistency and stability.

=== Similar dishes ===
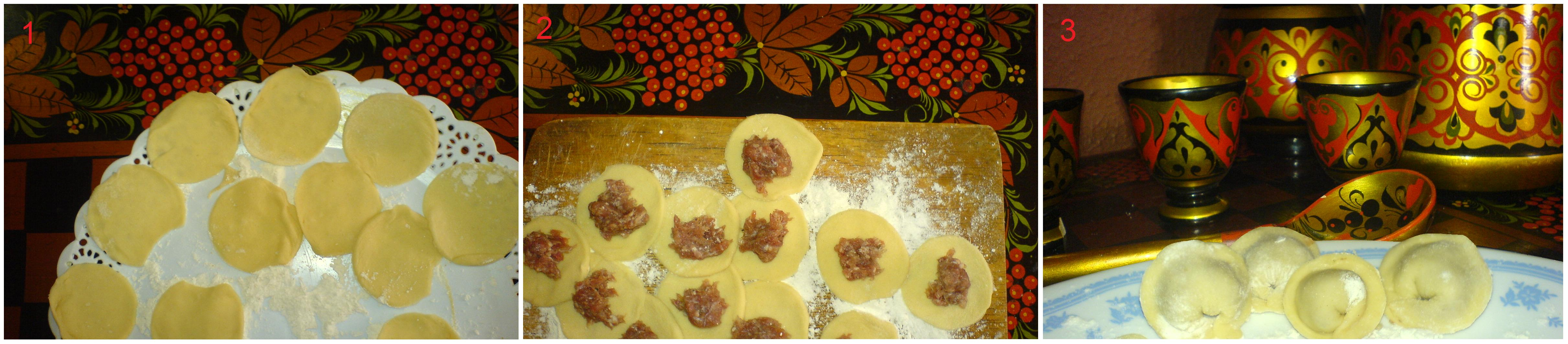
Preparation of pelmeni

Pelmeni belong to the family of dumplings, and resemble the Polish uszka/ushka (Polish: [ˈuʂka]) also known in Belarus as vuški (Belarusian: вушкі [ˈvuʂkʲi]), and vushka in western Ukraine (Ukrainian: вушка [ˈwuʃkɐ]). Uszka literally mean 'little ears'.

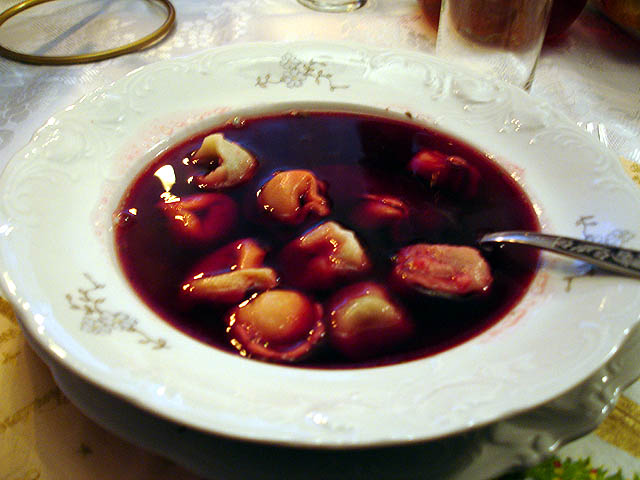
Traditional Christmas Eve Polish Uszka

In the United States and Canada, the term pierogi or pierogies is often used to describe all kinds of Eastern European dumplings, regardless of the shape, size, or filling. Pelmeni are also similar to Mongolian bansh, Chinese jiaozi (Cantonese gaau) or Chinese húntún (Cantonese wonton). They are cousins to the Armenian, Turkish and Kazakh manti, the Georgian khinkali, the Nepalese and Tibetan momo, the Uyghur and Uzbek chuchvara, the Korean mandu, the Japanese gyoza, the Italian tortellini and ravioli, and Swabian Maultaschen. Somewhat similar are the fried or baked empanadas encountered in Hispanic-influenced cultures.

The most important difference between pelmeni, varenyky, and pierogi is the thickness of the dough shell—in pelmeni and vareniki this is as thin as possible, and the proportion of filling to dough is usually higher. Pelmeni are never served with a sweet filling, which distinguishes them from vareniki and Polish pierogi, which sometimes are. Also, the fillings in pelmeni are usually raw, while the fillings of vareniki and pierogi are typically precooked.

The main difference between pelmeni and momos is their size—a typical pelmen is about two to three centimetres (3/4–1 1/4 in) in diameter, whereas momos are often at least twice that size.

=== Regional differences ===
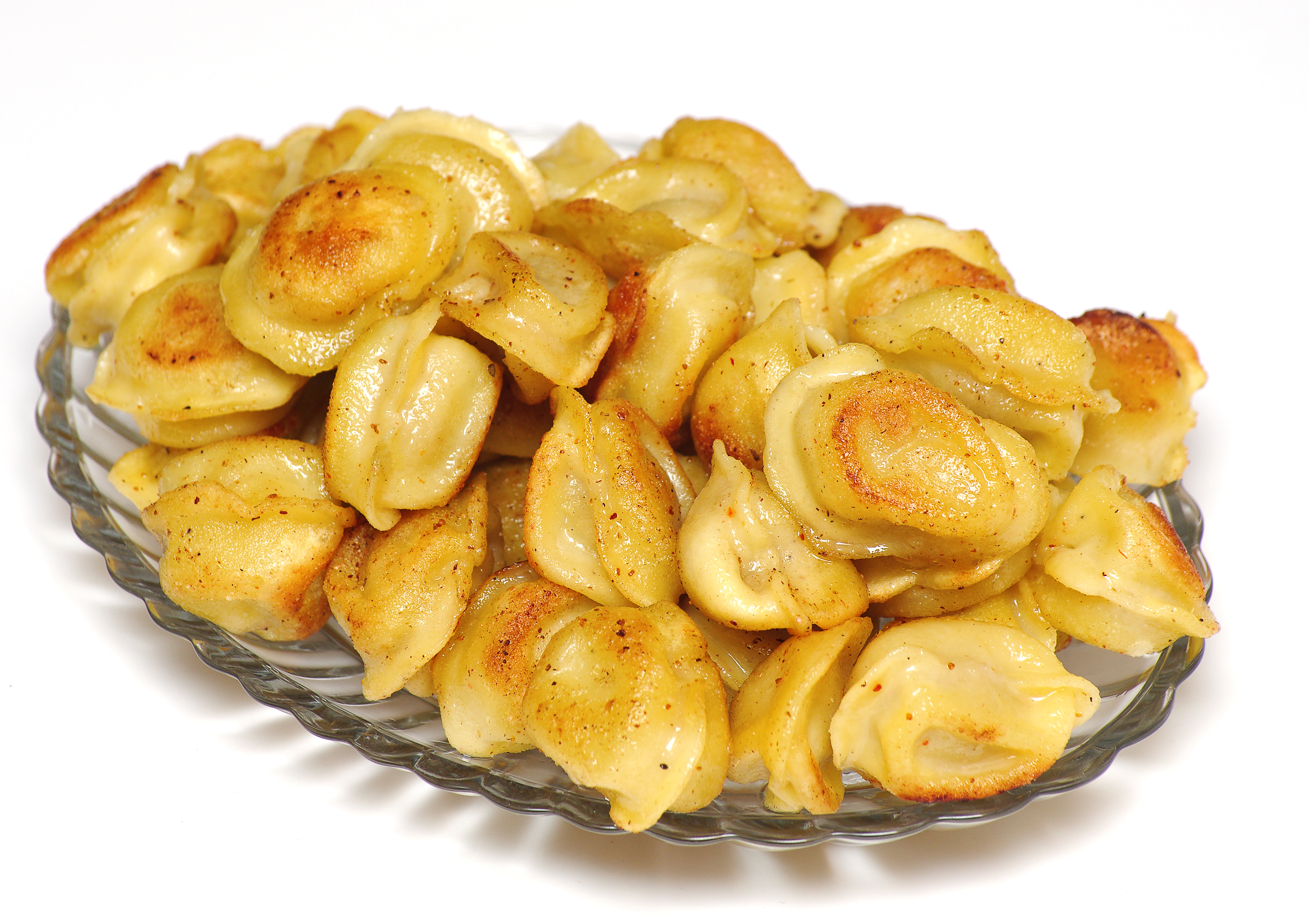
Fried pelmeni

In Siberia, pelmeni are traditionally frozen outdoors in the winter and treated as preserved food. Hunters or explorers heading into the taiga would carry sacks of frozen pelmeni with their provisions since they can be stored frozen for a long time and are easily cooked.

Pelmeni are prepared immediately before eating by boiling in salted water until they float, and then two to five minutes more. In the Urals, they are boiled in plain water, while in Siberia they are boiled in salted water or sometimes meat or chicken broth. The cooked pelmeni are served alone or topped with melted butter or smetana (sour cream), as well as condiments like mustard, horseradish, tomato sauce, and vinegar. In the Russian Far East, they generally add soy sauce.

There are many traditional recipes, some of them suggest frying pelmeni after boiling until they turn golden brown. Pelmeni can also be served in a clear soup, although in Siberia this is considered in poor taste and pelmeni are carefully strained before serving. In Tatar cuisine, pilmän (the Tatar equivalent of pelmeni) are a traditional dish, where they have always been served with clear soup and added dill or other freshly cut herbs.

Packed frozen, pelmeni can be found in ethnic Russian and Ukrainian food stores everywhere. Packets of frozen pelmeni, like those carried on the taiga, are usually labeled "Siberian pelmeni". Store-bought pelmeni are made on industrial machinery, much of which is made by Italian companies such as Arienti and Cattaneo, Ima, Ostoni, Zamboni, etc. These pelmeni usually weigh around 15 grams (1/2 oz) each and look like a larger version of tortellini, which is why, for industrial production, Italian pasta machines are commonly used. Pelmeni are also commonly made at home. The easiest (if somewhat laborious) way is simply to make them by hand; many cooks use specialized "pelmeni makers" (Russian: пельменница, pelmennitsa), which are essentially molds that resemble muffin pans or ravioli molds, allowing one to quickly make a few dozen pelmeni out of two sheets of dough and a quantity of ground meat.

In Russia, store-bought pelmeni are considered a kind of convenience food associated with students' or bachelors' lifestyles, much like instant ramen in the West, while home-made pelmeni are considered hearty, healthy food. Store-bought frozen pelmeni, including those catered for the Russian émigré community, are therefore only remotely related and fail to capture the qualities of the original dish.

== History ==
The word pelmeni is derived from pel'n'an' (пельнянь), literally "ear bread" in the Finno-Ugric Komi and Udmurt languages. Alternatively, it is literally translated as "dough ears".

The origins of pelmeni are contested, but they are widely viewed as a Siberian contribution to Russian cuisine. One theory suggests pelmeni, or stuffed boiled dumplings in general, originated in Siberia, possibly a simplified adaptation of the Chinese jiaozi (in some dialects it is called Bāomiàn "包麵/包面"). This theory is corroborated by the fact that traditional pelmeni fillings are strongly flavored with black pepper and other spices that are not native to Russia. Therefore, pelmeni may have been carried by the Mongols from China to Siberia and the Urals. Another theory is that they originated in the Urals and were then spread to Central Asia by Russian explorers and pioneers. Pelmeni may have also been developed by hunters, who needed food that was light and easy to prepare in order to be able to take with them on hunting trips.

In a Kungur census book from 1679, surnames derived from the dish begin to appear, such as Pelmenev (Russian: Пельменев) and Pelnenev (Russian: Пельненев). Therefore, the dish has probably existed in the Urals for several centuries. The dish may have spread from the Urals to Siberia through Russian transport routes running through the modern Perm Krai and Udmurtia. The dish gained popularity in Siberia, evident by contemporary writings and works of art. When pelmeni entered the national Russian consciousness in the 19th century, in part thanks to improved transportation connecting different regions of the nation, they were often called Siberian pelmeni.

Before pelmeni entered the broader all-Russian cuisine, it was largely a regional dish confined to the Urals and Siberia. Dumplings, however, were not a new addition to Russian cuisine prior to pelmeni. As early as the 16th century, documents like the Domostroy referenced the old Russian dumpling dish kundyumy (Russian: кундюмы). The dish kundyumy was largely forgotten after the 17th century, with one of its only surviving recipes included in the works of Vasily Lyovshin in the early 19th century, where it is described as a lenten dumpling dish with a mushroom and rice filling that was baked with mushroom broth. Interestingly, the name ushki (Russian: ушки) was considered synonymous with kundyumy by Lyovshin, and the name ushki to denote dumplings became more prevalent into the 19th century. Not unlike the etymology for pelmeni in the Permian languages, ushki derives from "ear" in the Russian language. Recipes for ushki during this period eventually evolved to include a variety of meat and fish fillings as well, in conjunction with the rising popularity of pelmeni. Interestingly, ushki also survived among the Komi people in certain localities by the names ushkiez (ушкиэз) or peliez (пелиэз) as a dumpling with mushroom filling.

Pelmeni began to appear in restaurants in late 19th-century France at a time when Russian dishes had already made a considerable impact on haute cuisine. Auguste Escoffier included them as a hot hors d'oeuvre in Le Guide Culinaire, which was contrary to the Russian custom.

== Culture ==
In the historical homelands of pelmeni in the Urals and Siberia, the dish became an important part of festivities and rituals among the Permians, Russians, and Turkic peoples living there. Over time, the dish has become important for people across Russia and the Post-Soviet states.

Pelmeni hold an important place in Russian and Udmurt culture. In Izhevsk, the capital of Udmurtia, a monument dedicated to pelmeni has been erected, symbolizing the dish's cultural significance. Udmurtia also celebrates an annual gastronomic festival called "World Pelmen Day", which brings together traditional pelmeni recipes from across Russia and highlights the dish's importance to the region.

== See also ==
- Kreplach
- Wonton
- Manti
- List of dumplings
- List of Russian dishes
- Komi cuisine

== Sources ==
- Gallani, Barbara (15 May 2015). Dumplings: A Global History. Reaktion Books. ISBN 978-1-78023-433-5.
- Goldstein, Darra (24 May 2022). The Kingdom of Rye: A Brief History of Russian Food. Univ of California Press. ISBN 978-0-520-38390-6.
- Volokh, Anne; Manus, Mavis (1989). The Art of Russian Cuisine. Collier Books. ISBN 978-0-02-038102-0.
