= Pierogi =

Stuffed Polish dumplings

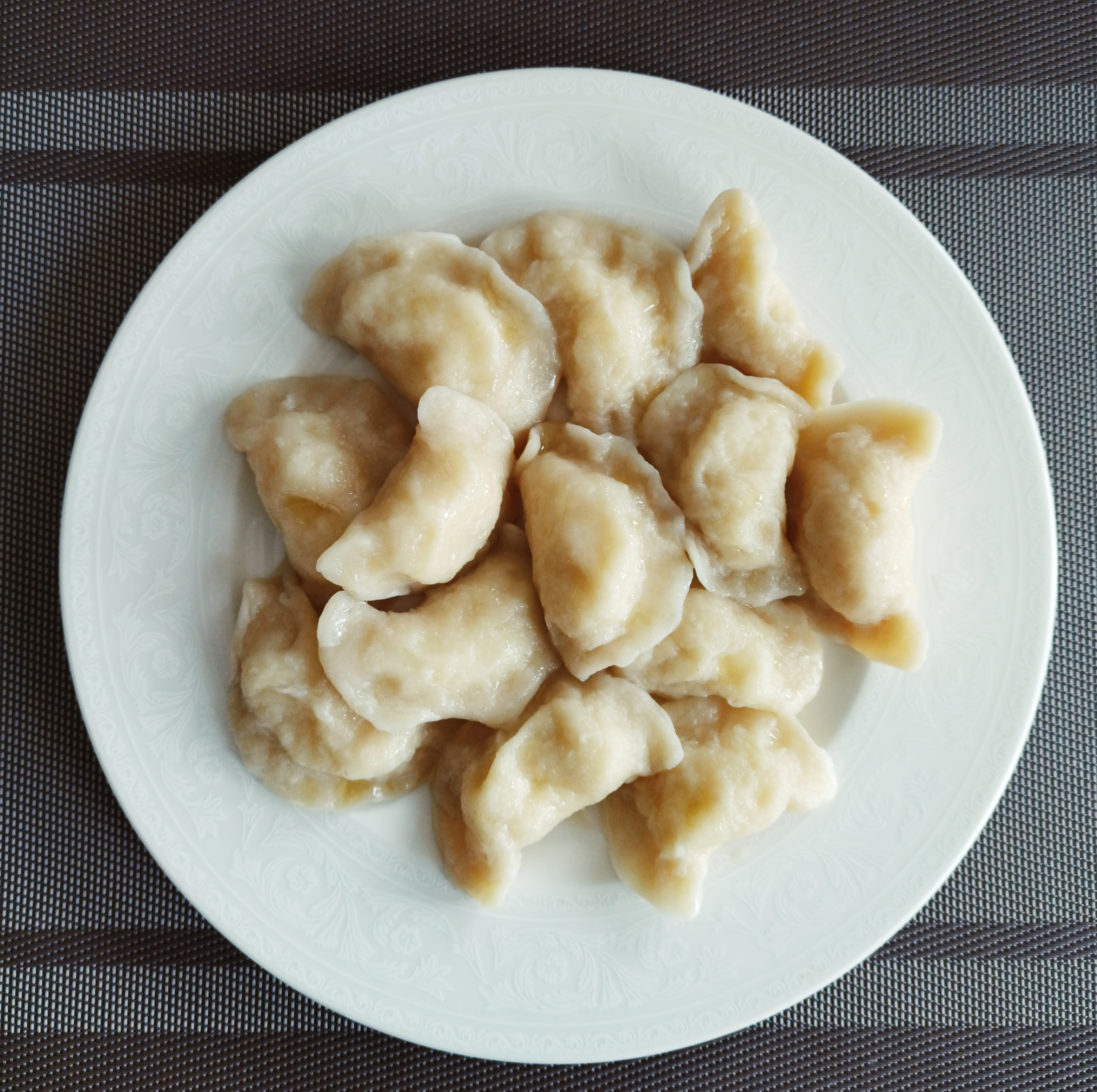
- Pierogi with butter
- Alternative names: Perogie, pyrohy
- Type: Dumplings
- Course: Appetizer, main, dessert
- Place of origin: Poland
- Associated cuisine: Poland, Central Europe, Canada, and United States (as pierogi)
- Main ingredients: Dough: flour, eggs; Filling: various
- Variations: Savory: pierogi ruskie from Poland (twaróg with potato and onion), pierogi z mięsem (meat pierogi), pierogi z kapustą i grzybami and bryndzové pirohy; Sweet: with sweet quark cheese or fruits (usually strawberries or blueberries), often accompanied by cream, pastry sauces or sweet breadcrumbs mixed in butter
- Similar dishes: Uszka, maultasche, pelmeni, kreplach, manti, jiaozi

Pierogi (/pɪˈroʊɡi/ pirr-OH-ghee; Polish: [pjɛˈrɔɡʲi], sing. pieróg [ˈpjɛruk]) are filled dumplings made by wrapping unleavened dough around a filling and cooking in boiling water. They are occasionally flavored with a savory or sweet garnish. Typical fillings include potato and tvorog cheese, sauerkraut, ground meat, mushrooms, fruits, or berries. Savory pierogi are often served with a topping of sour cream, fried onions, or both.

Dumplings under the name pierogi are a traditional Polish dish, holding considerable culinary significance in Poland. The recipe itself dates back to at least 1682, when Poland's first cookbook, Compendium ferculorum, albo Zebranie potraw, was published. Pierogi are also popular in modern-day Canadian and American cuisines.

== Terminology ==
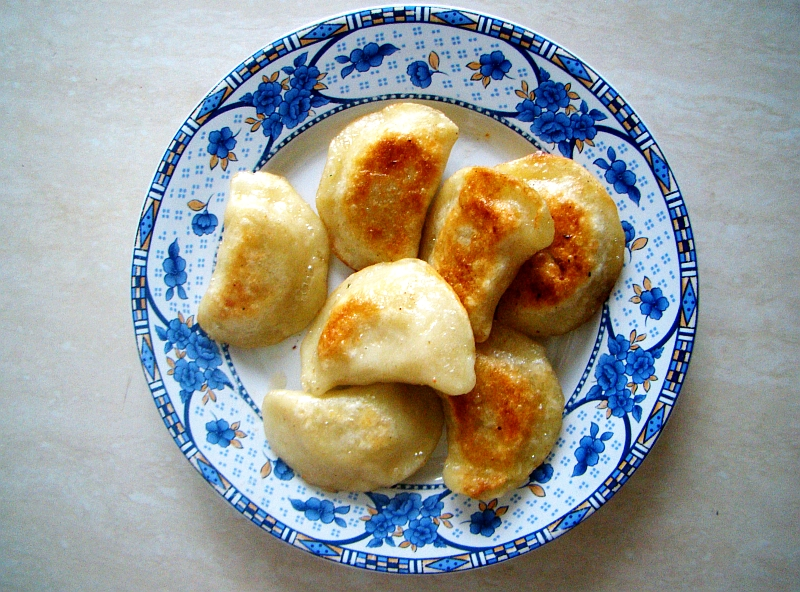
Traditional Christmas Eve pierogi, whose name is derived from a root meaning 'festival'

The Polish word pierogi is the plural form of pieróg, a generic term for one filled dumpling. It derives from Proto-Slavic *pirъ, 'feast'. While dumplings as such are found throughout Eurasia, the specific name pierogi, with its Proto-Slavic root and its cognates in the West and East Slavic languages, including Russian пирог (pirog, 'pie') and пирожки (pirozhki, 'small pies'), shows the name's common Slavic origins, antedating the modern nation states and their standardized languages. In most of these languages the word means 'pie'. However, a recent theory speculates that the words bierock, pierogi or pirog may be derived from Turkic bureg.

In Ukrainian cuisine, the term varenyky (вареники, singular varenyk) refers to a related but distinct type of filled dumpling rather than a Ukrainian name for pierogi. Varenyky are traditionally boiled, but in some Ukrainian regions they may also be steamed (parenі varenyky), a preparation method not typical for pierogi. The word varenyky is the plural form of вареник (varenyk), deriving from Ukrainian вар (var) meaning "boiling liquid", indicating boiling as the primary cooking method for this category of dumplings.

The same term and its variants are also used in the Mennonite tradition, where spellings such as varenikie or wareniki appear. In Canadian Doukhobor Russian variations are called and spelled pyrahi, pirozhki, and vareniki.

Bryndzové pirohy is the Slovak term for dumplings filled with sheep milk cheese.

Colțunași is the Romanian term for filled dumplings. It is derived from Greek καλτσούνι, kaltsúni, itself a borrowing from Italian calzoni. A similarly named type of dumpling related to, or considered a variety of, pierogi, is known in Belarus as калдуны́, in Lithuania as Virtiniai-koldūnai, and in Poland as kołduny.

== Origins ==
Because the exact origin of the pierogi is unknown and unverifiable, it is the subject of frequent debate. Dumplings most likely originated in China and became widespread in Europe during the Middle Ages or later periods. Some claim that pierogi were spread by Marco Polo's expeditions through the Silk Road, thus suggesting a connection to Chinese mantou. Other sources theorize that in the 13th century, pierogi were brought by Saint Hyacinth of Poland from the Far East (Asia) via what was then the Kievan Rus'. These became characteristic to Central and East European cuisines, where different varieties (preparation methods, ingredients, fillings) were invented. According to another theory, the dish was adopted in the territories of contemporary Ukraine from Turks, whose cuisine has a similar speciality known as düs-vara.

== Ingredients and preparation ==
=== Fillings ===
Pierogi may be stuffed (singly or in combinations) with mashed potatoes, fried onions, quark or farmer cheese, cabbage, sauerkraut, ground meat, mushrooms, spinach, or other ingredients depending on the cook's preferences. Dessert versions of the dumpling can be stuffed with sweetened quark or with a fresh fruit filling such as cherry, strawberry, raspberry, bilberry, blueberry, apple, or plum; stoned prunes are sometimes used, as well as jam. For more flavor, sour cream can be added to the dough mixture, and this tends to lighten the dough.

=== Preparation ===
The dough, which is made by mixing flour and warm water, sometimes with an egg, is rolled flat and then cut into squares with a knife or circles using a cup or drinking glass. The dough can be made with some mashed potato, creating a smoother texture. Another variation, popular in Slovakia, uses dough made of flour and curd with eggs, salt, and water.

The filling is placed in the middle and the dough folded over to form a half circle or rectangle or triangle (if the dough is cut squarely). The seams are pressed together to seal the pierogi so that the filling will remain inside when it is cooked. The pierogi are simmered until they float, drained, and then sometimes fried or baked in butter before serving or fried as leftovers. They can be served with melted butter or sour cream, or garnished with small pieces of fried bacon, onions, and mushrooms. Dessert varieties may be topped with apple sauce, jam, or varenye.

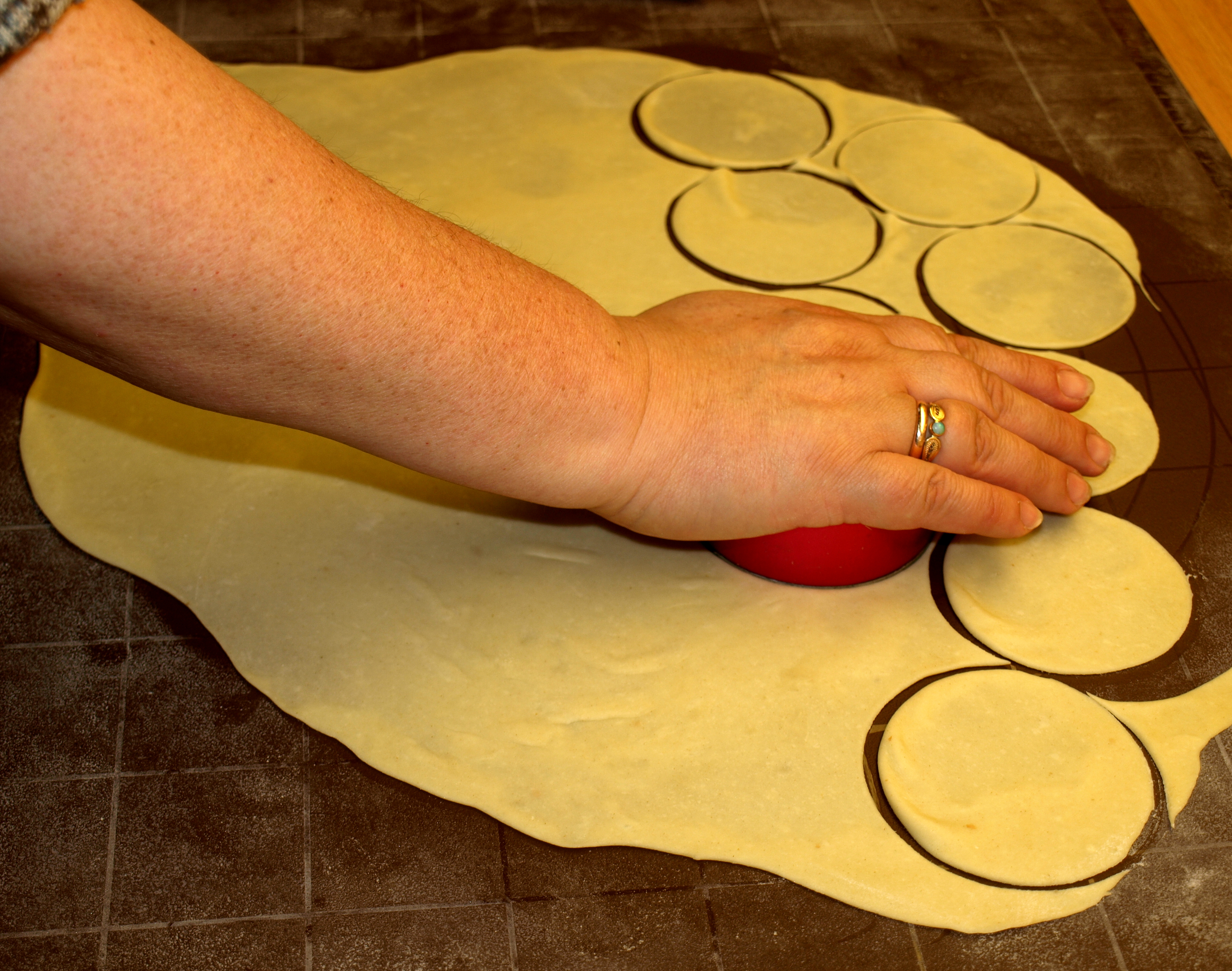
Cutting the dough into circles

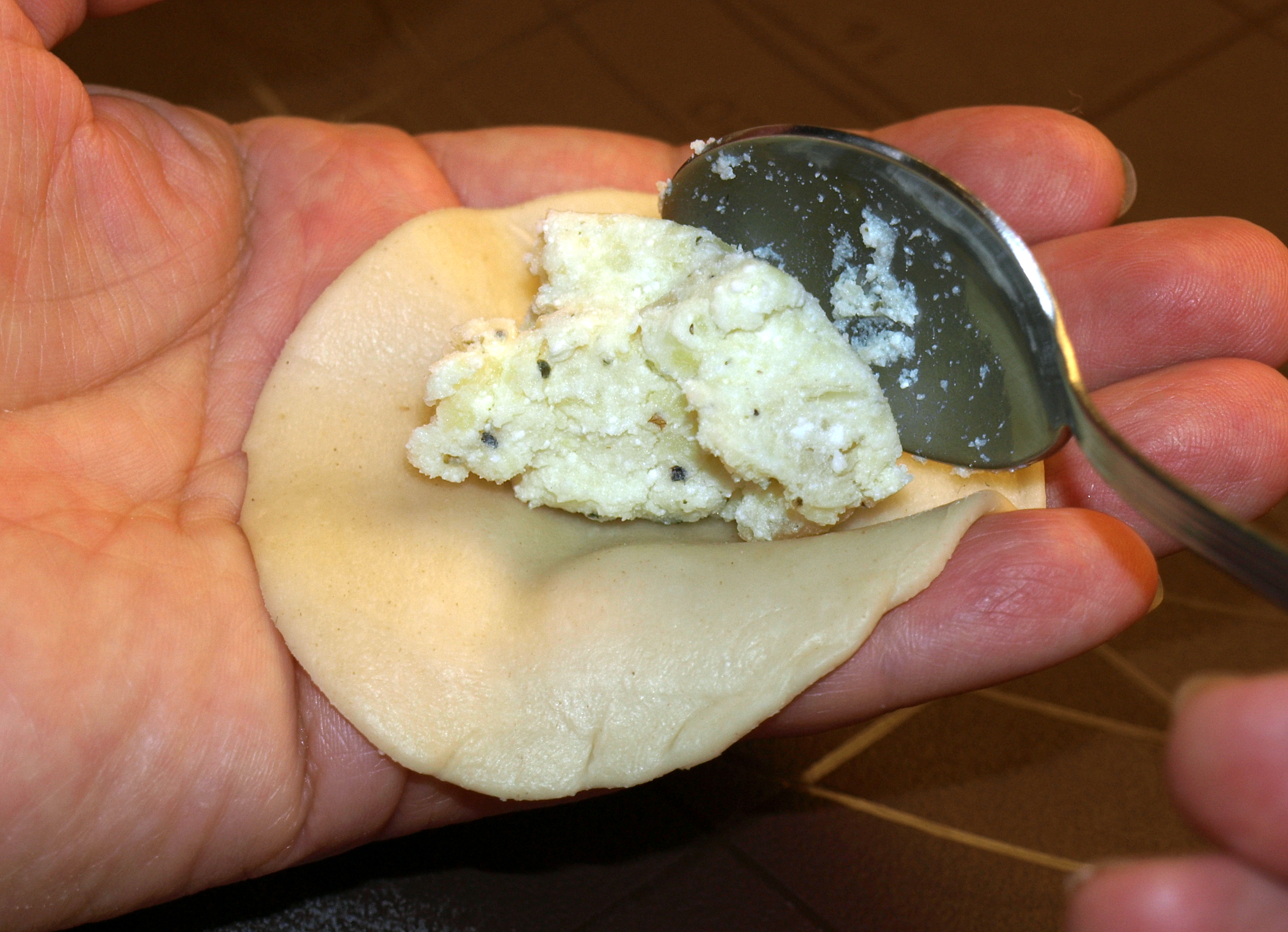
Placing the filling into a dough pocket

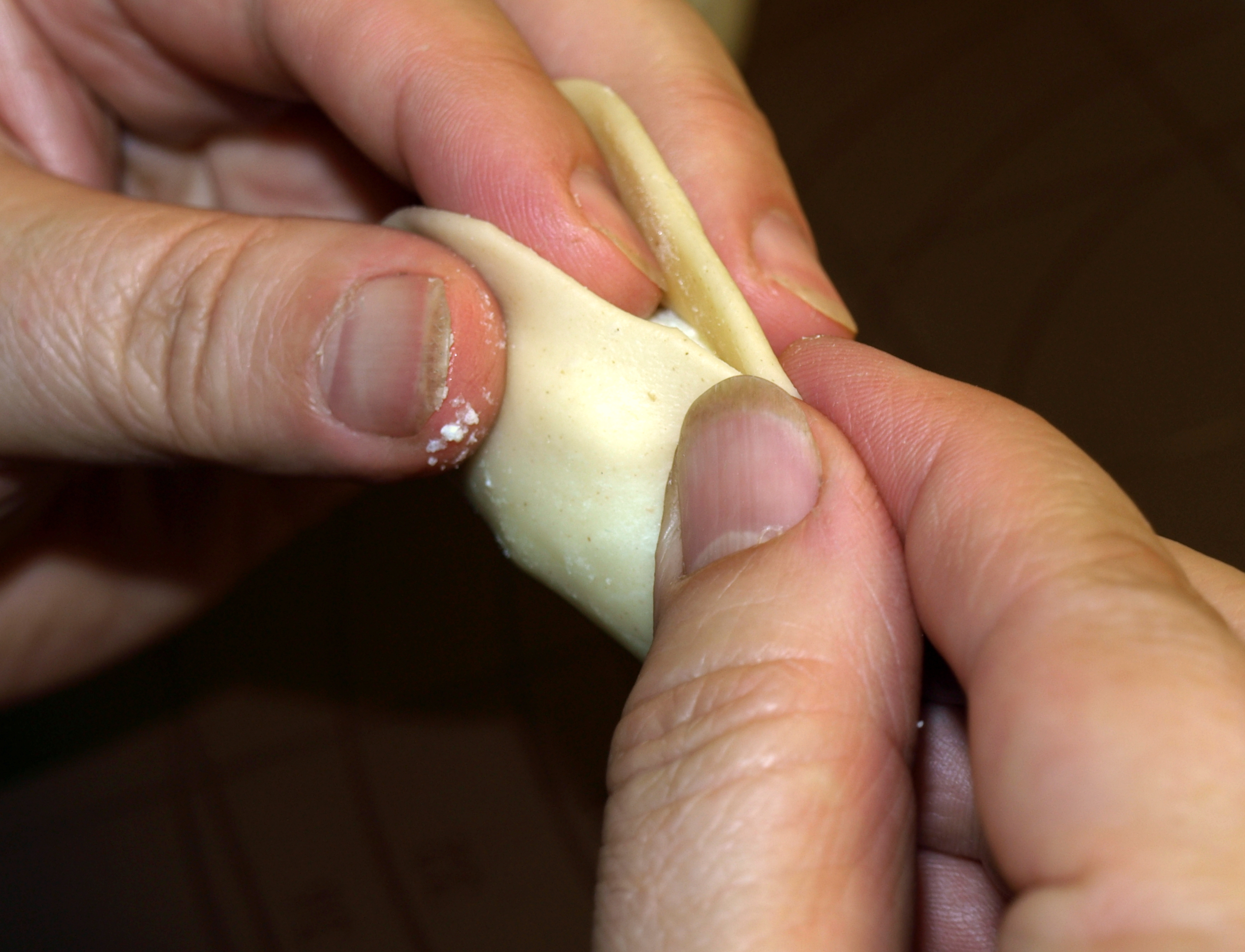
Closing the dough pocket

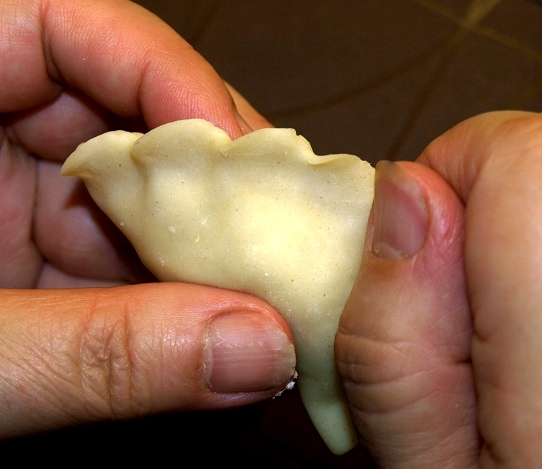
Sealing the pierogi

== Countries ==
=== Poland ===
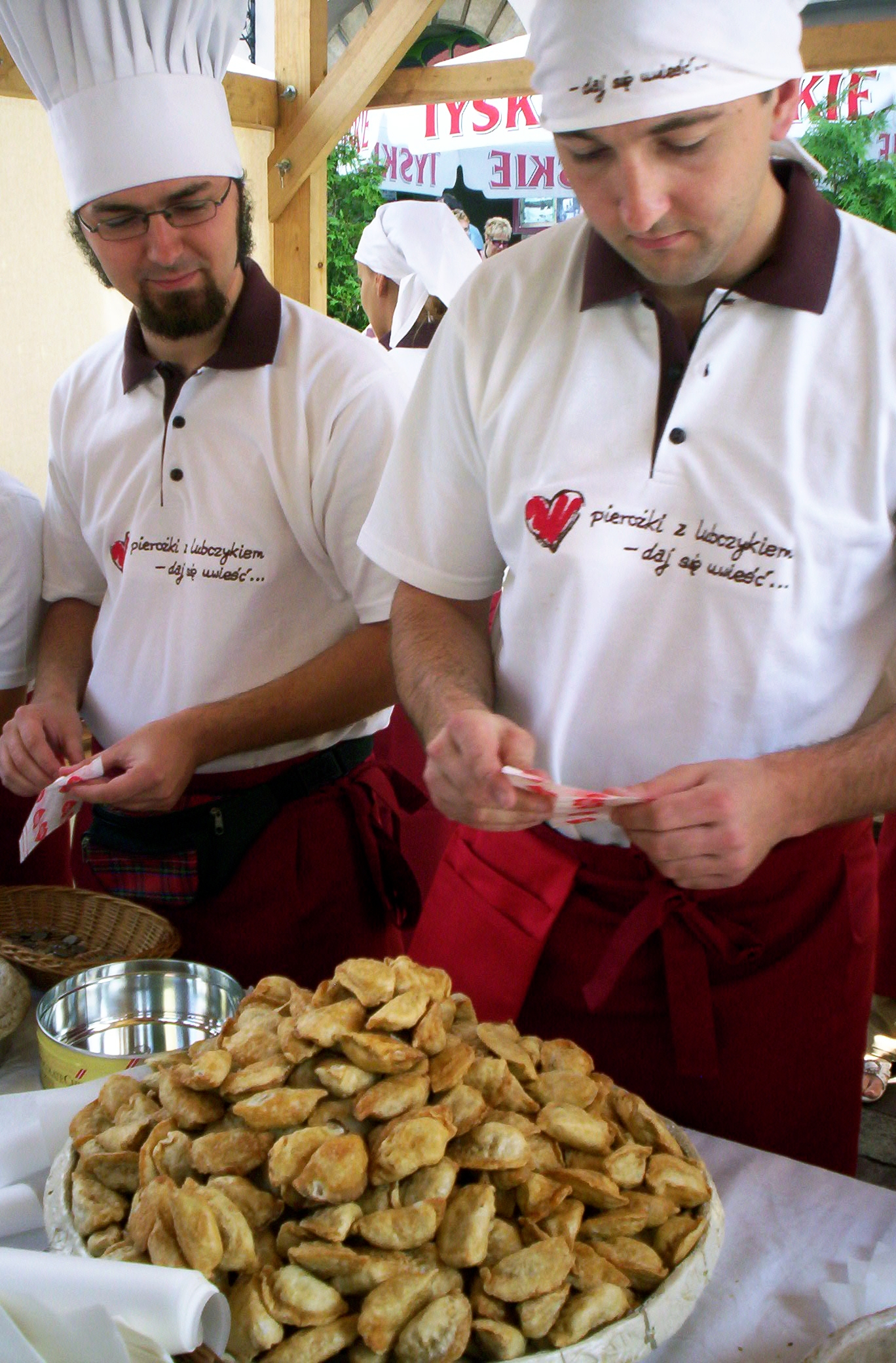
Pierogi festival in Kraków, Poland, that occurs on the Day of St. Hyacinth

Traditionally considered peasant food, pierogi eventually gained popularity and spread throughout all social classes, including the nobility. Cookbooks from the 17th century describe how during that era, pierogi were considered a staple of the Polish diet, and each holiday had its own special kind of pierogi created. They have different shapes, fillings and cooking methods. Important events like weddings had their own special type of pierogi kurniki – baked pie filled with chicken. Also, pierogi were made especially for mournings or wakes, and some for caroling season in January. In the east baked pierogi are a common and well-liked Christmas dish. They were stuffed with potatoes, cheese, cabbage, mushrooms, buckwheat, or millet. The most famous is the Biłgoraj pierogi stuffed with buckwheat, potatoes, and cheese and then baked in the oven.

Pierogi are an important part of Polish festive seasons, particularly Christmas Eve (Wigilia) and Christmastide. They are also served during public events, markets or festivals in a variety of forms and tastes, ranging from sweet to salty and spicy. At the 2007 Pierogi Festival in Kraków, 30,000 pierogi were consumed daily.

Polish pierogi are often filled with fresh quark, boiled and mashed potatoes, and fried onions. This type is known in Polish as pierogi ruskie ("Ruthenian pierogi", often mistakenly called Russian by foreigners). Other popular pierogi in Poland are filled with ground meat, mushrooms and cabbage, or for dessert an assortment of fruits (berries, with strawberries or blueberries the most common).

Sweet pierogi are usually served with sour cream mixed with sugar, and savory pierogi with bacon fat and bacon bits. Poles traditionally serve two types of pierogi for Christmas Eve supper. One kind is filled with sauerkraut and dried mushrooms, another – small uszka filled only with dried wild mushrooms – is served in clear barszcz. Leniwe pierogi ("lazy pierogi") are a different type of food, similar to lazy vareniki (see below), kopytka, or halušky.

=== Ukraine ===
Varenyky in Ukraine are a popular national dish, served both as a common everyday meal and as a part of some traditional celebrations, such as Christmas Eve Supper (Ukrainian: Свята Вечеря, romanized: Sviata Vecheria, lit. 'Holy Supper'). In some regions in or bordering modern-day Western Ukraine, particularly in Carpathian Ruthenia and Galicia, the terms varenyky and pyrohy are used to denote the same dish. However, Ukrainian varenyky are often not pan-fried.

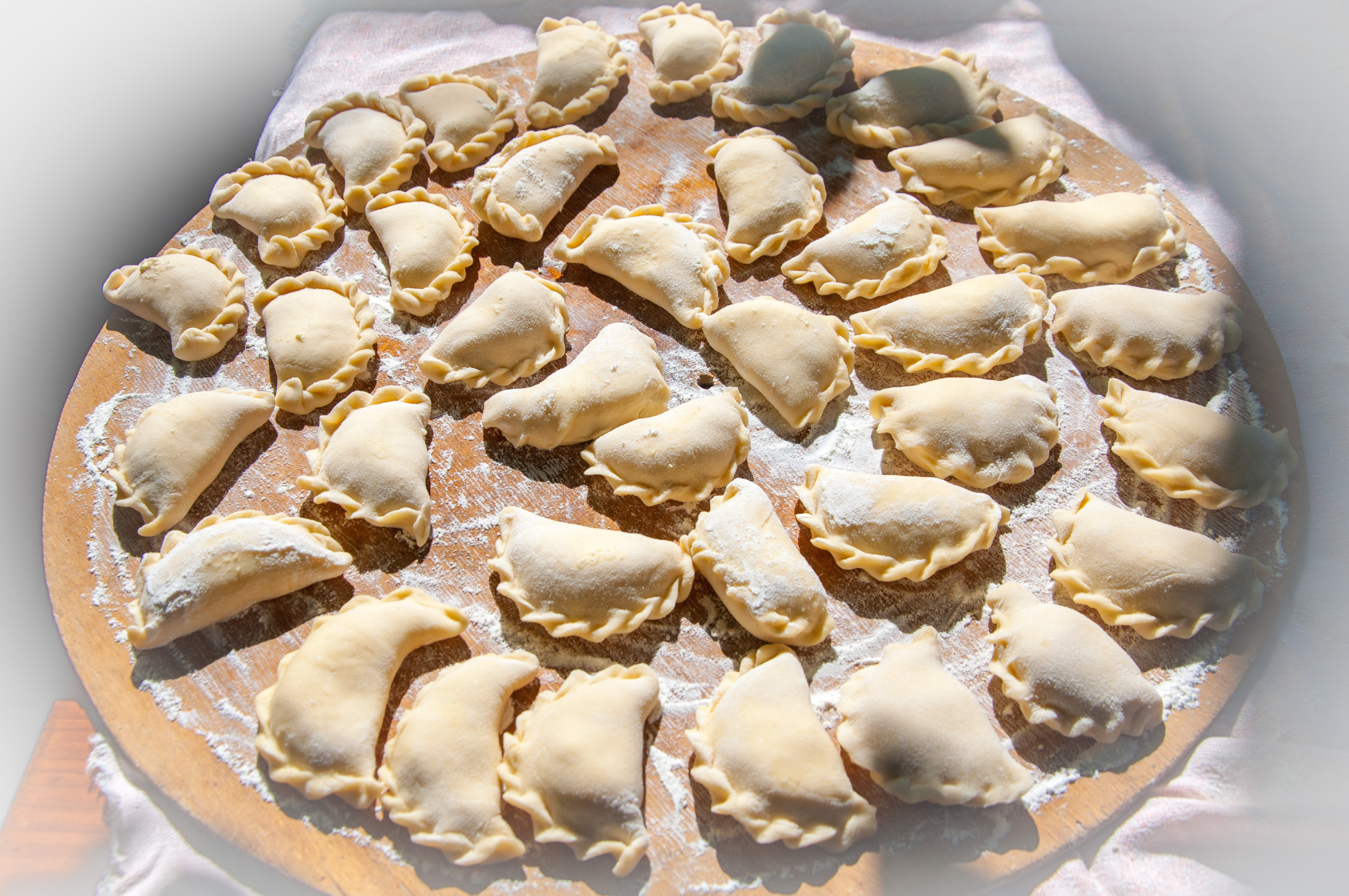
Traditional Ukrainian varenyky, before cooking and with crimped edges

Contrary to many other countries that share these dumplings, Ukrainians tended to use fermented milk products (soured milk or ryazhanka) to bind the dough together; however, today eggs tend to be used instead. Typical Ukrainian fillings for varenyky include curd cheese, potato, boiled beans, cabbage, mushy peas, plum, currants, sour cherries (and other fruits), meat, fish, and buckwheat. On Christmas Eve, they are traditionally prepared with meatless fillings (cabbage, mushrooms, potatoes, or poppy seeds) in keeping with the fast.

Traditionally, they are topped with sour cream (Ukrainian: сметана, romanized: smetana) and butter, as well as with fried onions, and fried pieces of salo (Ukrainian: шкварки, romanized: shkvarky). Whilst traditionally savory, varenyky can also be served as a dessert by simply substituting the filling of the dumpling to a sweet one. Dessert varenyky fillings include sour cherry, bilberries, sweet quark, and various fruits. The central regions of Ukraine are known for their more unusual varenyky, Poltava being known for its flour varenyky filling, in which the dumplings are filled with a mixture of flour, lard and fried pieces of bacon. However, unusual fillings can also be found in other regions, such as the hempseed varenyky from Polissia and Galicia.

These dumplings are notable in Ukrainian traditions and folklore. They appear frequently in folk songs, literature, and humor, where they are associated with abundance, comfort, and everyday joy. During festive occasions such as Christmas Eve, they are regarded as a symbol of prosperity and well-being. A long-standing custom involves placing a coin inside one of the dumplings, with the belief that whoever finds it will have good fortune and wealth in the coming year.

A yearly festival commemorating varenyky is held at the Ukrainian ski resort town of Bukovel in the Carpathian Mountains. In 2013, a snow monument to varenyky was made in Bukovel, and was submitted to the Guinness Book of Records as the biggest snow varenyk in the world.

In Ukrainian tradition, varenyky were equated with a young moon due to the similar shape, and were used as part of pagan and sacrificial rituals. For example, cheese varenyky would be sacrificed near water springs, and farmers would also believe that varenyky helped bring a rich harvest, so they took homemade dumplings with them to the fields.

=== German-speaking regions ===
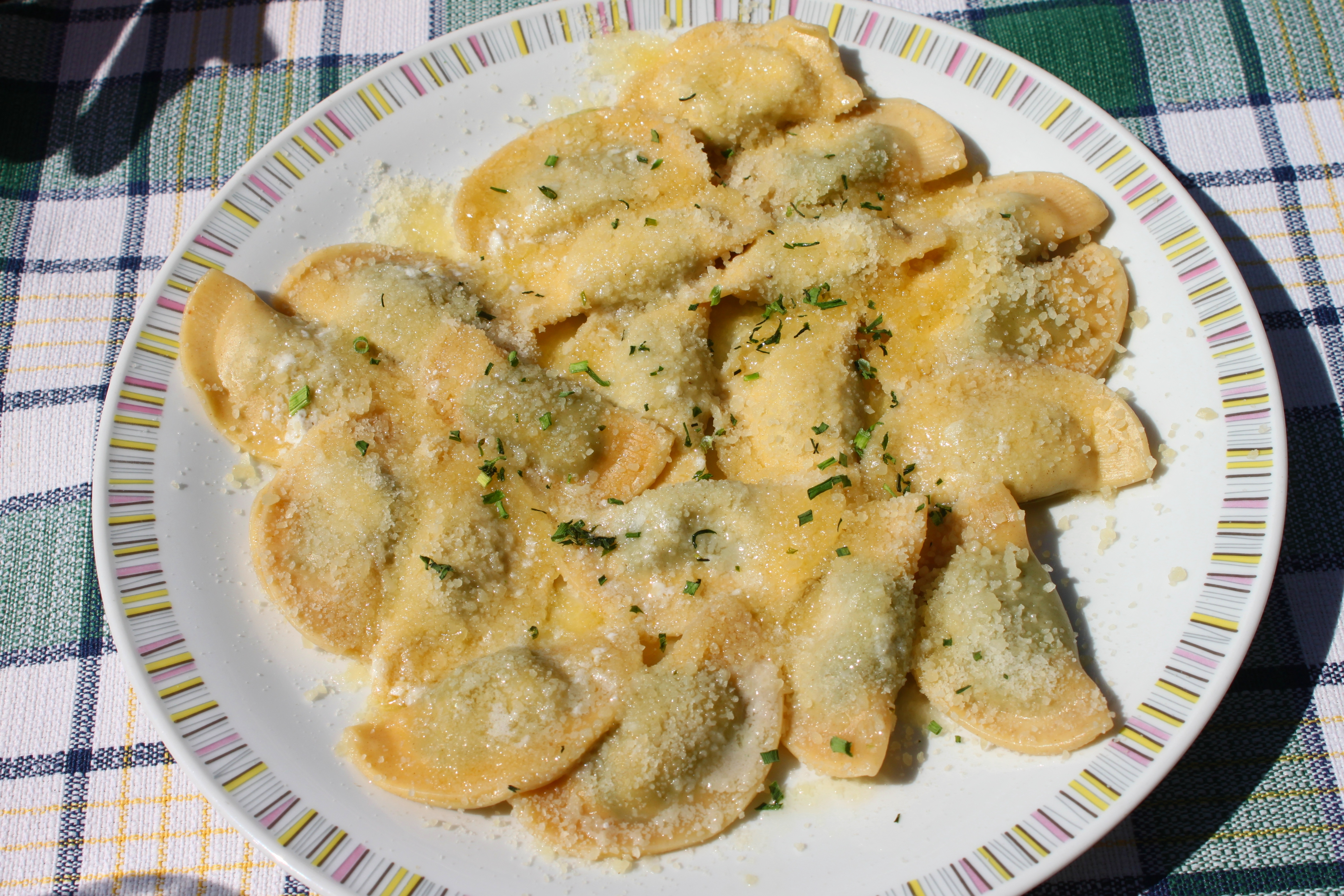
Schlutzkrapfen with spinach and ricotta, South Tyrol

The common term Pirogge (pl. Piroggen) describes all kinds of Eastern European filled dumplings and buns, including pierogi, pirozhkis and pirogs. Certain types of piroggen, both boiled and baked, were common fare for Germans living in Eastern Europe and the Baltic are still prepared by their descendants living there and in Germany. In particular, baked pīrādziņi are known as Kurländer Speckkuchen ("Courland bacon/speck pies") in the cuisine of Baltic Germans.

Schlutzkrapfen closely resemble pierogi; they are common in Tirol and northern Italy's German-speaking region of South Tyrol, and are occasionally found in Bavaria. Fillings may include meat or potatoes, but the most widespread filling is a combination of spinach and quark (Topfen) or ricotta. Another similar Austrian dish, known as Kärntner Nudel (Carinthian noodles), is made with a wide range of fillings, from meat, mushrooms, potato or quark to apples, pears or mint. These regional specialties differ significantly from the most common Swabian filled dumplings known as Maultaschen.

=== Hungary ===
In Hungarian cuisine, the derelye is similar to the pierogi, consisting of pasta pockets filled with jam, cottage cheese, or sometimes meat. Derelye is consumed primarily as a festive food for special occasions such as weddings; it is also eaten for regular meals, but this tradition has become rare.

=== Romania and Moldova ===
In Romania and Moldova, a similar recipe is called colțunași, with regional varieties such as piroști in Transylvania and Bukovina regions and chiroște in Moldavia region. Colțunași is either a dessert filled with jam (usually plum), fresh sour cherries, or cottage cheese, or savory, filled with dill-seasoned cheese (telemea or urdă), mashed potatoes, or chopped meat. The dough is made with wheat flour and the colțunași are boiled in salted water, pan-fried in oil, or baked in the oven.

The word is a cognate with Slavic kalduny, a type of dumplings. In both Bukovina and Transylvania, the name piroști is used in Romanian families of German or Slavic origin and the filling can also be a whole, fresh, seedless plum. The term colțunaș is used by native Romanian families and are usually filled with cottage cheese or quark and served topped with sour cream smântână, traditionally called colțunași cu smântână.

=== Russia and Belarus ===
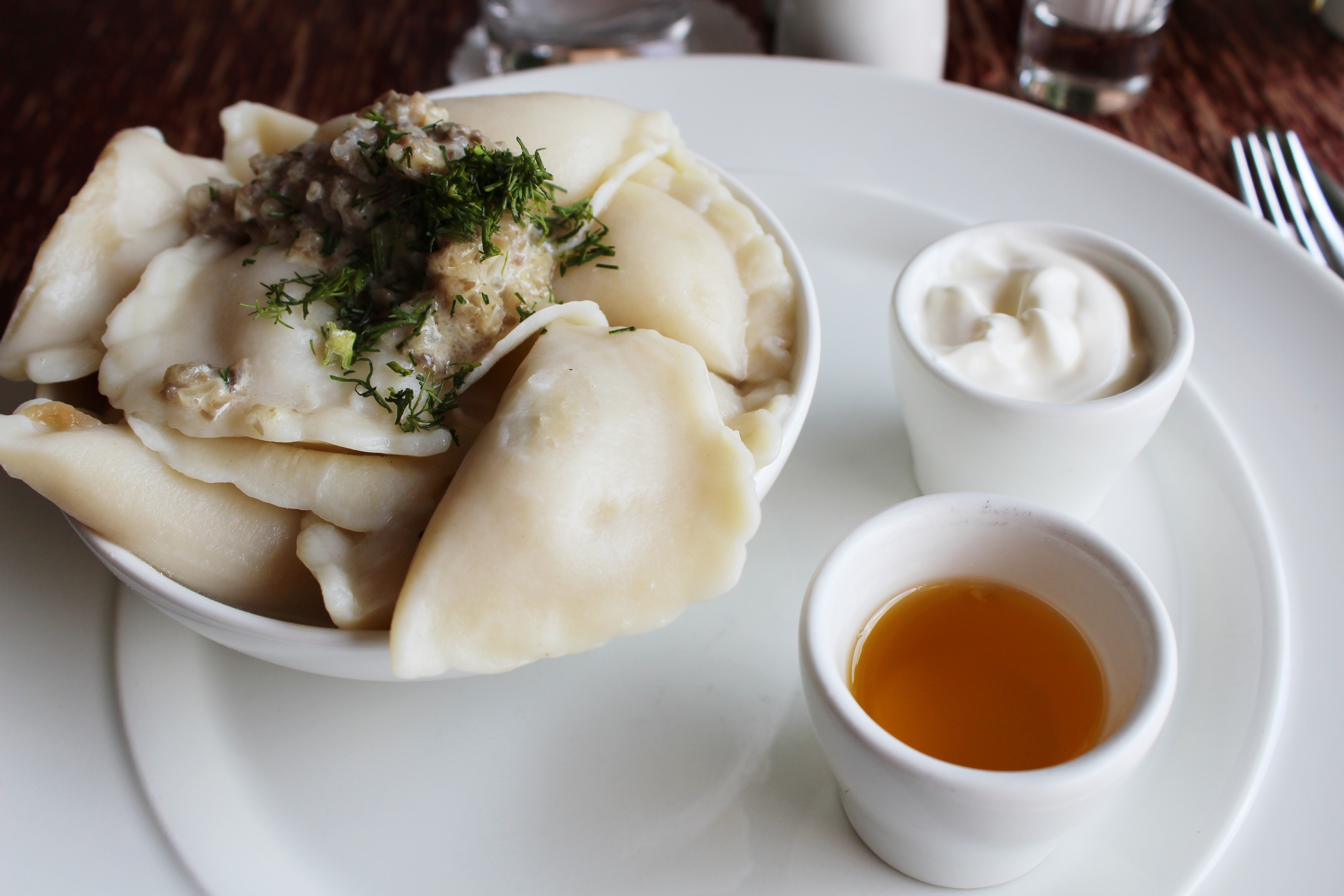
Vareniki served in Saint Petersburg

Vareniki are most often filled with potatoes (sometimes mixed with mushrooms), quark cheese, cabbage, beef, and berries. They can be topped with fried onions and bacon, or butter, and served with sour cream. This Ukrainian dish became especially popular in Russia during the Soviet period, when it became part of the menu of public catering and international Soviet cuisine. Pelmeni are significantly different; they are smaller, shaped differently and usually filled with ground meat (pork, lamb, beef, fish) or mushrooms as well as salt, pepper, and sometimes herbs and onions.

In modern Russian, pirozhki always mean a baked, in oven, or sometimes in a frying pan, usually under the lid, dough with filling. For dough with fillings, cooked in boiling water, exact naming is used – vareniki, pelmeni, pozy (steamed), etc.

Belarusian cuisine has been influenced by the country's proximity to Poland, Ukraine, and Russia helps create a unique blend which takes up all three. Kalduny are the result, and are one of the most recognizable foods from Belarus.

==== Russian Mennonite cuisine ====
Due to centuries of close-knit community and mass migration from the Netherlands, northern Prussia, the Russian Empire, and the Americas, the Russian Mennonites developed a unique ethnicity and cuisine. In Russian Mennonite cuisine the pierogi is more commonly called vereniki and almost always is stuffed with cottage cheese and served with a thick white cream gravy called schmaunt fat. Russian Mennonites will also stuff the vereniki with fruit such as Saskatoon berries or blueberries. It is often accompanied with farmer sausage (formavorscht) or ham. Mennonite-style vereniki is no longer common in Poland, Russia, or Ukraine, but is very common in the Canadian prairies, Chihuahua, Mexico, Paraguay, Bolivia, and other places where Russian Mennonites settled.

=== Slovakia ===
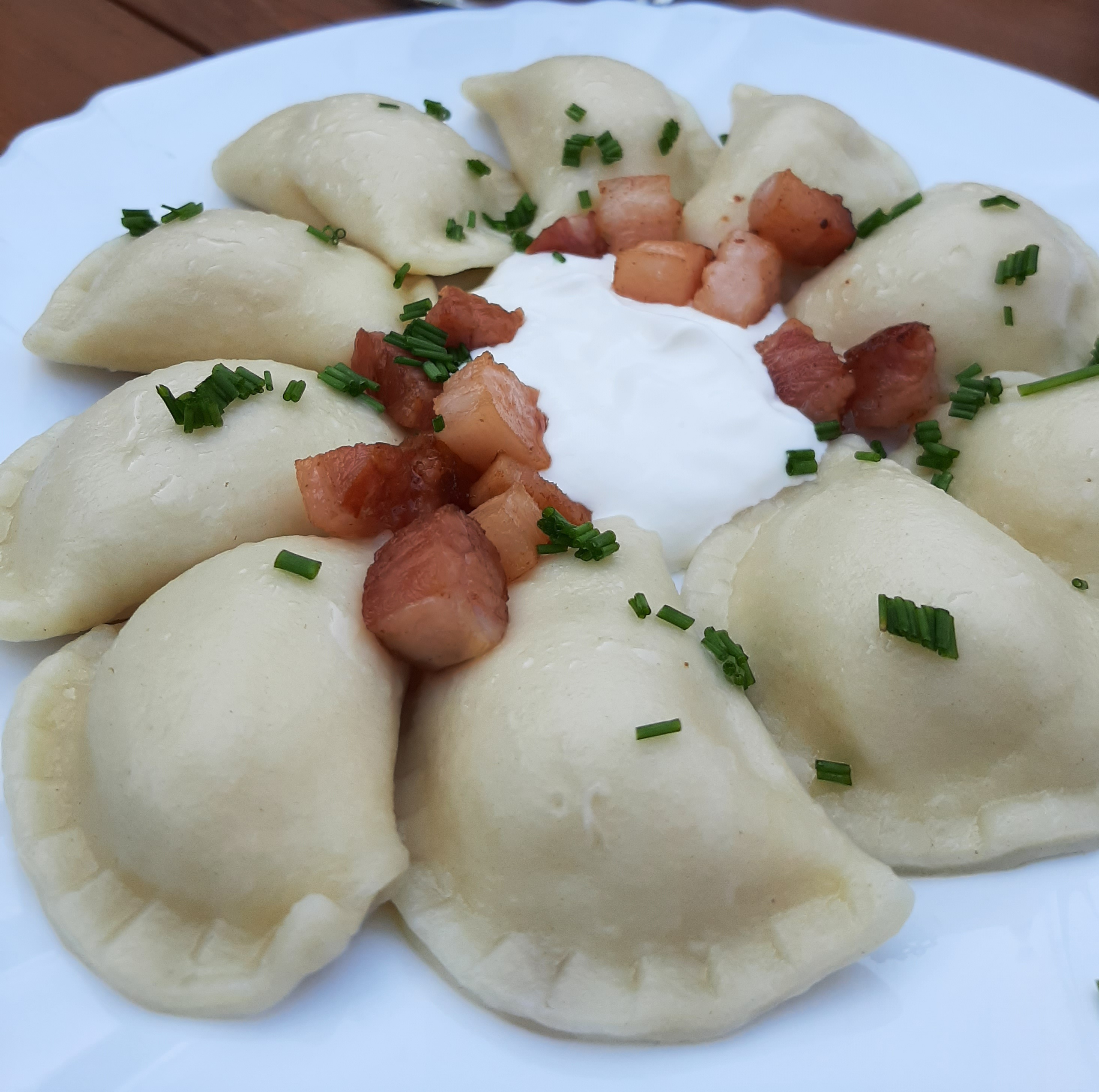
Bryndzové pirohy

A traditional dish in Slovak cuisine is bryndzové pirohy, dumplings filled with salty bryndza cheese mixed with mashed potatoes. Bryndzové pirohy are served with some more bryndza (mixed with milk or sour cream, so it has a liquid consistency and serves as a dip) and topped with bacon or fried onion. In Slovakia, pirohy are semicircular in shape.

Along with bryndzové halušky, bryndzové pirohy is one of Slovakia's national dishes. Some other varieties include pirohy filled with mashed potatoes, apples, jam, or quark.

=== Bosnia and Herzegovina ===
Klepe are popular in Sarajevo, filled with minced meat, and topped with sour cream, garlic, and paprika.

=== Slovenia ===
Ajdovi krapi (literally buckwheat carps) are a dish popular in the northeastern and Alpine regions of Slovenia. Made with buckwheat rather than wheat flour and filled with a mixture of cottage cheese (skuta), millet, and fried onions, they are traditionally topped with pork fat crisps, fried bacon, or fried onion, but today often with butter breadcrumbs. Along with žganci and štruklji, they form a trio of buckwheat-based dishes typical of Slovenian cuisine.

=== Turkey ===
Piruhi is a traditional dish made in some parts of Anatolia which was also existed in Ottoman court cuisine. It is usually made with wheat flour and egg and filled with a mixture of Tulum cheese, parsley, and onion. Served with toasted walnuts in butter.

=== United States and Canada ===
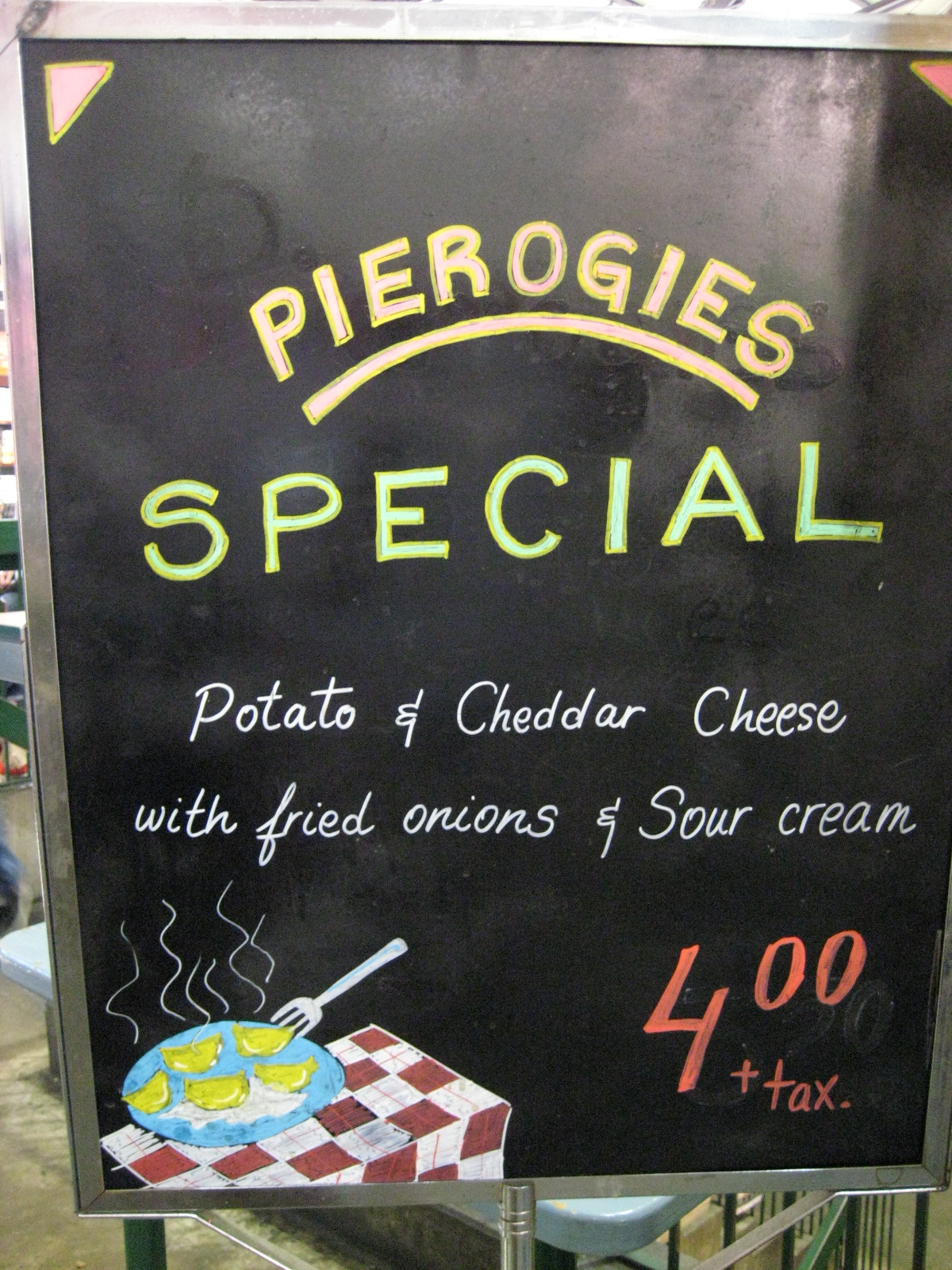
Pierogi special at a fast-food stall in St. Lawrence Market, Toronto

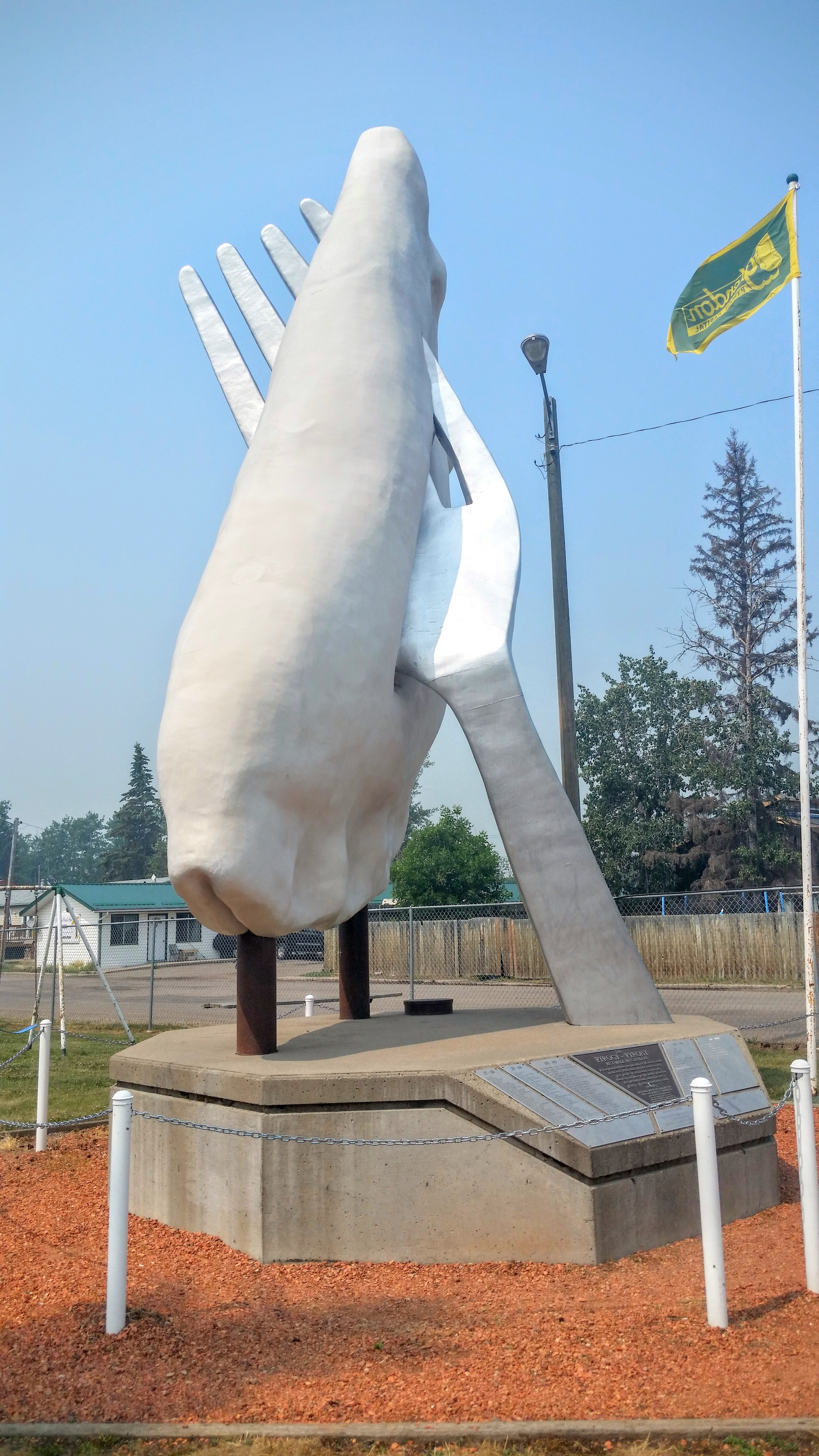
Pierogi sculpture in Glendon, Alberta

Pierogi were brought to the United States and Canada by Central and Eastern European immigrants. They are particularly common in areas with large Polish or Ukrainian populations, such as the Province of Alberta, Pittsburgh, Chicago, and New York City (particularly in the East Village of Manhattan and Greenpoint in Brooklyn) along with its New Jersey suburbs. Pierogi were at first a family food among immigrants as well as being served in ethnic restaurants. The pierogi in America initially came from Cleveland, Ohio, when the first documented sale of pierogi was made at the Marton House Tavern in Cleveland in 1928. In the post–World War II era, freshly cooked pierogi became a staple of fundraisers by ethnic churches. By the 1960s, pierogi were a common supermarket item in the frozen food aisles in many parts of the United States and Canada, and are still found in grocery stores today.

Numerous towns with Central and Eastern European heritage celebrate the pierogi. They have become a symbol of Polish-American cultural identity. Many families make them together for Christmas. The city of Whiting, Indiana, celebrates the food at its Pierogi Fest every July. Pierogi are also commonly associated with Cleveland, where there are yearly events such as the Slavic Village Pierogi Dash and the Parma Run-Walk for Pierogies. Pittsburgh, Pennsylvania, also celebrates pierogi. There is a "pierogi race" at every home Pittsburgh Pirates baseball game. In the race, six runners wearing pierogi costumes race toward a finish line. In 1993, the village of Glendon, Alberta erected a roadside tribute to this culinary creation: a 27-foot (8.2 m) fiberglass perogy (preferred local spelling), complete with fork.

The United States has a substantial pierogi market because of its large Central and Eastern European immigrant populations. Unlike other countries with newer populations of European settlers, the modern pierogi is found in a wide selection of flavors throughout grocery stores in the United States. Many of these grocery-brand pierogi contain non-traditional ingredients to appeal to American tastes, including spinach, jalapeño, and chicken.

Pierogi enjoyed a brief popularity as a sports food when Paula Newby-Fraser adopted them as her food of choice for the biking portion of the 1989 Hawaii Ironman Triathlon. For more than a decade thereafter, Mrs. T's (the largest American pierogi manufacturer) sponsored triathlons, some professional triathletes and "fun runs" around the country. For many triathletes, pierogi represented an alternative to pasta as a way to boost their carbohydrate intakes.

According to pierogi manufacturer Mrs. T's, based in Shenandoah, Pennsylvania, pierogi consumption in the United States is largely concentrated in a geographical region dubbed the "Pierogi Pocket", an area including New York, New Jersey, Pennsylvania, Ohio, Indiana, Chicago, Detroit, parts of the northern Midwest and southern New England which accounts for 68 percent of annual US pierogi consumption.

Canada has a large Polish population as well as Ukrainian populations, the latter being particularly concentrated in the Prairie provinces. Pierogi (known locally as perogies) are common throughout the country. The Canadian market for pierogi is second only to that of the U.S. market, the latter having been the destination of choice for the majority of Central and Eastern European immigrants before and during World War II. Packed frozen pierogi can be found wherever Central and Eastern European immigrant communities exist and are generally ubiquitous across Canada, even in big chain stores. Typically frozen flavors include analogs of ruskie pierogi filled with potato and either cheddar cheese, onion, bacon, cottage cheese, or mixed cheeses. Homemade versions are typically filled with either mashed potatoes (seasoned with salt and pepper and often mixed with dry curd cottage cheese or cheddar cheese), sauerkraut, or fruit. These are then boiled, and either served immediately, put in ovens and kept warm, or fried in oil or butter. Popular fruit varieties include strawberry, blackberry, blueberry, and saskatoon berry.

Potato and cheese or sauerkraut versions are usually served with some or all the following: butter or oil, sour cream (typical), fried onions, fried bacon or kielbasa (sausage), and a creamy mushroom sauce (less common). Some ethnic kitchens will deep-fry perogies; dessert and main course dishes can be served this way.

The frozen varieties are sometimes served casserole-style with a mixture of chopped ham, onions, peppers, and cheddar cheese or with an Italian-style mixture of ground beef, onions, and tomato sauce.

National chain restaurants in Canada feature the dish or variations. Boston Pizza has a sandwich and a pizza flavored to taste like pierogies, while Smitty's serves theirs as an appetizer deep-fried with a side of salsa.

=== United Kingdom ===
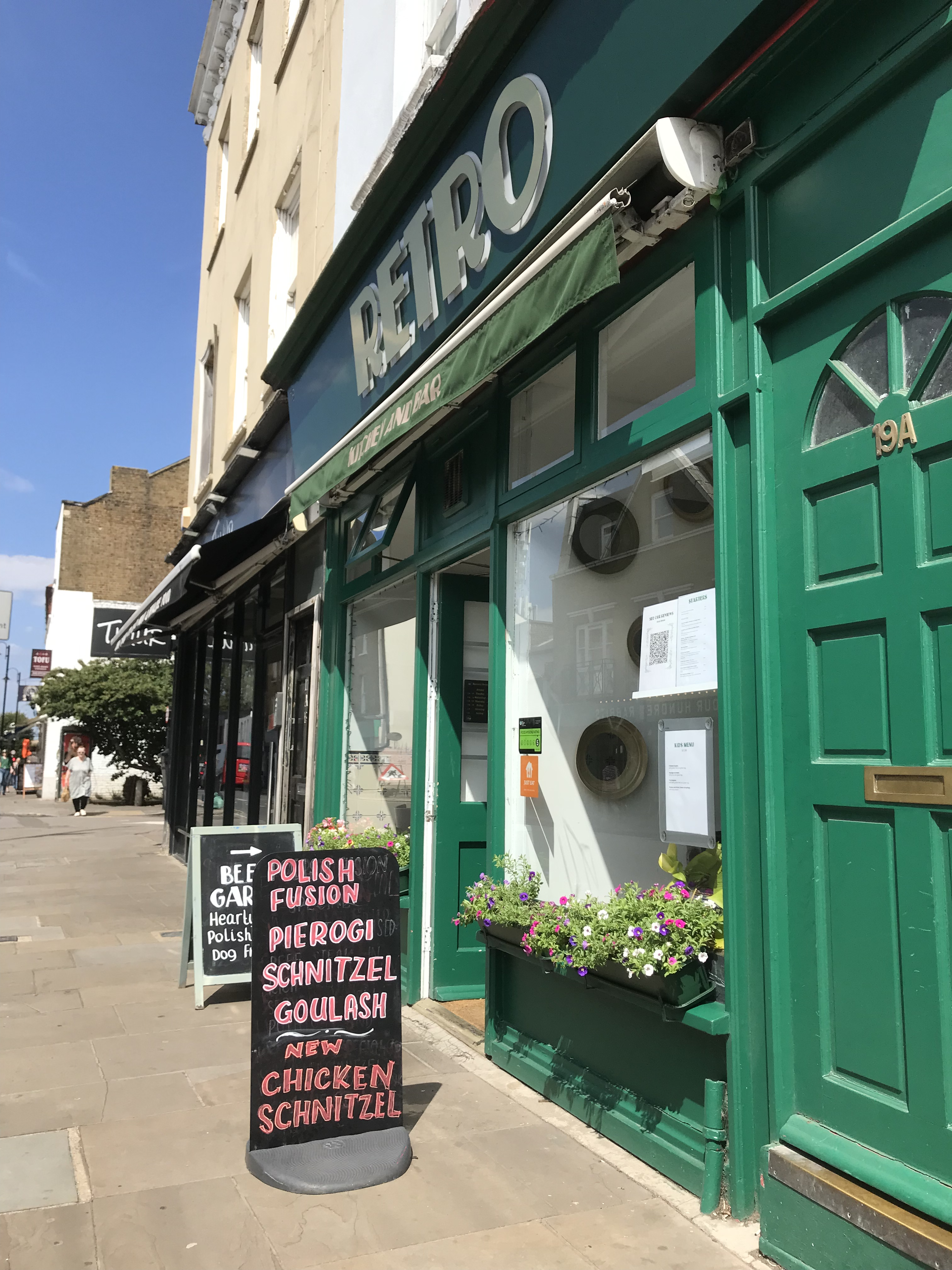
A board advertising pierogi outside a cafe in the Crystal Palace Triangle, London

Pierogi are regarded as a symbol of the Polish community in Britain and have become a relatively well-known dish.

== Lazy noodles and lazy varenyky ==
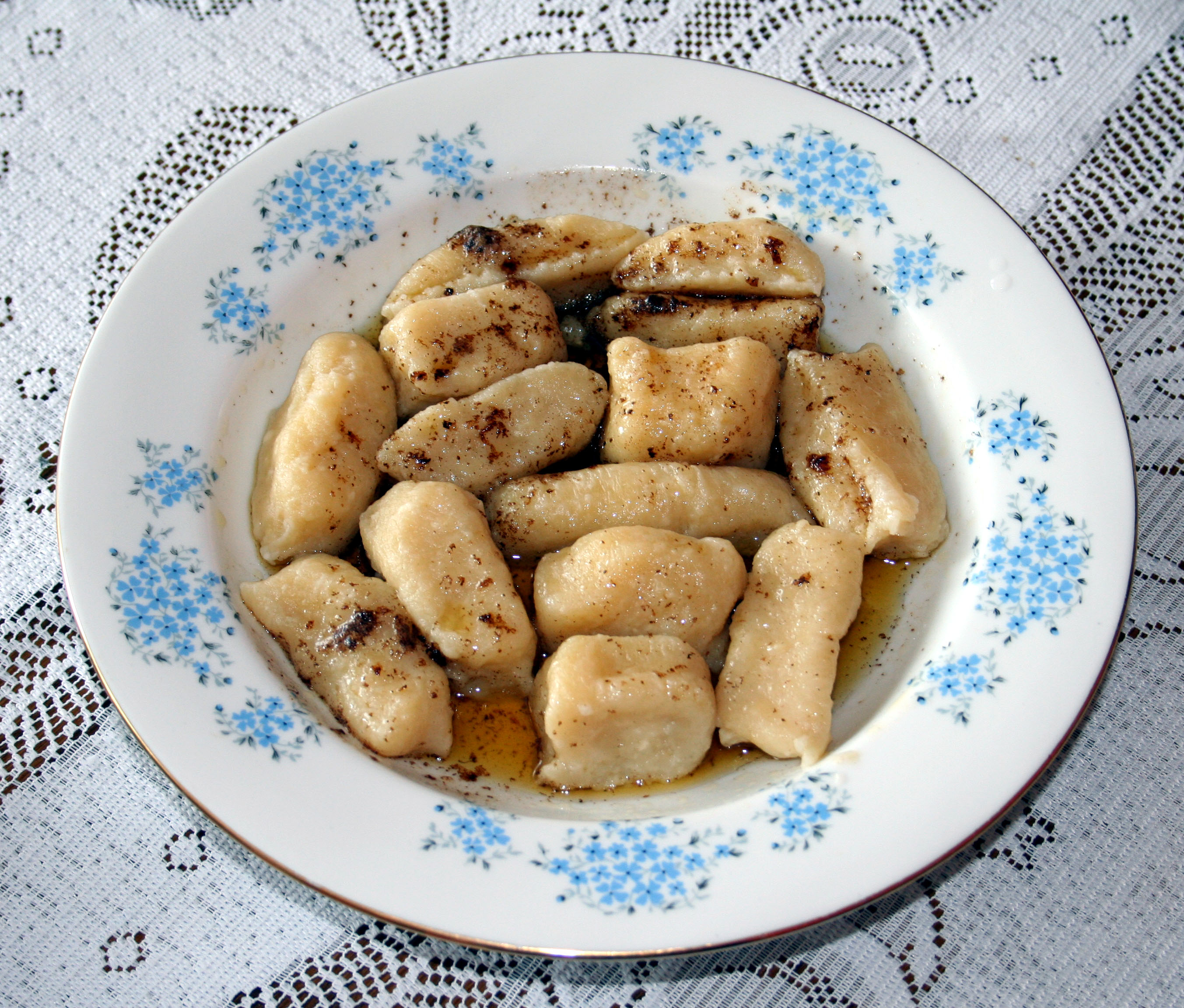
Kluski leniwe Polish style, garnished with cinnamon

Lazy varenyky (Ukrainian: книдлі, ліниві вареники, Russian: ленивые вареники) in Ukrainian and Russian cuisine and lazy pierogi (Polish: leniwe pierogi, Rusyn: leniwe pyrohy) in Polish and Rusyn cuisines, are gnocchi-shaped dumplings made by mixing domashniy sir (curd cheese) with egg and flour into quick dough. The cheese-based dough is formed into a long sausage about 2 centimeters (3/4 in) thick, then cut diagonally into gnocchi, called halushky in Ukrainian and Rusyn and galushki in Russian. The dumplings are then quickly boiled in salted water and served with sour cream or melted butter.

The name "lazy varenyky" reflects the quick preparation time of the dish, usually taking 10 to 15 minutes from assembling the simple ingredients to serving the cooked dumplings. Lazy varenyky differ from standard varenyky in the same way that Italian gnocchi differ from ravioli or tortellini: these are fluffy solid dumplings, rather than stuffed pockets of dough.

== In culture ==
Pierogi have their own patron saint: Saint Hyacinth of Poland, a monk tied to the history of pierogi. He is sometimes called "Święty Jacek z pierogami" (St. Hyacinth with his pierogi) and invoked under this moniker, this custom is especially tied to the traditional "baked pierogi of St. Hyacinth" of Nockowa in Subcarpathia. In addition, "Święty Jacek z pierogami!" is an old Polish expression of surprise, roughly equivalent to the English language "good grief" or American "holy smokes!" The origin of this usage is unknown.

In Ukrainian literature, varenyky appeared as a symbol of national identity, sometimes stressing its distinction from Russian. In the poem by Stepan Rudansky Varenyky-Varenyky (1858), a Russian soldier asks a Ukrainian countrywoman to cook varenyky for him. However, he cannot think of the word "varenyky", while the woman pretends not to understand him.

The Great Pittsburgh Pierogi Race N'at, commonly called the Great Pierogi Race, is an American mascot race between innings during a Pittsburgh Pirates baseball game that features six contestants racing in giant pierogi costumes: Potato Pete (blue hat), Jalapeño Hannah (green hat), Cheese Chester (yellow hat), Sauerkraut Saul (red hat), Oliver Onion (purple hat), and Bacon Burt (orange hat).

Though 'pierogi' simply refers to filled dumplings in Poland and other Slavic countries, they actually hold deeper significance. Traditionally in the medieval ages, the rich enjoyed pierogi as a high-class meal, considering it a delicacy. Pierogi gradually gained popularity due to their affordability and versatility, and people began serving them at festivals, religious holidays, and as a common food for everyone. On festival days and religious occasions such as wigilia, families served pierogi as a symbol of unity. Pierogi also represented ethnic pride in Polish communities and helped unite Poles during difficult times. Entire communities often gathered to spend a day making pierogi together. Pierogi require labor-intensive preparation, symbolizing the tenacity of the Polish people and their ability to overcome hardships.

=== Monuments ===
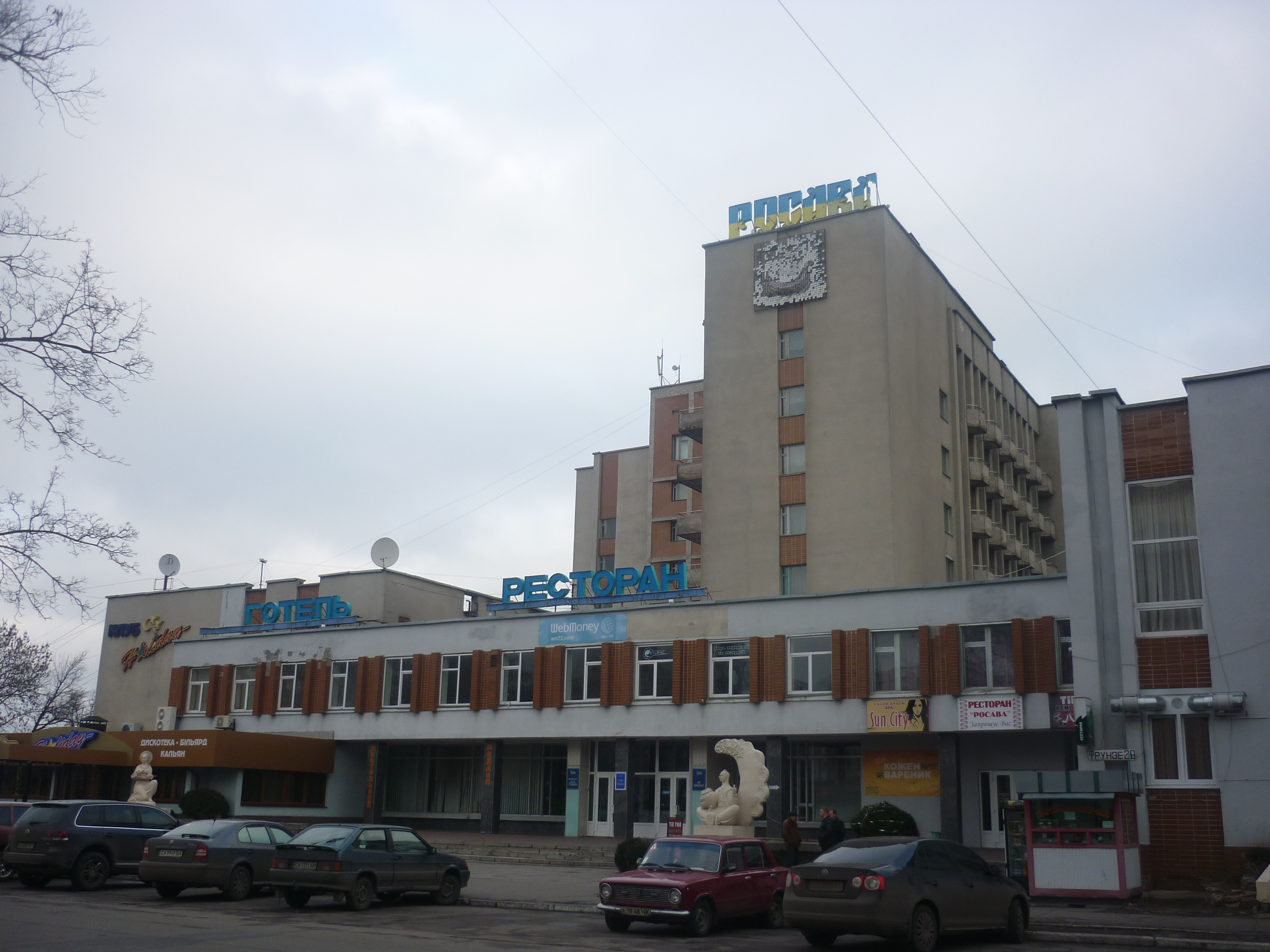
The varenyky themed statue outside a hotel in Cherkasy

A monument to varenyky was inaugurated in Cherkasy, Ukraine in September 2006. The monument erected at the entrance to a hotel depicts Cossack Mamay (a Ukrainian folklore hero whose fondness for varenyky was narrated by Taras Shevchenko and Nikolay Gogol) eating varenyky from an earthenware pot, with a huge crescent-shaped varenyk behind him.

In 1991, a giant 7.6-meter (25 ft)-tall pierogi statue on a fork was erected in the village of Glendon in Alberta, Canada. In January 2010, a pierogi statue was proposed to be erected in Minneapolis, Minnesota.

== See also ==
- Momo
- Central European cuisine
- Eastern European cuisine
- Kalduny
- List of dumplings
- List of stuffed dishes
- Pampuchy
- Speķrauši
- Syrniki
- Uszka
- Jiaozi
- Naleśniki
- Gujiya
- Empanada
- Romani cuisine
- Mennonite cuisine
- Comfort food
- European cuisine
