= Uszka =

Small dumplings traditional in Poland and Ukraine

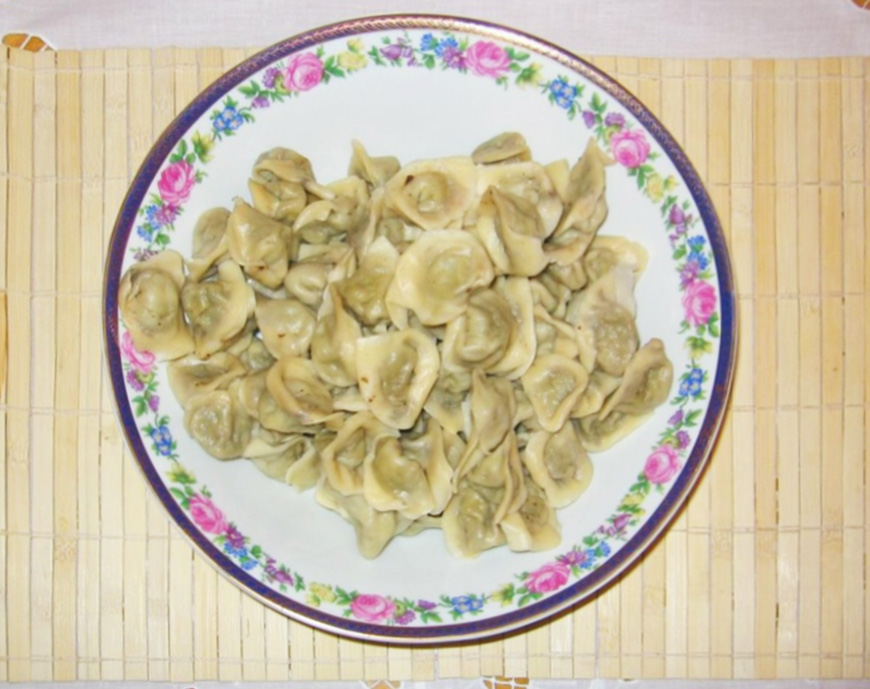
- Place of origin: Poland
- Main ingredients: Unleavened dough
- Variations: Mushroom, minced meat

Uszka, ushka (Polish: [ˈuʂka]) or vushka (Ukrainian: вушка [ˈwuʃkɐ]; Belarusian: вушкі [ˈvuʂkʲi]; lit. 'little ears') are small dumplings (a very small and twisted version of pierogi) usually filled with flavourful wild forest mushrooms and/or minced meat. They are usually served with borscht, though they can be eaten simply with melted butter and herbs (usually chives) sprinkled over. When vegetarian (filled only with mushrooms or onion) they are a part of traditional Christmas Eve dishes in Poland, Belarus, and western Ukraine, and are either added to the soup or eaten as a side dish.

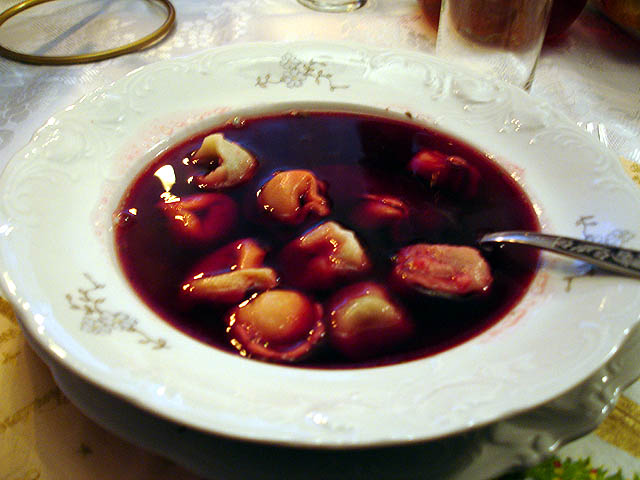
Uszka in traditional Polish barszcz

== See also ==
- Pierogi
- Pelmeni
- Varenyky
- Kreplekh
- Maultasche
