= Ostoni =

Italian food production company

Luigi Ostoni SRL
- Company type: Private
- Industry: Pasta production equipment manufacturer
- Founded: 1958
- Headquarters: Cormano, Province of Milan, Italy
- Key people: Marco Ostoni
- Website: www.ostoni.com

Ostoni is a manufacturer of plants, machines, dyes, accessories and spare parts used in pasta production operations. The company produces, refurbishes and sells new and second-hand equipment worldwide and is known especially for its machines for filled products (such as ravioli, cappelletti, tortelloni, tortellini and pelmeni). Ostoni began manufacturing pasta machines in 1958, in Milan, Italy, and has opened another workshop in Romania in 2006.
