= Komi cuisine =

Cuisine of the Komi Republic and Komi peoples

Komi cuisine consists of the cuisine of the Komi Republic and the Komi peoples, and is characterized by the rich use of local foods.

Significant differences separate Komis' dining preferences in the northern and southern regions of their homeland. In the northern reindeer herding and hunting areas, meat is eaten daily, but it is not in the more agricultural south. In the south, fish is commonly eaten; hogs and poultry are eaten less often.

Komi women bake fish pie (Komi: черинянь) on festive family occasions. The Fish Pie Festival (Komi: Черинянь гаж) is held annually on the last Sunday of June in the village of Byzovaya, Pechora Raion.

Traditional Komi beverages include kvas and sur, a type of ale.
