= Kreplach =

Traditional Jewish dumplings

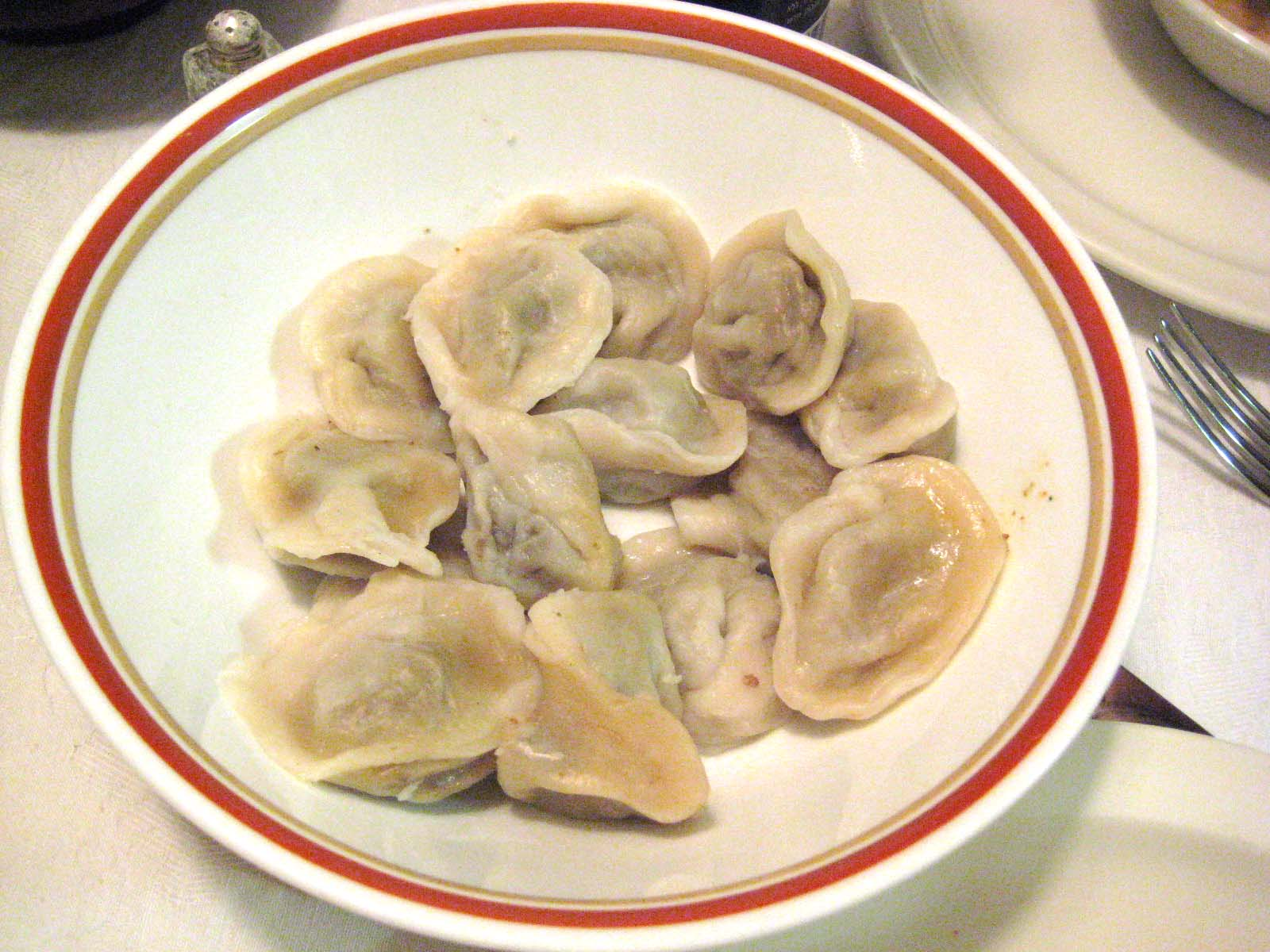
- Type: Dumpling
- Created by: Ashkenazi Jews
- Main ingredients: Dough: flour, water and eggs Filling: ground meat, mashed potatoes or other

Kreplach (from Yiddish: קרעפּלעך, romanized: Kreplekh) are small dumplings in Ashkenazi Jewish cuisine filled with ground meat, mashed potatoes or another filling, usually boiled and served in chicken soup, though they may also be served fried. They are similar to other types of dumpling, such as Polish pierogi, Polish and Ukrainian uszka, Russian pelmeni, Italian ravioli or tortellini, German Maultaschen, and Chinese jiaozi and wonton. The dough is traditionally made of flour, water and eggs, kneaded and rolled out into thin sheets. Some modern-day cooks use frozen dough sheets or wonton wrappers. Ready-made kreplach are also sold in the kosher freezer section of supermarkets.

== History ==
In Ashkenazi Jewish homes, kreplach are traditionally served on Rosh Hashanah, at the pre-fast meal before Yom Kippur, and on Hoshana Rabbah and Simchat Torah. According to Kabbalah, it is customary for kreplach to be eaten during the aforementioned observances as they are considered days of judgment, when divine mercy is sought. The meat is said to symbolize the attribute of strict justice, while the white dough represents kindness and divine compassion. In this way, Ashkenazi Jews symbolically ask God to envelop the severity of judgment with mercy.

Kreplach with vegetarian or dairy fillings are also eaten on Purim because the hidden nature of the kreplach interior mimics the "hidden" nature of the Purim miracle. In many communities, meat-filled kreplach are served on Purim. A variety with a sweet cheese filling is served as a starter or main dish in dairy meals, specifically on Shavuot. Fried kreplach are also a popular dish on Chanukah because they are fried in oil, which references the oil miracle of Chanukah.

Stuffed pasta may have migrated from Venice to the Ashkenazi Jews in Germany during the 14th century.

== Name ==
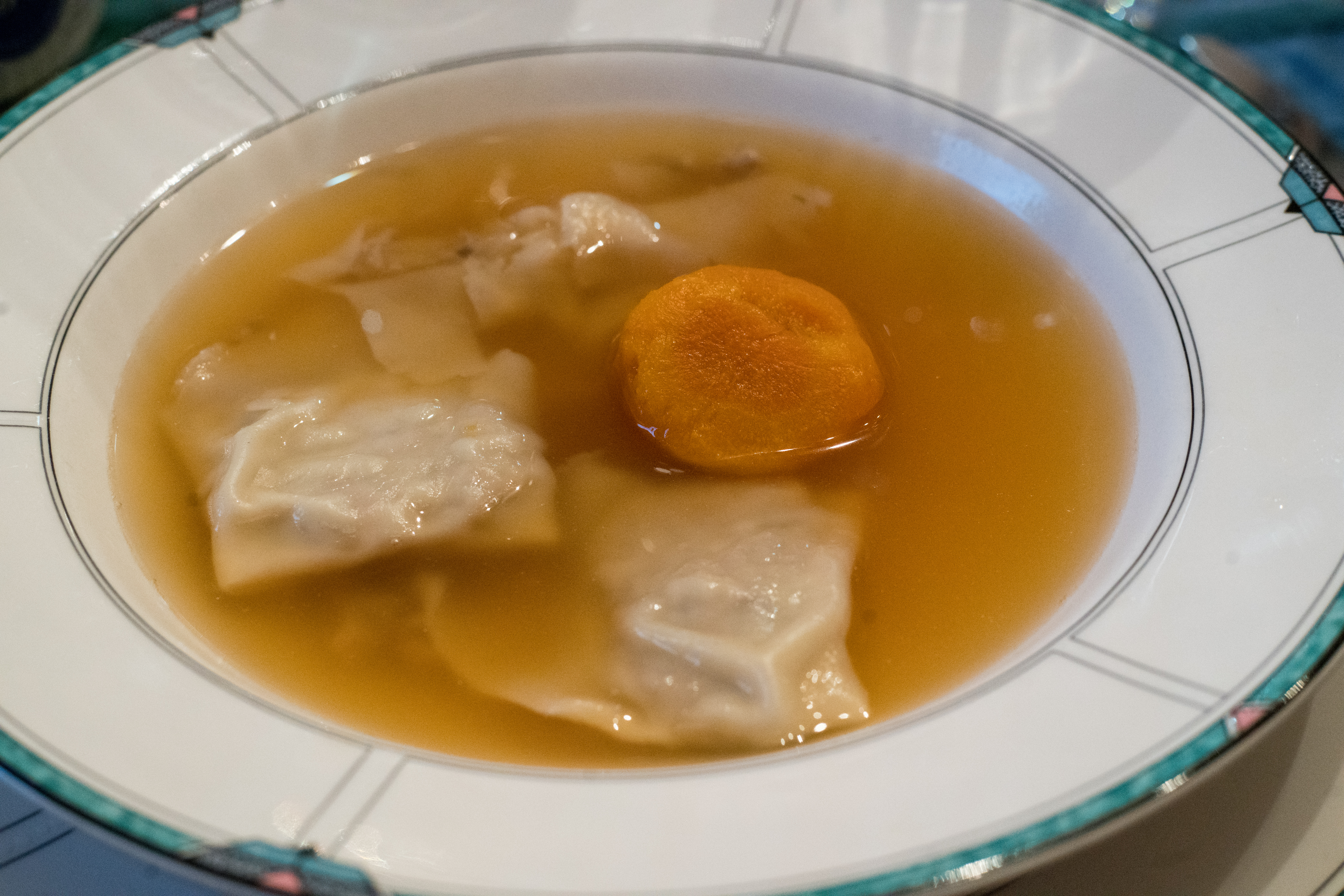
kreplach soup

The Yiddish word קרעפלעך kreplekh or קרעפּלאַך kreplakh is the plural of krepl, a diminutive of krap, which comes from Yiddish's ancestor language Middle High German, where krappe, krapfe meant "a piece of pastry".

From the same source come the German Krapfen ("deep-fried pastry") and its East Central German dialectal variant Kräppel, as well the Silesian Krepel ("doughnut").

By folk etymology, the name has been sometimes explained as standing for the initials of three Jewish holidays which are not real holidays; therefore the meat is covered in dough: K for (Eve of Yom) Kippur, R for (Hoshaana) Rabbah, and P for Purim, which together form the word KReP. However, this hypothesis ignores that Kippur is spelled with a כִּ (kaf) and kreplach with a ק (qof).

== Shape ==
Some cooks use a square of dough that is filled and folded into triangles. Others use rounds of dough resulting in a crescent shape, or two squares of dough.

== See also ==
- Ravioli
- Joshpara
- Jewish cuisine
- List of dumplings
- Maultaschen
