= Maultasche =

Swabian meat-filled dumpling

Maultaschen
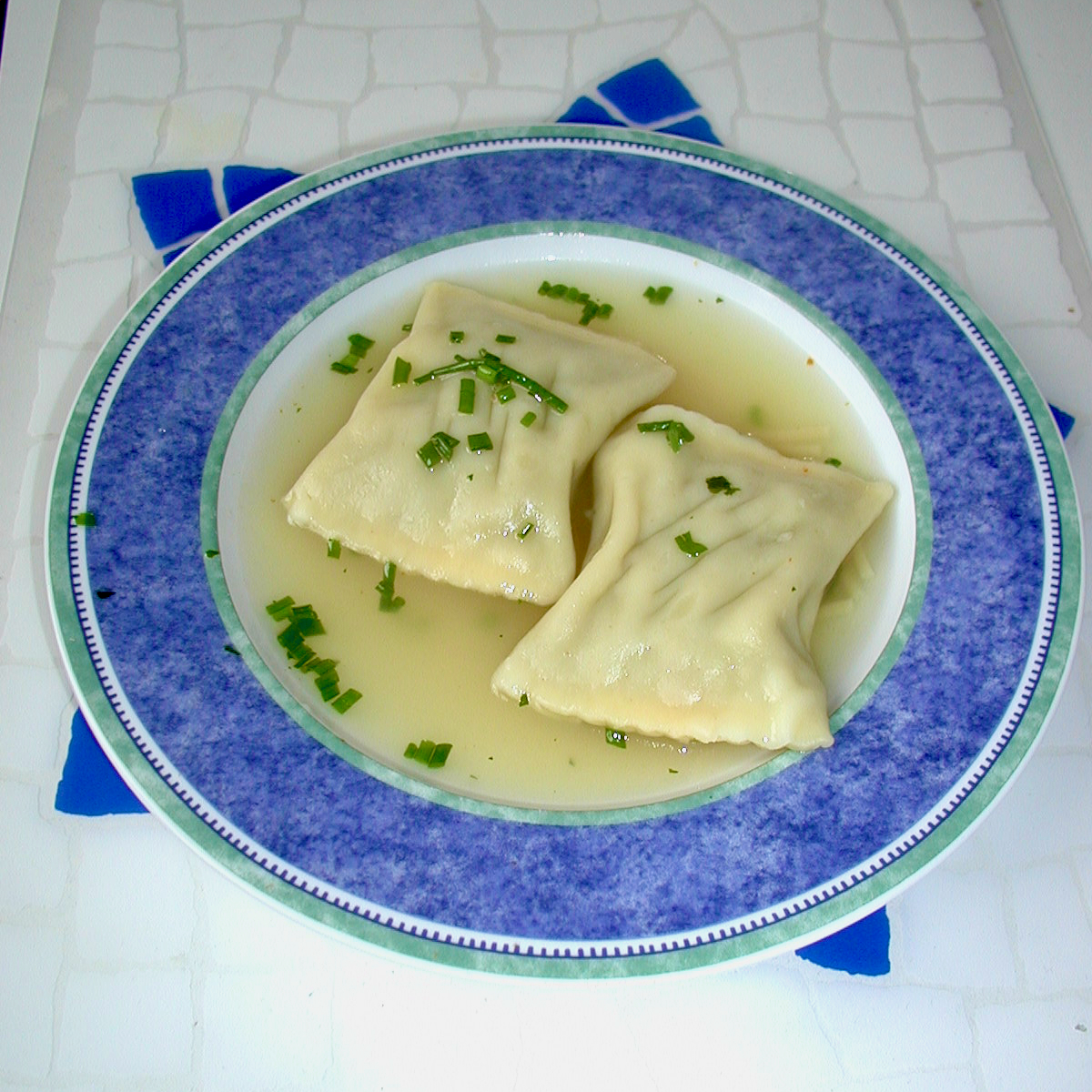
- Type: Pasta
- Place of origin: Germany
- Region or state: Swabia
- Main ingredients: Pasta dough, minced meat, smoked meat, spinach, bread crumbs, onions

Maultaschen (German: [ˈmaʊ̯lˌtaʃn̩]; singular Maultasche, lit. 'mouth pockets') are large meat-filled dumplings in Swabian cuisine. They consist of square sheets of pasta dough filled with minced meat, smoked meat, spinach, bread crumbs and onions, and flavored with herbs and spices such as black pepper, parsley and nutmeg.

The European Union has recognized Maultaschen (Schwäbische Maultaschen or Schwäbische Suppenmaultaschen) as a Protected Geographical Indication (PGI) and remarked that the dish is significant to the cultural heritage of Swabia. This measure provides protection to the integrity of the dish, mandating that genuine Maultaschen are only produced in Swabia, a historical region that was incorporated into the modern German states of Baden-Württemberg and Bavaria.

== History ==
In Swabia, Maultaschen are the traditional dish associated with the Lenten commemoration of Maundy Thursday and Good Friday. During Lent, Catholics and other Christians are encouraged to refrain from eating meat. However, Maultaschen are humorously associated with these days because the meat in the dish is concealed under the pasta dough and cannot be seen by God. Among the anecdotal stories regarding the origin of the dish, one claims that Maultaschen were created by the Cistercian monks of Maulbronn Abbey for that purpose. The Swabian German nickname for the dish, Herrgottsbescheißerle, means "small God-cheaters".

Maultaschen are an integral part of Swabian cultural heritage and identity. Freiberg am Neckar hosts an annual 'Maultaschen festival' and the municipality of Baiersbronn elects a 'Maultaschen queen'. Beginning in 2025, another annual Maultaschen-festival (called Maultaschen-Fäschdival) which features nearly 50 booths offering over 150 different variations of the dish is held in the city of Metzingen in Swabia. The Swabian author Thaddäus Troll likened the Swabian people's identity to a Maultasche, describing them as "außen pfui und innen hui" (literally "yuck on the outside and woohoo on the inside").

In 2018, Lufthansa developed a range of space food based on Swabian dishes, including Maultaschen, for German astronaut Alexander Gerst to consume on the International Space Station and subsequently added them to its airline passenger menu. Industrially-produced Maultaschen saw a nationwide rise in popularity during the COVID-19 pandemic, particularly due to an increase in demand for convenience food. According to estimates, the average German consumes around 7 Maultaschen per year, while the average person from Baden-Württemberg consumes about 32.

=== Etymology ===
The earliest use of the word Maultasche can be found in Martin Luther's transcriptions dating back to the 16th century where it is used as a synonym for a slap in the face. A similar term, Maultatschen, has also been in use. In this context, Maul can be translated as "mouth," while tatschen or tätschen is a verb meaning to hit or slap.

The dish was given its name later. Kluge's Etymological Dictionary of the German Language suggests that its name may derive from this origin or that the shape of one of the dumplings alludes to the filled "cheeks of a hamster" (Tasche can also be translated as "pouch", hence the compound word would mean mouth pouch) or that of a similar animal. According to Johann Georg Krünitz's encyclopedia of 1802, the dish was also called Maulschellen, another term for a slap to the face. A German-Italian dictionary published in 1885 translates the Italian raviolo as Maultasche.

The term Maultaschen was historically also used to describe various other dishes as well as baked goods in different regions. A cookbook originating in Leipzig in 1794 lists several recipe by this name. An encyclopedia from 1802 defines Maultasche as a sweet pastry, and a Darmstadt recipe book from 1858 describes it as a rectangular tart filled with almonds. The Brothers Grimm write in their 1885 Deutsches Wörterbuch (lit. 'German dictionary') that Maultaschen may both refer to a baked pastry in Silesia and a type of filled noodle in Swabia.

== Composition and preparation ==
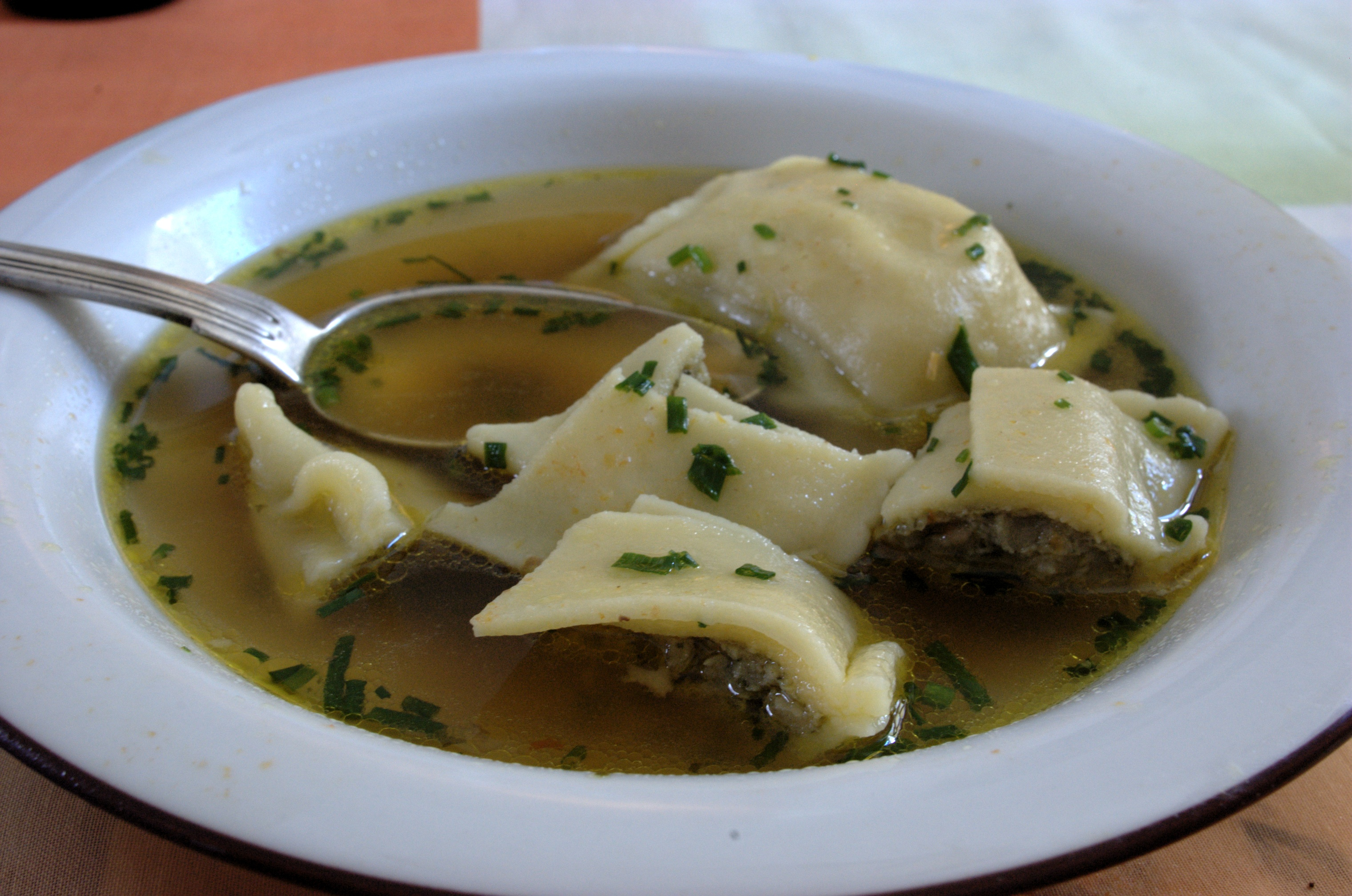
Maultaschen are typically served as Maultaschensuppe in broth

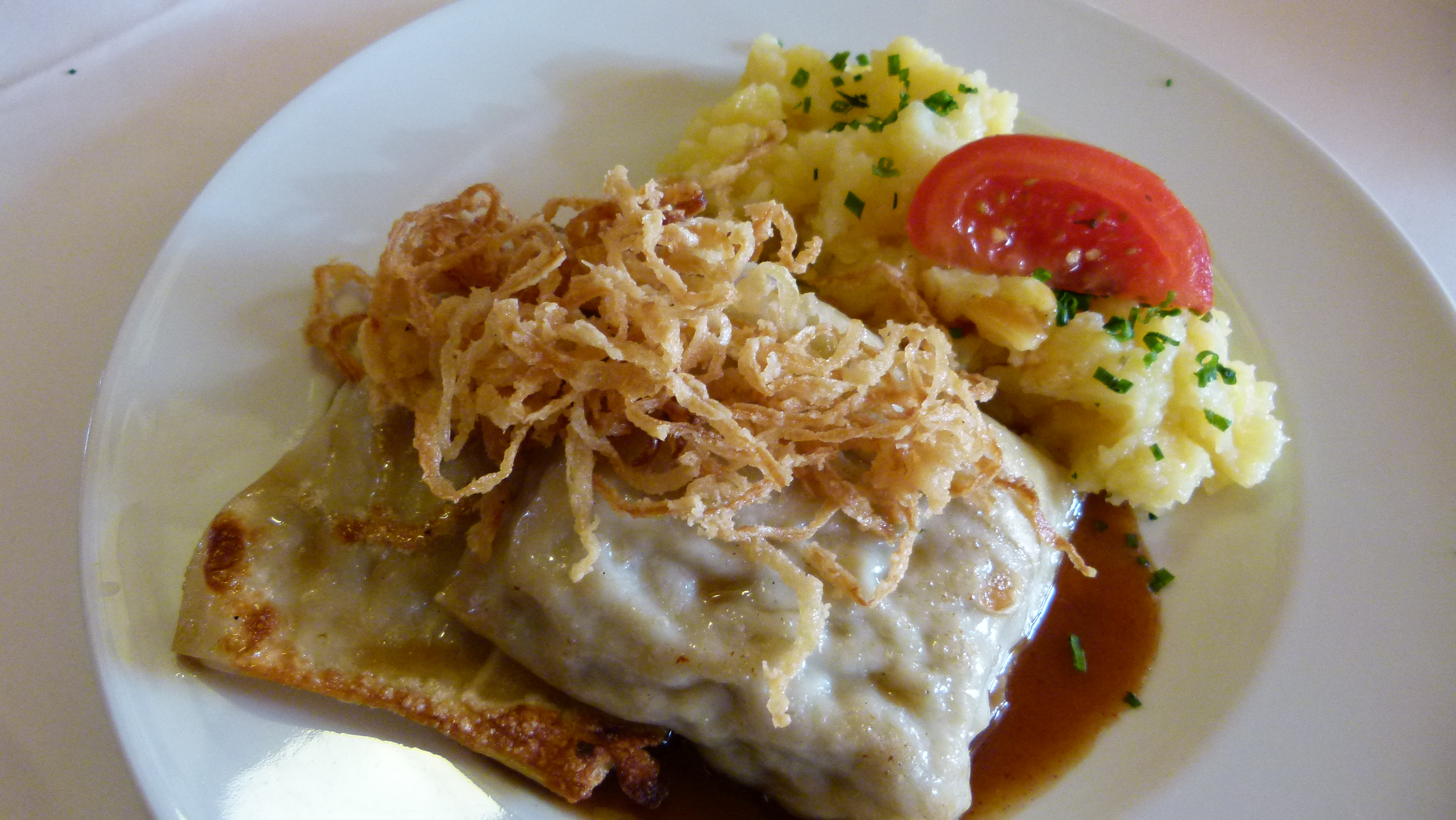
Or sautéed with onions

The composition production region of Maultaschen are defined in one of the European Union's schemes for protected geographical indications. They are classified as consisting of a soft meat or vegetable filling wrapped in a firm dough casing which must contain whole egg, water, and flour or meal from durum wheat or spelt.

The filling may either consist of minced pork, beef and/or veal meat or minced vegetables native to Swabia such as parsnips, leek, ramson, among others. Less traditional recipes use venison or blood sausage, among others, for the meat filling.

They are traditionally served as Suppenmaultaschen in a soup after being boiled in broth or, alternatively, sautéed (geschmälzt) with butter and onions. Suppenmaultaschen are typically smaller and lighter than regular Maultaschen.

== See also ==
- German cuisine
- List of German dishes
- List of stuffed dishes
- Ravioli
- Wonton
- Kreplach
