= Ravioli =

Type of filled pasta

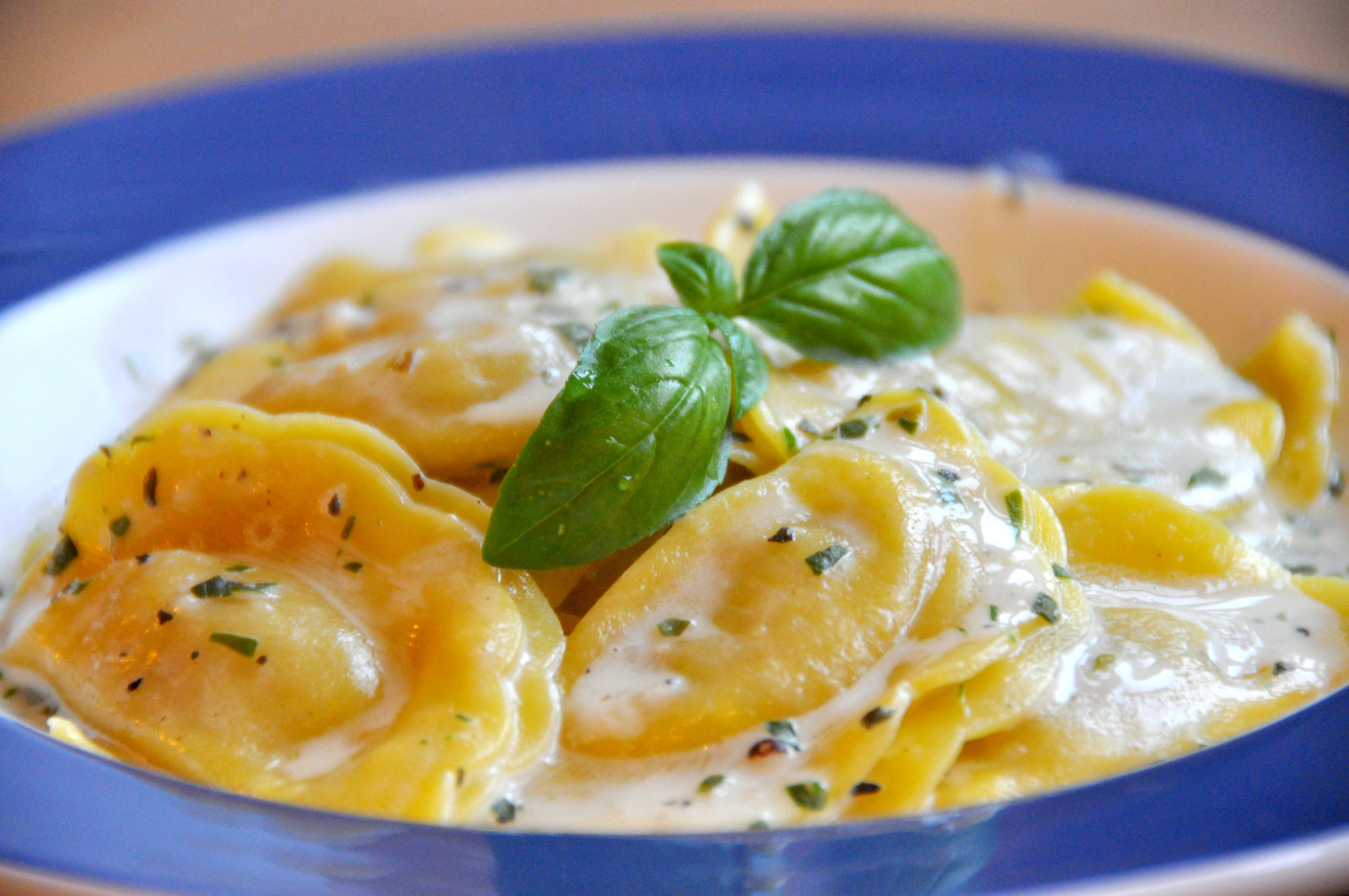
- Ravioli with mascarpone sauce
- Type: Pasta
- Place of origin: Italy
- Main ingredients: Flour, eggs, water, filling

Ravioli (Italian: [raviˈɔli]; sing.: raviolo, Italian: [raviˈɔlo]) are a type of stuffed pasta comprising a filling enveloped in thin pasta dough. Usually served in broth or with a sauce, they originated as a traditional food in Italian cuisine. Ravioli are commonly square, though other forms are also used, including circular and semi-circular (mezzelune).

Ravioli appear in the 14th-century cookbook The Forme of Cury under the name of rauioles.

== Etymology ==
English and French borrowed the word ravioli from Italian in the 14th century. The ultimate origin of the word is uncertain. It is sometimes connected to the northern Italian word rava, 'turnip', supposing that the filling was made of turnips, but the earliest recipes, even Lenten ones, do not include turnips. Another theory connects it to a kind of cheese (related to modern Italian robiola), but that also appears unlikely.

== History ==
Ravioli are mentioned in the personal letters of Francesco Datini, a merchant of Prato in the 14th century. In Venice, the mid-14th-century manuscript Libro per cuoco offers ravioli of green herbs blanched and minced, mixed with beaten egg and fresh cheese, simmered in broth and seasoned with "sweet and strong spices". In Rome, ravioli were already well known when Bartolomeo Scappi served them with boiled chicken to the papal conclave of 1549.

== Overview ==
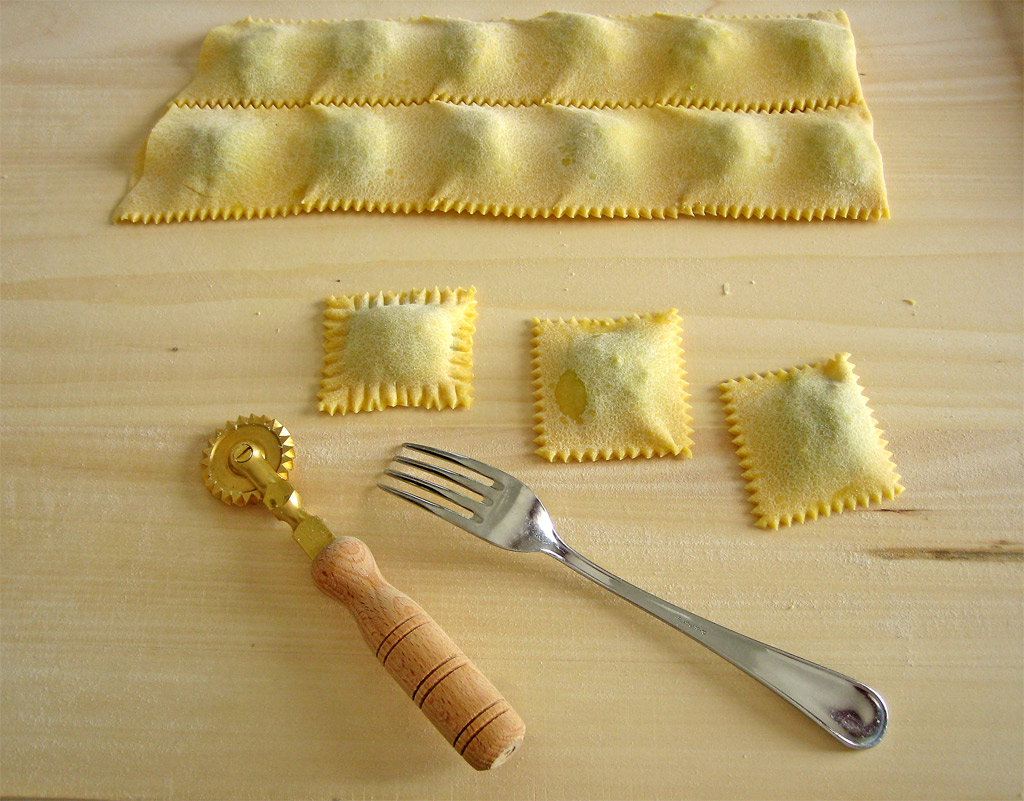
Making of ravioli

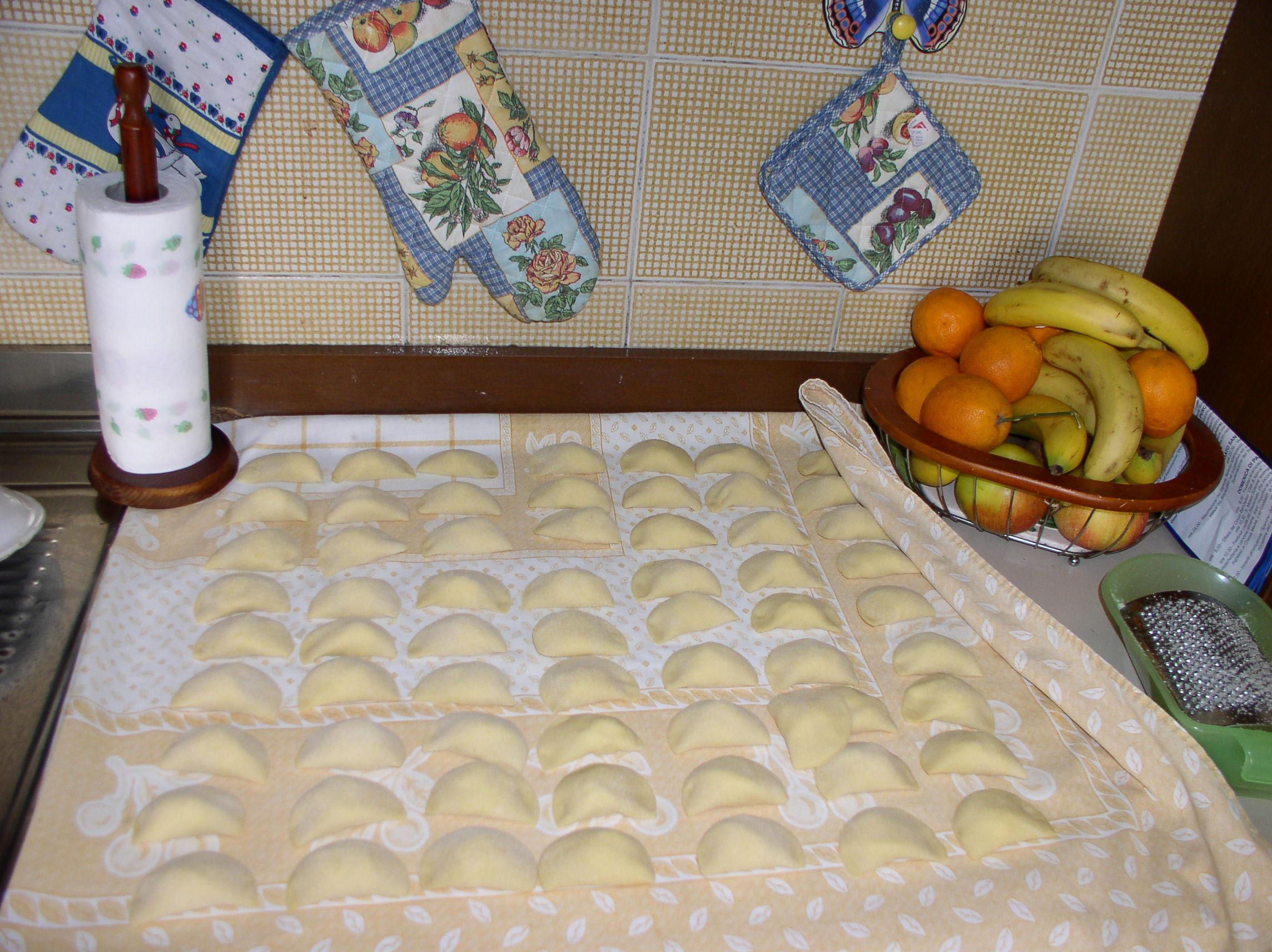
Preparation of home-made ravioli with ricotta cheese

Traditionally, ravioli are made at home. The filling varies according to the area where they are prepared. In Rome and Latium, the filling is made with ricotta cheese, spinach, nutmeg and black pepper. In Sardinia, ravioli are filled with ricotta and grated lemon rind. Ravioli filled with an egg yolk set on a bed of mascarpone or ricotta are called raviolo al'uovo.

In Campania, ravioli are generally round and filled with ricotta. Unlike other parts of Italy, they omit parsley. The pasta is usually made of water and flour, and sometimes eggs. In summer, they are frequently eaten with a tomato sauce, and in winter, ragù.

Modern ravioli are also mass-produced by machine.

== Around the world ==
In Europe and the United States, fresh-packed ravioli have several weeks of shelf life. Canned ravioli were pioneered by the Italian Army in the First World War and were popularized by Heinz and Buitoni in the UK and Europe, and Chef Boyardee in the United States. Canned ravioli may be filled with beef, processed cheese, chicken, or Italian sausage and served in a tomato, tomato-meat, or tomato-cheese sauce. Toasted ravioli (ravioli that have been breaded and deep-fried) was developed in St. Louis, Missouri, and is a popular appetizer and snack food.

Ravioli are commonly encountered in the cooking of Nice, the broader Côte d'Azur, and the surrounding regions in the south of France. The contents of these vary greatly, but most idiosyncratic to the region is the use of leftover daube meat. Miniaturized cheese-filled ravioli, locally called raviole du Dauphiné, are a specialty of the Drôme department in the Rhône-Alpes region, particularly the commune of Romans-sur-Isère, and are frequently served au gratin.

Ravioli filled with halloumi are a traditional pasta dish of Cypriot cuisine. They are boiled in chicken stock and served with grated halloumi and dried mint on top.

== In other cultures ==
In Turkey, manti, similar to ravioli, is a popular dish. It is stuffed with spiced meat and served with paprika sauce and yoghurt. Similar dishes in China are jiaozi or wonton.

In India, a popular dish called gujhia is similar to ravioli. However, it is prepared sweet, with a filling of dry fruits, sugar, and a mixture of sweet spices, then deep-fried in vegetable oil. Different stuffings are used in different parts of India.

Jewish cuisine includes various similar dishes. Ashkenazi Jewish cuisine features kreplach, which are pockets of meat or other fillings encased in egg-pasta dough and simmered in chicken soup. In the Israeli cities of Safed and Tiberias, there is a comparable dish called calsones (pronounced caltzones). These are pockets filled with tzfatit, a locally made sheep's milk cheese. This dish originated in Jewish communities in Spain and Italy, with migrating Jews bringing it to Syria and then Israel, where it became a Shavuot staple.

A similar Middle Eastern dish called shishbarak contains pasta filled with minced beef meat and cooked in hot yogurt.

In Argentina, sorrentinos are large ravioli typically stuffed with ham or minced meat and cheese and served with a tomato and meat sauce.

== See also ==
- List of pasta
- List of pasta dishes
- List of dumplings
