= Ashkenazi Jewish cuisine =

Cooking traditions among Ashkenazi Jews

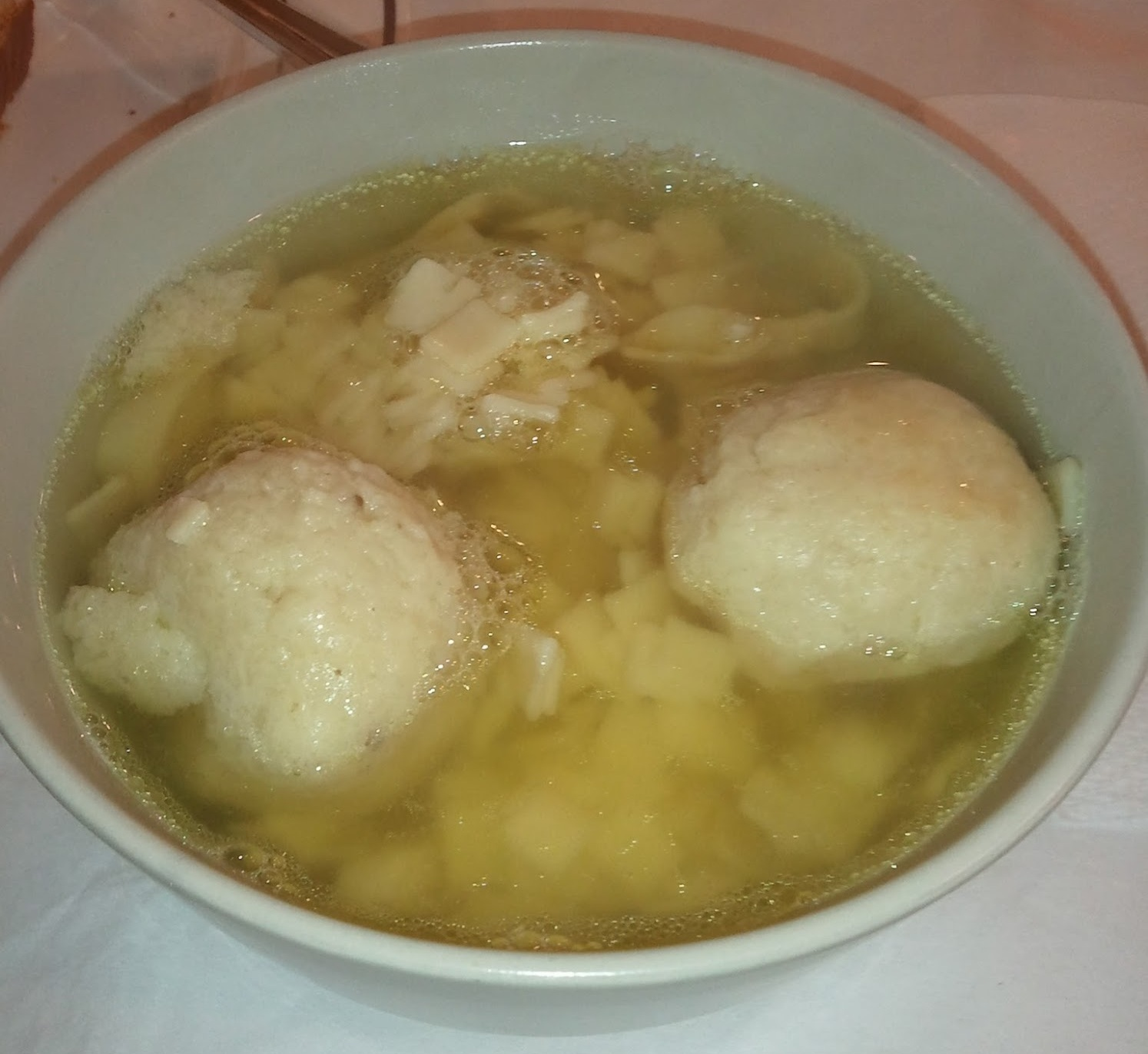
Matzoh ball soup with lokshen (egg noodles) and farfel

Ashkenazi Jewish cuisine is an assortment of cooking traditions that was developed by the Ashkenazi Jews of Central, Eastern, Northwestern and Northern Europe, and their descendants, particularly in the United States and other Western countries.

Ashkenazi Jewish foods have frequently been unique to Ashkenazi Jewish communities, and they often consist of local ingredients (such as beets, cabbage, and potato). While these ingredients tended to be the same as those in local or neighbouring non-Jewish communities, the preparation methods were very different due to kashrut, which was historically enforced by a law, and a history of limited interaction between Ashkenazi Jews and non-Jews.

The cuisine is largely based on ingredients that were affordable to the historically poor Ashkenazi Jewish community of Europe, and it is frequently composed of ingredients that were readily available and affordable in the regions and communities of Europe in which Ashkenazi Jews lived. Some ingredients were considered less desirable than other ingredients, such as brisket, chicken liver, and artichokes, among other ingredients, and as a result, these items were rarely used by gentile neighbours of Ashkenazi Jews.

Meat is ritually slaughtered in the shechita process, and it is also soaked and salted. Meat dishes are a prominent feature of Shabbat, festivals, and celebratory meals. Braised meats such as brisket feature heavily, as do root vegetables such as potatoes, carrots, and parsnips which are used in such dishes as latkes, matzo ball soup, and tzimmes (a braised fruit and vegetable dish which may also contain meat). Cooked, stuffed, and baked vegetables such as stuffed cabbage and, in some regions, stuffed peppers are central to the cuisine.

Due to the lack of availability of olive oil and other fats which are commonplace in Jewish cooking, rendered fat from leftover poultry skins (gribenes) called schmaltz is used in fleishig (meat) dishes, while butter is traditionally used in milchig (dairy) dishes. Since the advent of mass-produced vegetable oils (particularly in the United States and Canada) such as canola oil, many baked goods have been made with oils rather than butter, to render them pareve.

== History ==
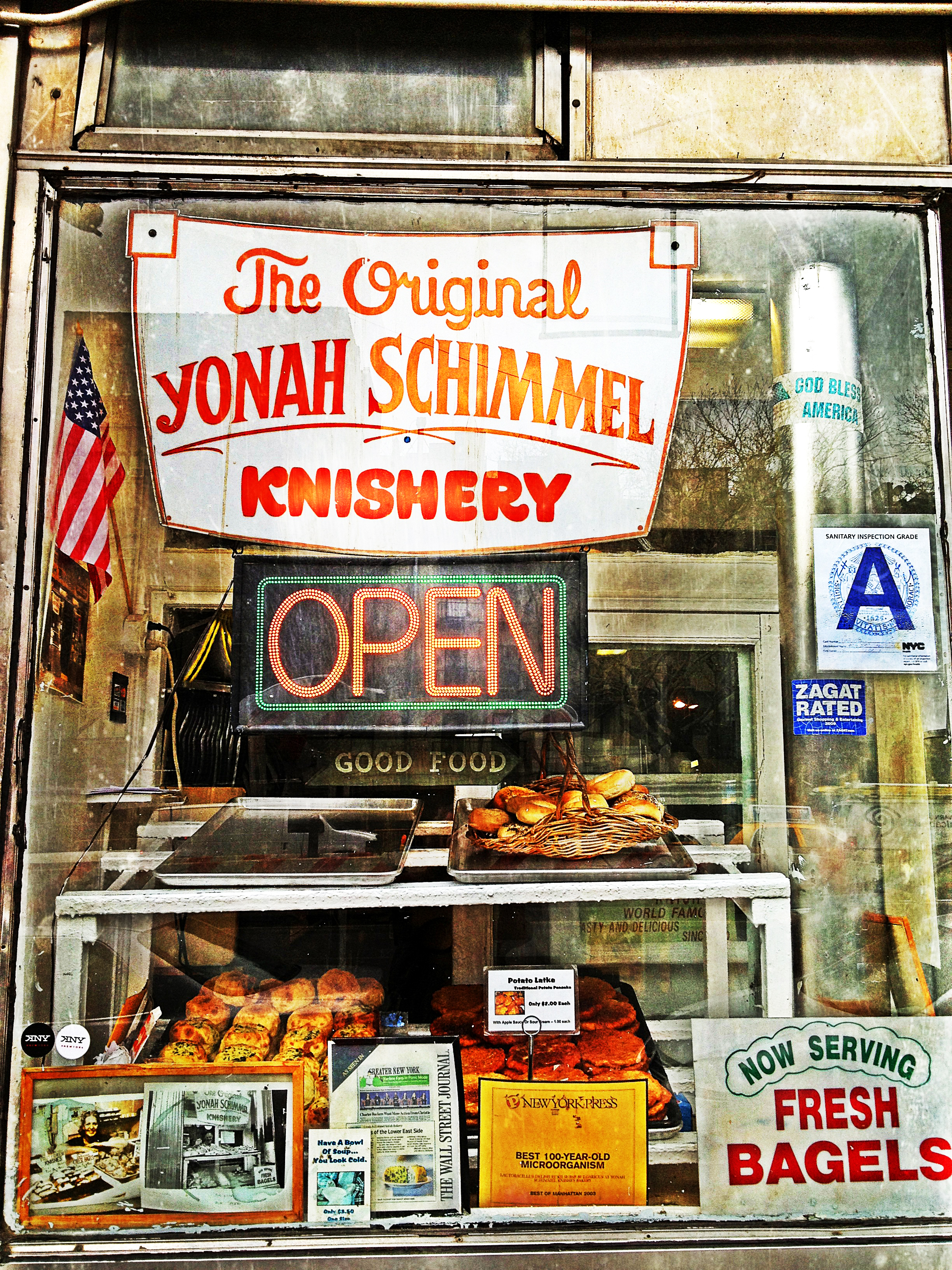
Yonah Schimmel's Knish Bakery

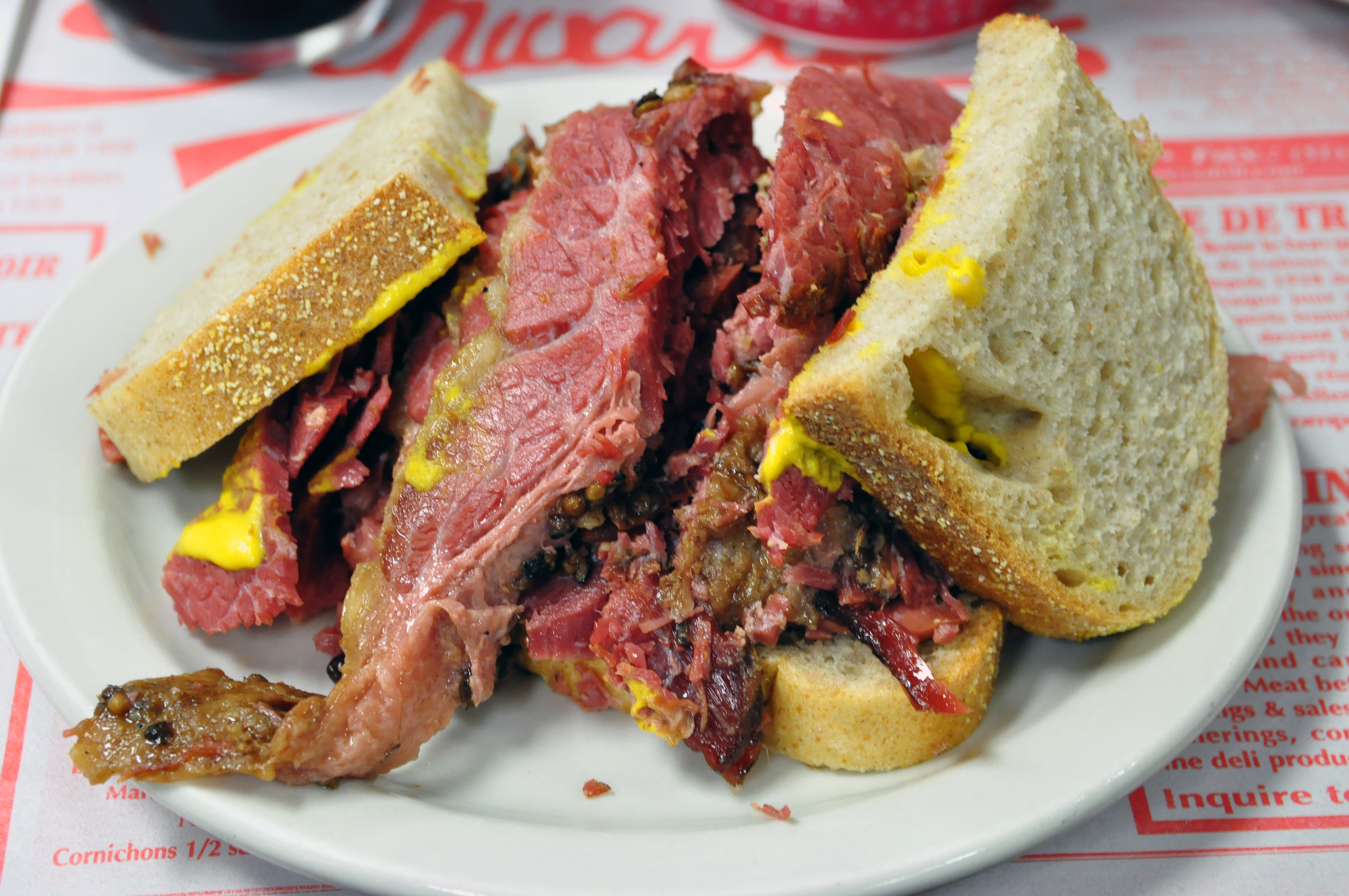
Montreal-style smoked meat from Schwartz's

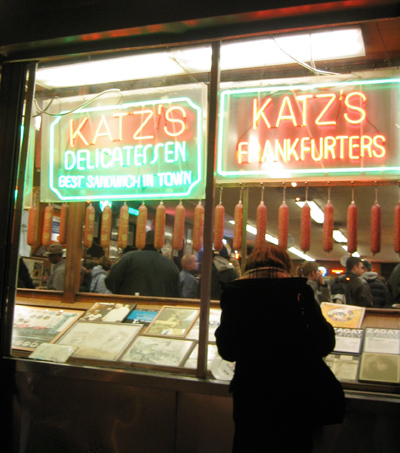
Katz's Deli

The cuisine of the Ashkenazi Jews is reflective of their journey from Central Europe to Eastern Europe and then throughout the world, especially to Israel, Western Europe and the Anglosphere. Ashkenazi Jews are a Jewish diaspora population which coalesced in the Holy Roman Empire around the end of the first millennium CE. This population progressively migrated eastward, and established population centres in the Polish–Lithuanian Commonwealth (a nation which then consisted of territories currently located in parts of present-day Belarus, Estonia, Latvia, Lithuania, Moldova, Poland, Russia, Slovakia, and Ukraine). Ashkenazi communities have also historically been present in the Banat, a region in central and eastern Europe that consists of parts of present-day Serbia, Romania, and Hungary. As a result, the cuisine of Ashkenazi Jews was highly regional in the past, and has also been influenced by a diverse range of European cooking traditions, including German, French, Italian, Slavic, and Ottoman cuisines.

A common refrain is that the food of Ashkenazi Jews is the food of poverty. Jews in Europe generally lived at the sufferance of the gentile rulers of the lands in which they sojourned, and they were frequently subjected to antisemitic laws that, at certain times and in certain places, limited their participation in the regular economy, or in land ownership and farming. This situation forced many Jews into intergenerational poverty, with the result being that for many Jews, only basic staples were available. Luxury items like meat and imported foods such as spices were not commonplace for anyone but the wealthy. However, the wealthy had access to imported goods like spices, olive oil, and exotic fruits, and they could eat meat more frequently.

While the majority of Jews who have been living in the Western Levant and Turkey since the time of the first diaspora have been Sefardic, Mizrahi, and other non-Ashkenazi Jews, Ashkenazi communities also existed among the Jewish communities of the southern Syrian provinces in the Ottoman period (the Old Yishuv), and Turkey. Evidence of cross-cultural culinary exchange between Ottoman and Ashkenazi cuisines can be seen most readily in the food of Jews in the Banat, Romania, and Moldova, particularly pastrami and karnatzel.

A stereotype of Ashkenazi food is that it contains few vegetables relative to other Jewish cuisines. While there is some truth to this allegation, it was most true in the late 19th and early 20th centuries, a period during which many eastern European Ashkenazi Jews experienced particularly extreme deprivation (including in terms of the availability of food), that coincided with the advent of industrial food processing. "Modern kitchen science" and industrial food processing continued and accelerated into the mid-20th century in the United States, leading to a narrowing of the culinary repertoire and a heavier reliance on processed shelf-stable foods.

Root vegetables such as turnips, beets, parsnips, carrots, black radish and potatoes historically made up a large portion of the Ashkenazi diet in Europe. The potato – indigenous to the Americas – had an enormous impact on Ashkenazi cuisine, though it reached most Ashkenazi Jews only in the second half of the 19th century. Other vegetables commonly eaten were cabbage, cucumbers, sorrel, horseradish, and in the Banat, tomatoes and peppers. Cabbage, cucumbers, and other vegetables were frequently preserved through pickling or fermentation. Fruits include stone fruits such as plums and apricots, apples and pears, and berries, which were eaten fresh or preserved. Raisins are also historically an integral part of Ashkenazi cuisine since the 14th century. Staple grains included barley, rye, buckwheat and wheat; barley and buckwheat were generally cooked whole by boiling the grains/groats in water, while rye and wheat were ground into flour and used to make breads and other baked goods. Dairy products were common, including sour cream, and cheeses such as farmer's cheese and brindze, and kashkaval in southeastern regions. Nuts such as almonds and walnuts were eaten as well. Mushrooms were foraged or purchased.

In North America in the 20th century, Ashkenazi food became blander and less regionally-distinct than it had been in Europe, due primarily to the unavailability of certain ingredients and staple foods, the advent of industrial food processing and modern kitchen science, poverty and pressures to assimilate. In the early 21st century, however, increased interest in heritage and food history, including that of Ashkenazi Jews, has resulted in efforts to revitalize this cuisine.

== Dishes ==
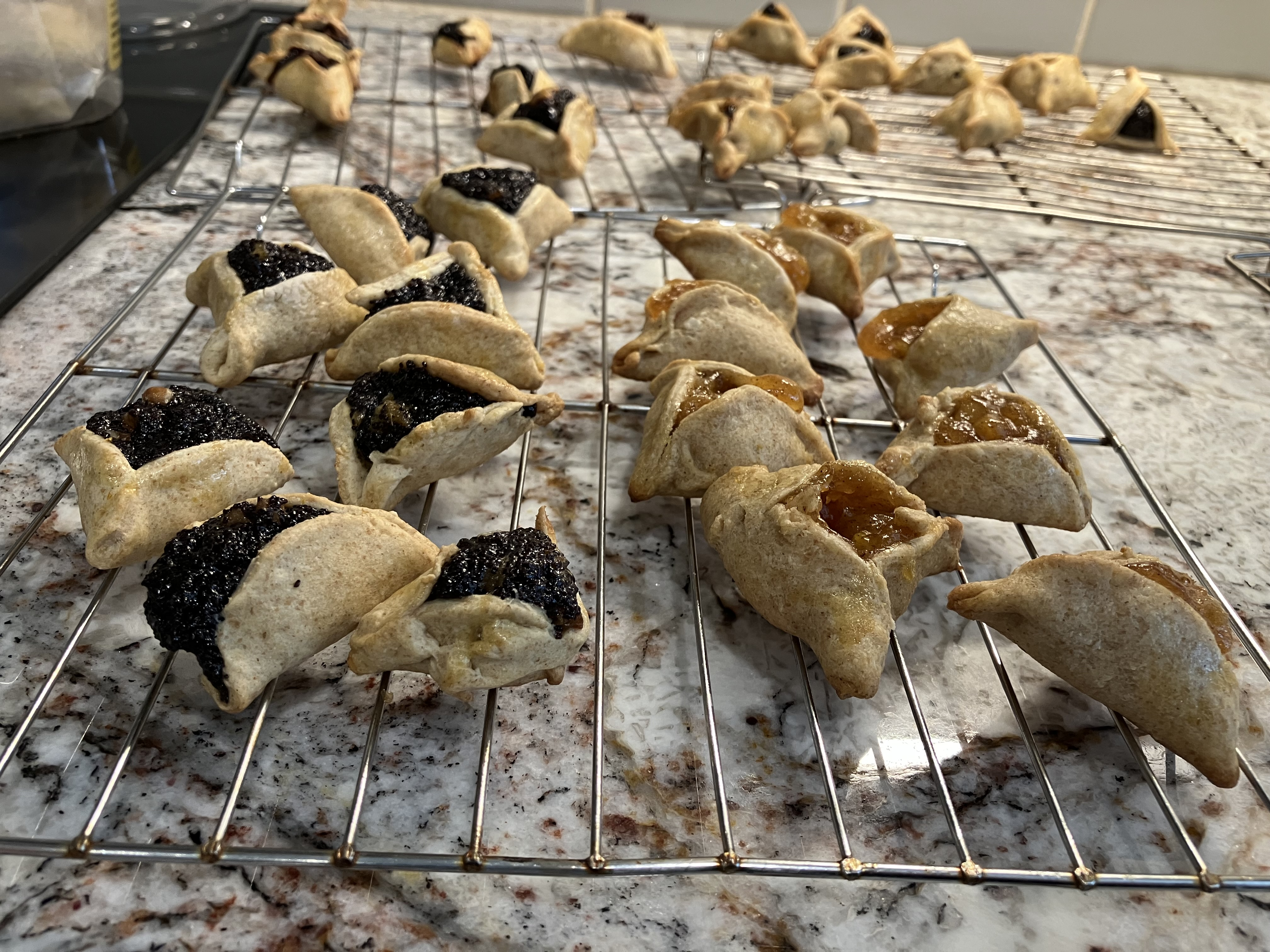
Hamantashen

=== Baked goods ===
The hamentash, a triangular cookie or turnover filled with fruit preserves (lekvar), chocolate or honey, and black poppy seed paste, is eaten on the Feast of Purim. It is said to be shaped like the hat of Haman the tyrant. The mohn kichel is a circular or rectangular wafer sprinkled with poppy seeds. Pirushkes, or turnovers, are little cakes fried in honey or dipped in molasses after they are baked. Strudel is served for dessert.

==== Kugels ====
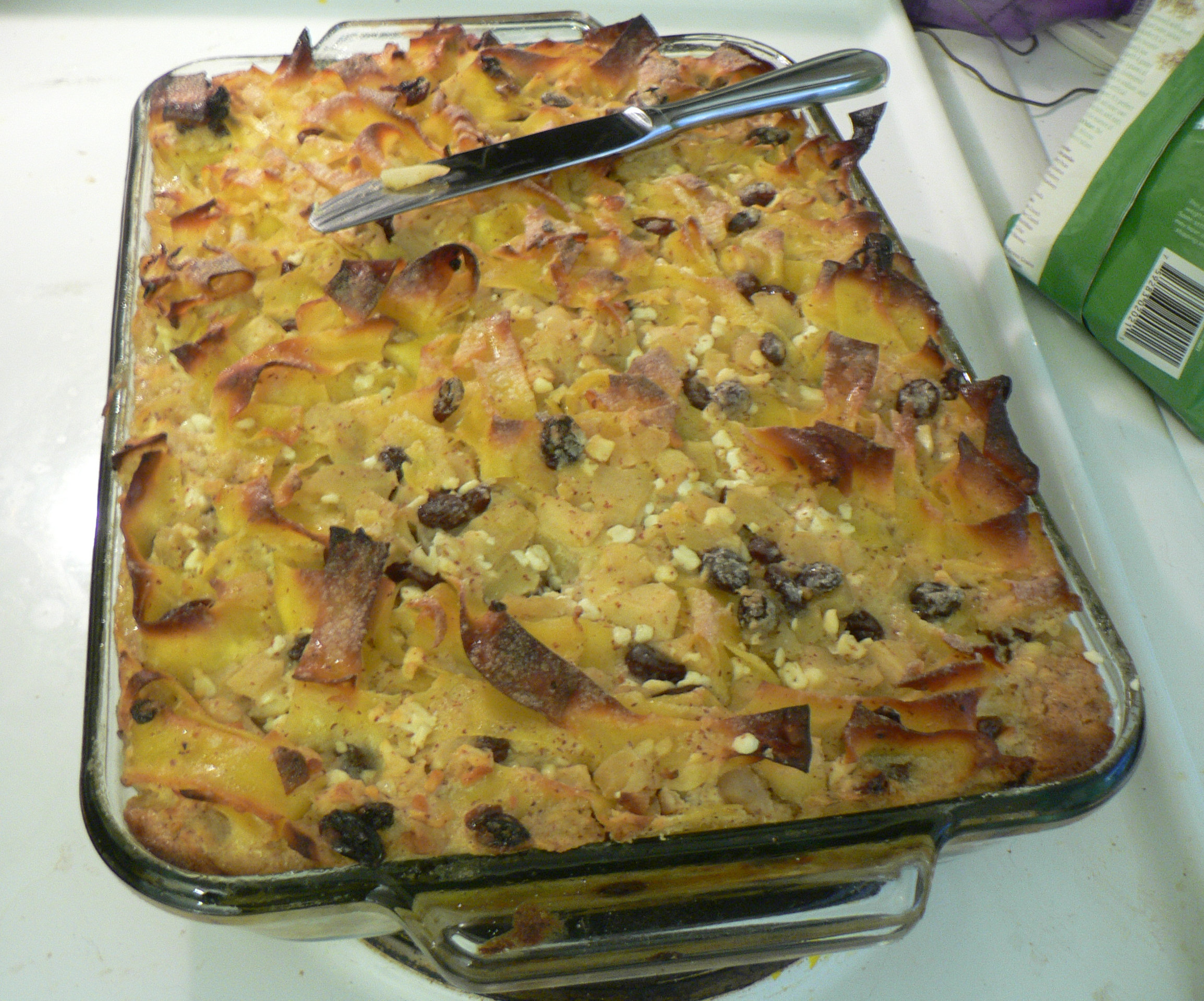
A noodle kugel

Kugels are a type of casserole. They come in two types: noodle or vegetable. Lokshn kugl, or noodle kugel, is usually made from wide egg noodles, eggs, sour cream, raisins, and farmer's cheese, and contains some sugar. Vegetable kugels (bulbenikes) are made from chopped or shredded vegetables, onions, salt, and eggs, with oil or schmaltz. The most prominent variation of kugel is potato kugel. A regional specialty, kugel yerushalmi (Jerusalem kugel) is made from long, thin egg noodles, more sugar than a typical noodle kugel, and large quantities of black pepper. It is usually pareve, whereas noodle kugel is dairy and potato kugel may be either pareve or meat-based (if made with schmaltz). Other vegetable kugels were developed more recently, and are generally pareve.

==== Bread and cake ====
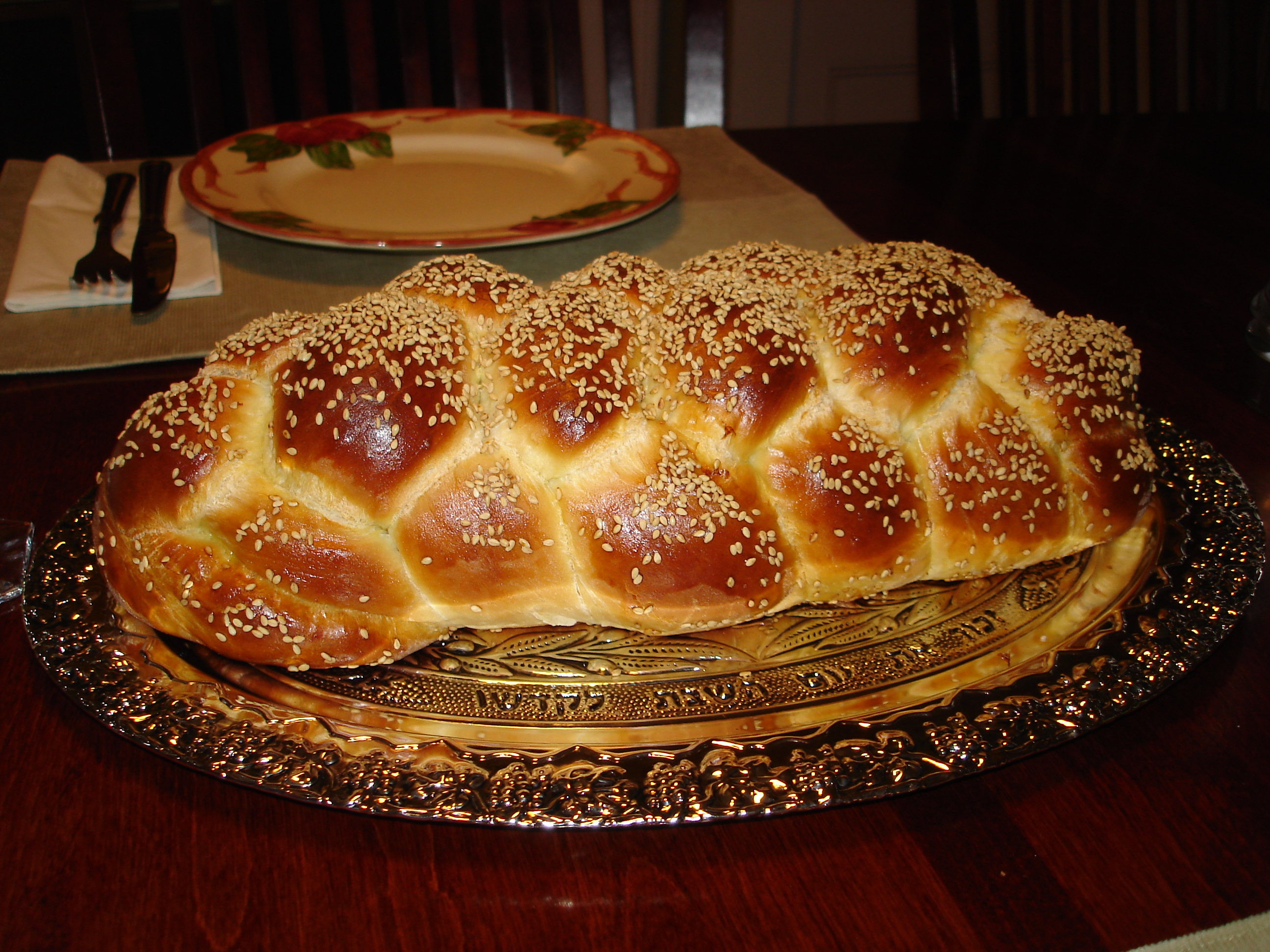
Challah bread

The dough of challah (called barkhes in Western Yiddish, also known as koilitsh) is often shaped into forms having symbolical meanings; thus on Rosh Hashanah rings and coins are imitated, indicating "May the new year be as round and complete as these"; for Hosha'na Rabbah and the shabbes after pesach, bread is baked in the form of a key, meaning "May the door of heaven open to admit our prayers."

In Eastern Europe, the Jews baked black (proster, or "ordinary") bread, white bread, and challah. The most common form is the twist (koilitch or kidke from the Romanian word încolăci which means "to twist"). The koilitch is oval and about one and a half feet. On special occasions, such as weddings, the koilitch is increased to about two and a half feet.

A ladder-shaped challah is an old custom among Ukrainian Jews for Shavuot. The Torah is likened to a ladder because it serves as a means of spiritual ascent, connecting Heaven and Earth.

The bagel, which originated in Jewish communities of Poland, is a popular Ashkenazi food and became widespread in the United States.

=== Fats ===
Rendered chicken fat, known as schmaltz, is sometimes kept ready for cooking use when needed. Gribenes or "scraps", also called griven, the cracklings left from the rendering process, were one of the favorite foods of the former Jewish community in Eastern Europe. Schmaltz is eaten spread on bread.

=== Fish ===
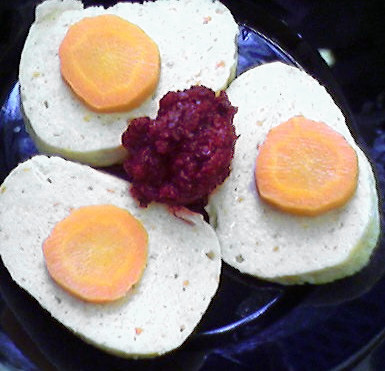
Gefilte fish with carrot slices and chrain

With kosher meat not always available, fish became an important staple of the Jewish diet. In Eastern Europe, it was sometimes especially reserved for Shabbat. As fish is not considered meat in the same way that beef or poultry are, it can also be eaten with dairy products (although some Sephardim do not mix fish and dairy).

Even though fish is parve, when they are served at the same meal, Orthodox Jews will eat them during separate courses and wash (or replace) the dishes in between. Gefilte fish and lox are popular in Ashkenazi cuisine.

Gefilte fish (from German gefüllte "stuffed" fish) was traditionally made by skinning the fish steaks, usually German or French carp, de-boning the flesh, mincing it and sometimes mixing with finely chopped browned onions (3:1), eggs, salt or pepper and vegetable oil. The fish skin and head were then stuffed with the mixture and poached.

The religious reason for a boneless fish dish for Shabbat is the prohibition of separating bones from food while eating (borer).

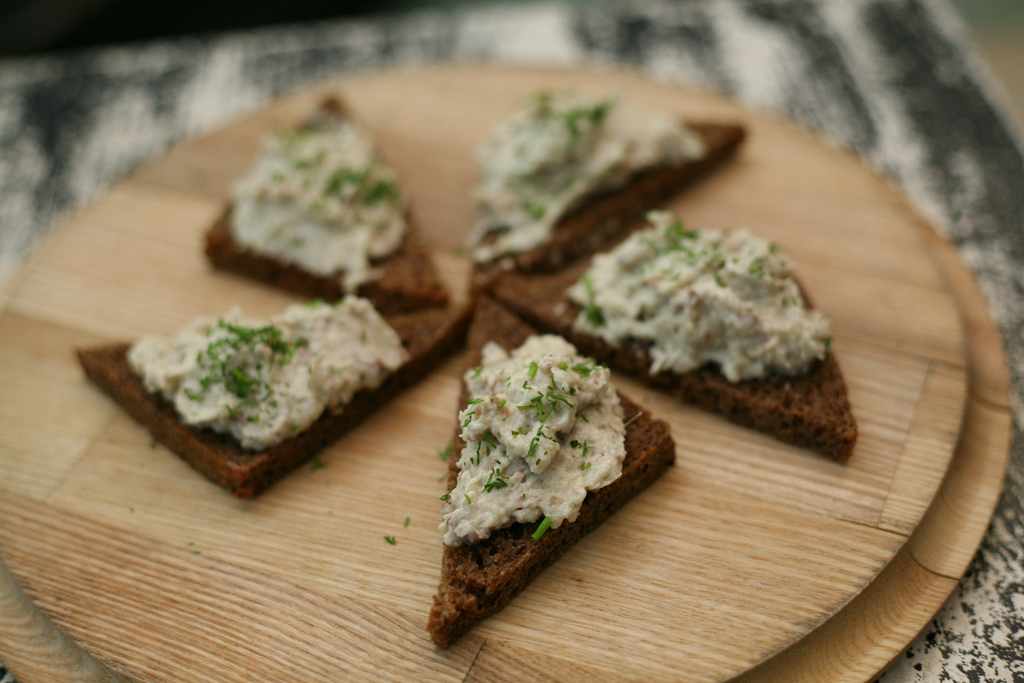
Vorschmack/gehakte herring spread on rye bread

A more common commercially packaged product found today is the "Polish" gefilte-fish patties or balls, similar to quenelles, where sugar is added to the broth, resulting in a slightly sweet taste. Strictly speaking, they are the fish filling, rather than the complete filled fish. This method of serving evolved from the tradition of removing the stuffing from the skin, rather than portioning the entire fish into slices before serving.

While traditionally made with carp or whitefish and sometimes pike, gefilte fish may also be made from any large fish: cod, haddock, or hake in the United Kingdom.

The combination of smoked salmon, or whitefish with bagels and cream cheese is a traditional breakfast or brunch in American Jewish cuisine, made famous at New York City delicatessens.

Vorschmack or gehakte hering (chopped herring), a popular appetizer on Shabbat, is made by chopping skinned, boned herrings with hard-boiled eggs, sometimes onions, apples, sugar or pepper and a dash of vinegar.

Whitefish salad is a spread made of smoked freshwater whitefish and mayonnaise. Whitefish salad is a staple fare of Ashkenazi Jewish American cuisine, often found at appetizing stores and Jewish delicatessens. It is frequently eaten on bagels, crackers or rye bread.

=== Meat ===
Holishkes, stuffed cabbage, also known as the cabbage roll, is also a European Jewish dish that emerged from more impoverished times for Jews. Because having a live cow was more valuable than eating meat in the Middle Ages, Jews used fillers such as breadcrumbs and vegetables to mix with ground beef. This gave the effect of more meat being stuffed into the cabbage leaves.

A spread of chopped liver, prepared with caramelized onions and often including gribenes, is a popular appetizer, side dish, or snack, especially among Jews on the east coast of North America. It is usually served with rye bread or crackers.

Gebratenes (roasted meat), chopped meat and essig-fleisch (vinegar meat) are favorite meat recipes. The essig or, as it is sometimes called, honig or Sauerbraten, is made by adding to meat which has been partially roasted some sugar, bay leaves, pepper, raisins, salt, and a little vinegar.

Knish is a snack food consisting of kasha, potato, spinach, or broccoli filling covered with dough that is either baked or grilled. It is sometimes eaten with a side of apple sauce.

==== Side dishes ====
Tzimmes generally consists of cooked vegetables or fruits, sometimes with meat added. The most popular vegetable is the carrot (mehren tzimes), which is sliced. Turnips are also used for tzimmes, particularly in Lithuania. In southern Russia, Galicia, and Romania, tzimmes are made with pears, apples, figs, prunes, or plums (floymn tzimes).

Kreplach are dumplings made from flour and eggs mixed into a dough, rolled into sheets, cut into squares, and then filled with finely chopped, seasoned meat or cheese. They are most often served in soup, but may be fried. Kreplach are eaten on various holidays, including Purim and Hosha'na Rabbah.

==== Soups ====
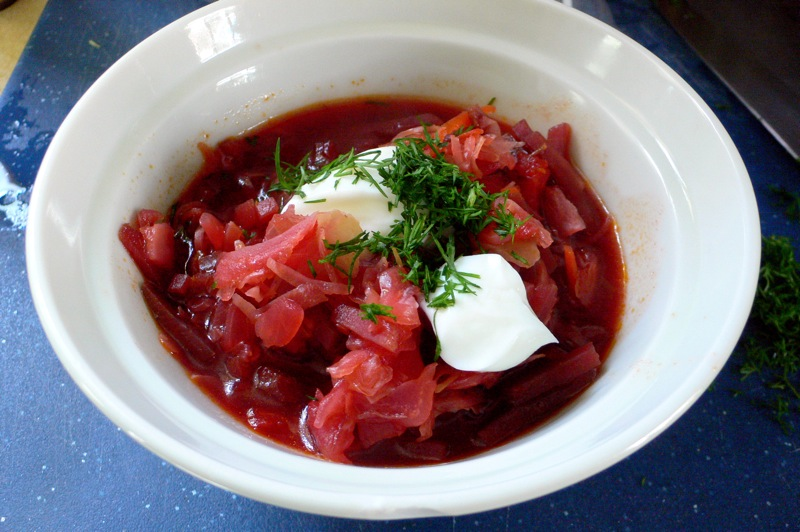
Borscht with sour cream

Several soups are characteristically Ashkenazi, one of the most common of which is chicken soup, traditionally served on Shabbat, holidays, and special occasions. The soup may be served with noodles (lokshen in Yiddish). It is often served with shkedei marak (lit. "soup almonds", croutons popular in Israel), called mandlen or mandlach or perelach in Yiddish. Other popular ingredients are kreplach (dumplings) and matza balls (kneidlach)—a mixture of matza meal, eggs, water, pepper, or salt. Some reserve kneidlach for Passover and kreplach for other special occasions.

In the preparation of a number of soups, neither meat nor fat is used. Such soups formed the food of the poor classes. An expression among Jews of Eastern Europe, soup mit nisht (soup with nothing), owes its origin to soups of this kind.

Soups such as borscht were considered a staple in Ukraine. Shtshav, a soup made with sorrel, was often referred to as "green borscht" or "sour grass". Soups like krupnik were made of barley, potatoes and fat. This was the staple food of the poor students of the yeshivot; in richer families, meat was added to this soup.

At weddings, "golden" chicken soup was often served. The reason for its name is probably the yellow circles of molten chicken fat floating on its surface. Today, chicken soup is widely referred to (not just among Jews) in jest as "Jewish penicillin" and hailed as a cure for the common cold.

There are a number of sour soups in the borscht category. One is kraut or cabbage borscht, made by cooking together cabbage, meat, bones, onions, raisins, sour salt (citric acid), sugar, and sometimes tomatoes.

Beet borscht is served hot or cold. In the cold version, a beaten egg yolk may be added before serving, and each bowl is topped with a dollop of sour cream. This last process is called farweissen (to make white).

Krupnik, or barley soup, originates in Polish lands; its name comes from the Slavic term for hulled grains, krupa. While non-Jewish recipes for krupnik often involve meat (beef, chicken, pork, or a mixture) and dairy (sour cream) in the same recipe, Jewish recipes for meat-based krupnik generally use chicken or (more rarely) beef broth; if made without meat, sour cream may be added.

==== Sweets and confections ====
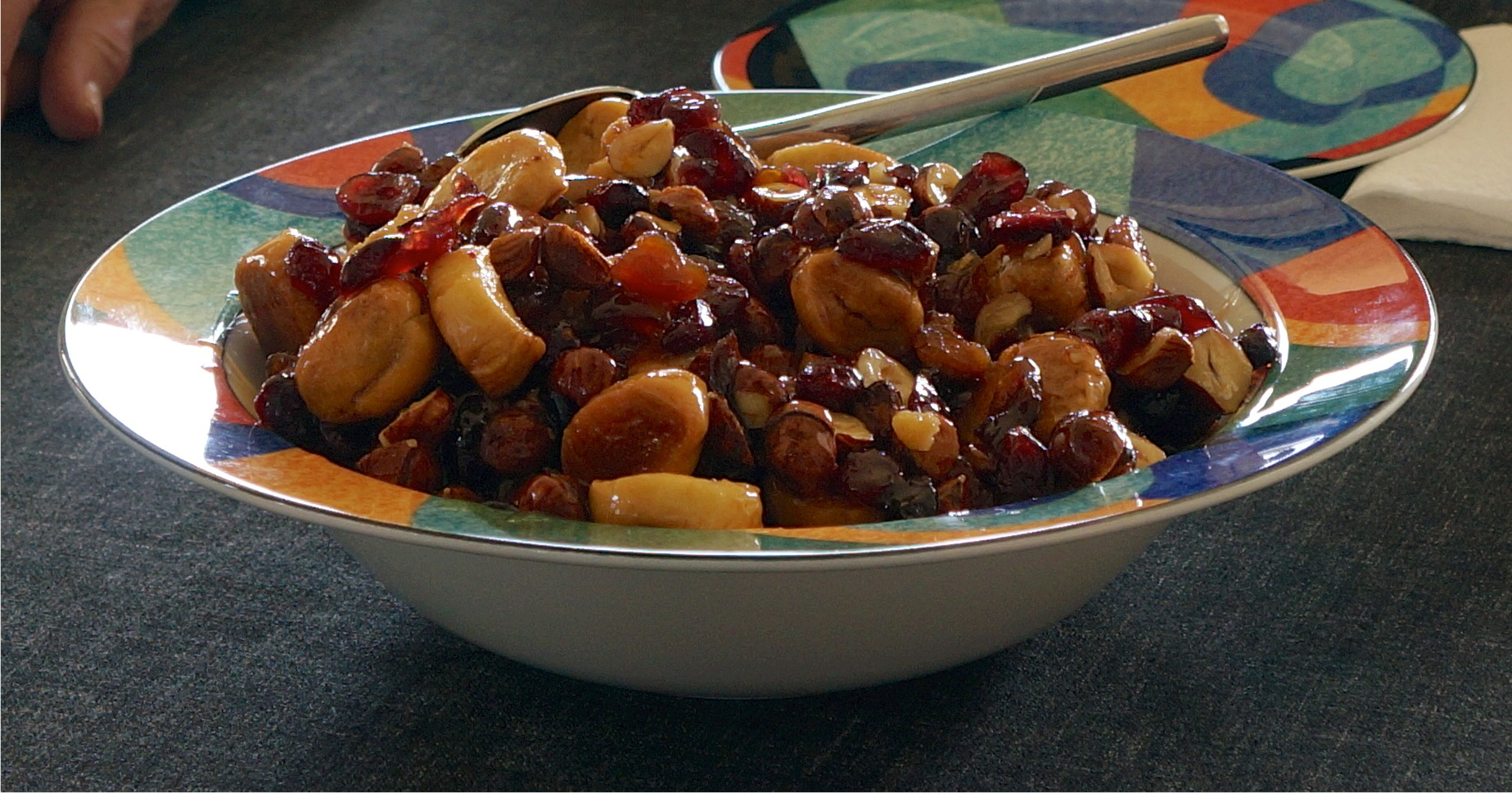
Teiglach

Teiglach, traditionally served on Rosh Hashanah, the Jewish New Year, consists of little balls of dough (about the size of a marble) drenched in a honey syrup. Ingberlach are ginger candies shaped into small sticks or rectangles. Rugelach, babka, and kokosh are popular pastries as well.

In Europe, jellies and preserves made from fruit juice were used as pastry fillings or served with tea. Among the poor, jelly was reserved for invalids, hence the practice of reciting the Yiddish saying Alevay zol men dos nit darfn (May we not have occasion to use it) before storing it away.

Flodni, a layered sweet pastry consisting of apples, walnuts, currants, and poppy seeds, was a staple of Hungarian Jewish bakeries before World War II.

Because it was easy to prepare, made from inexpensive ingredients, and contained no dairy products, compote became a staple dessert in Jewish households throughout Europe and was considered part of Jewish cuisine.

== Gallery ==
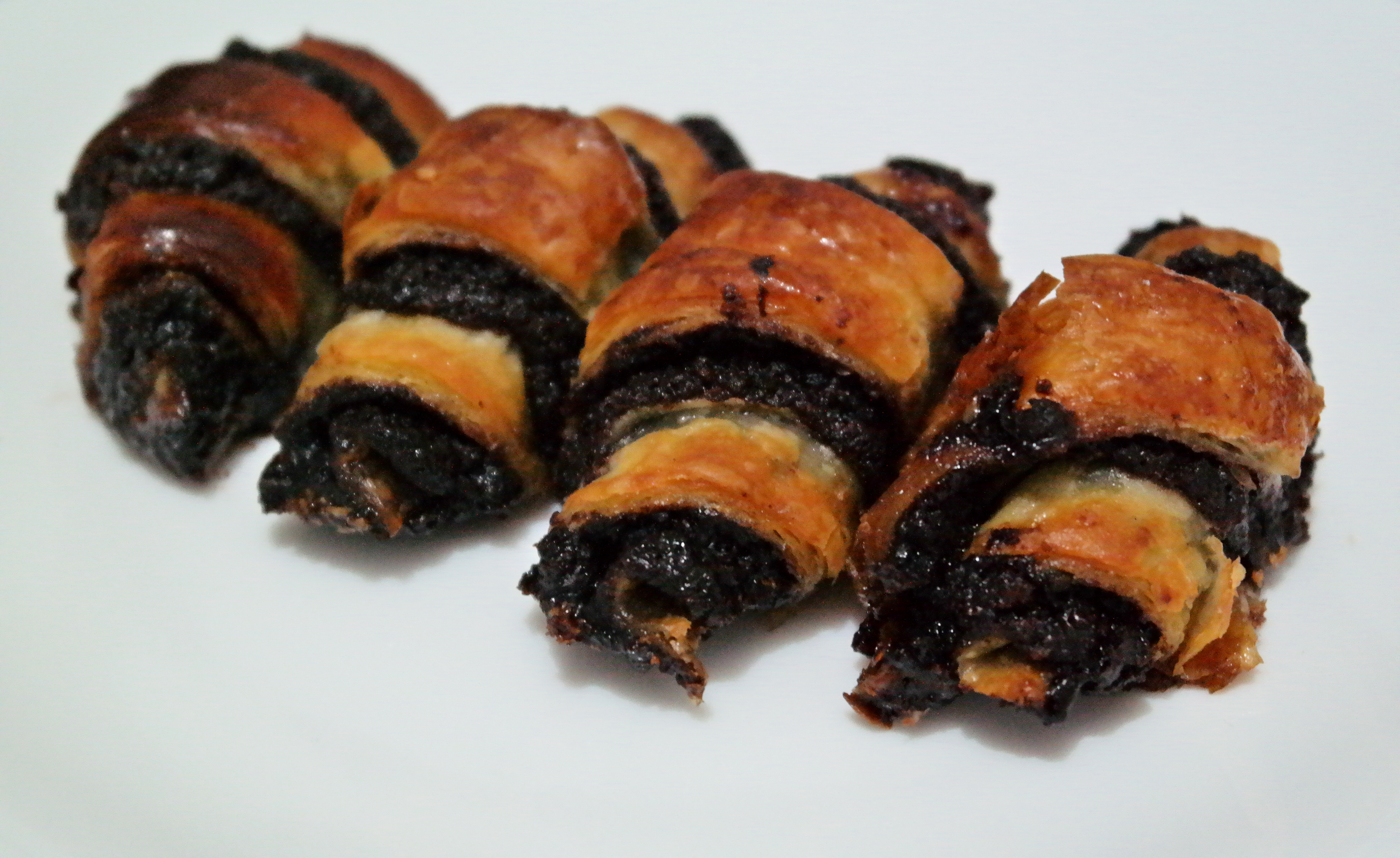
Chocolate rugelach

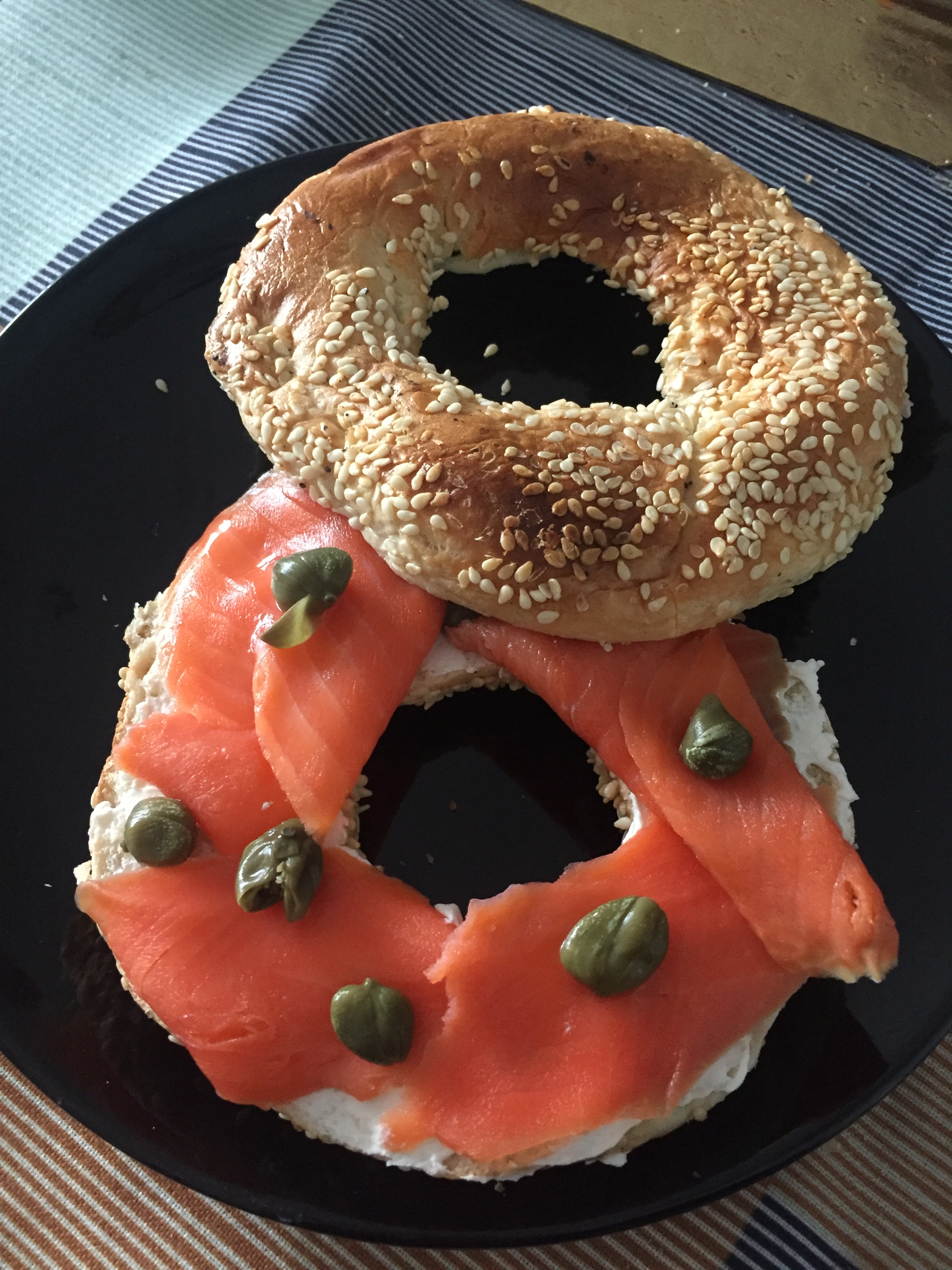
Bagel with lox, cream cheese, and capers

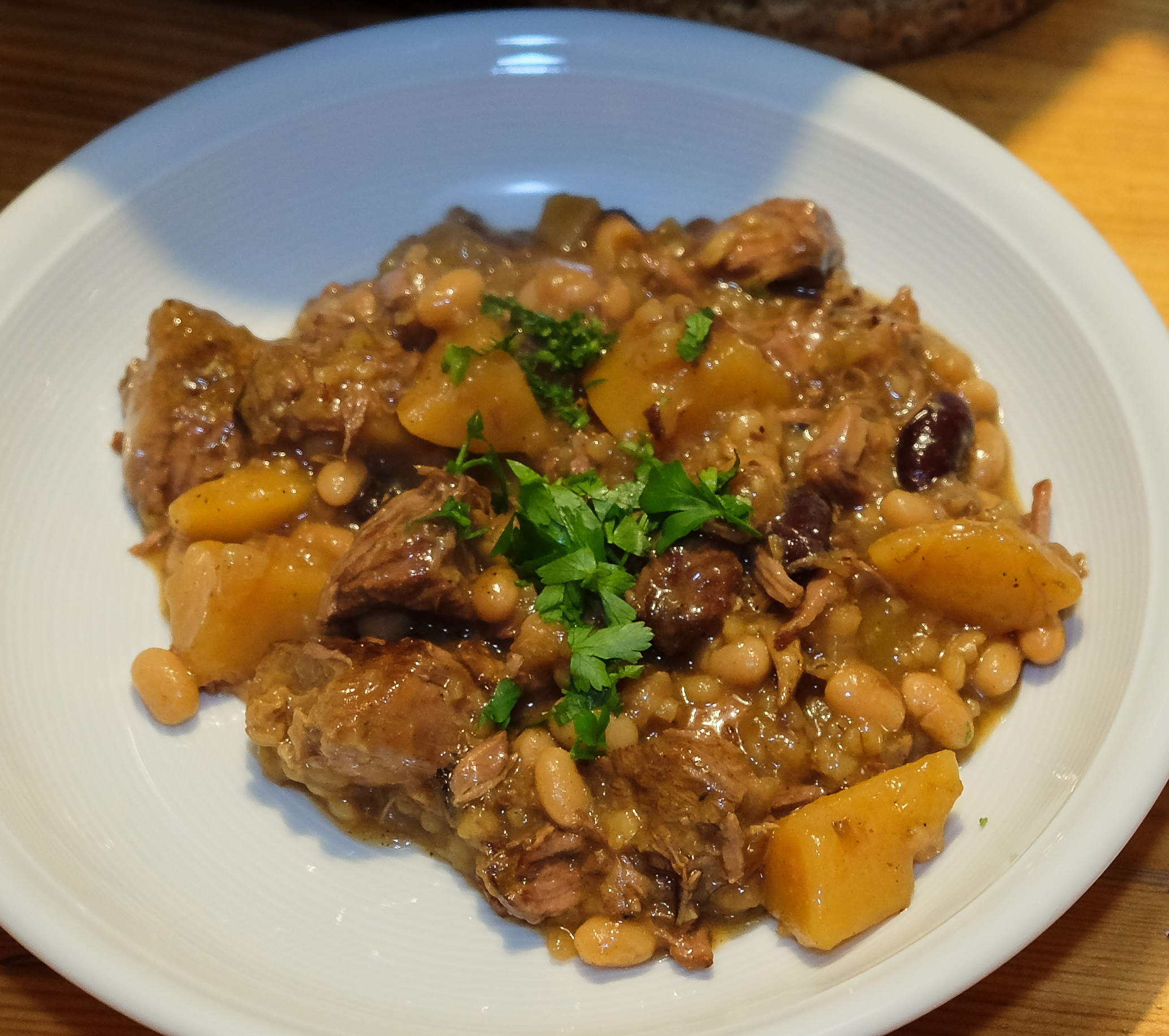
Cholent

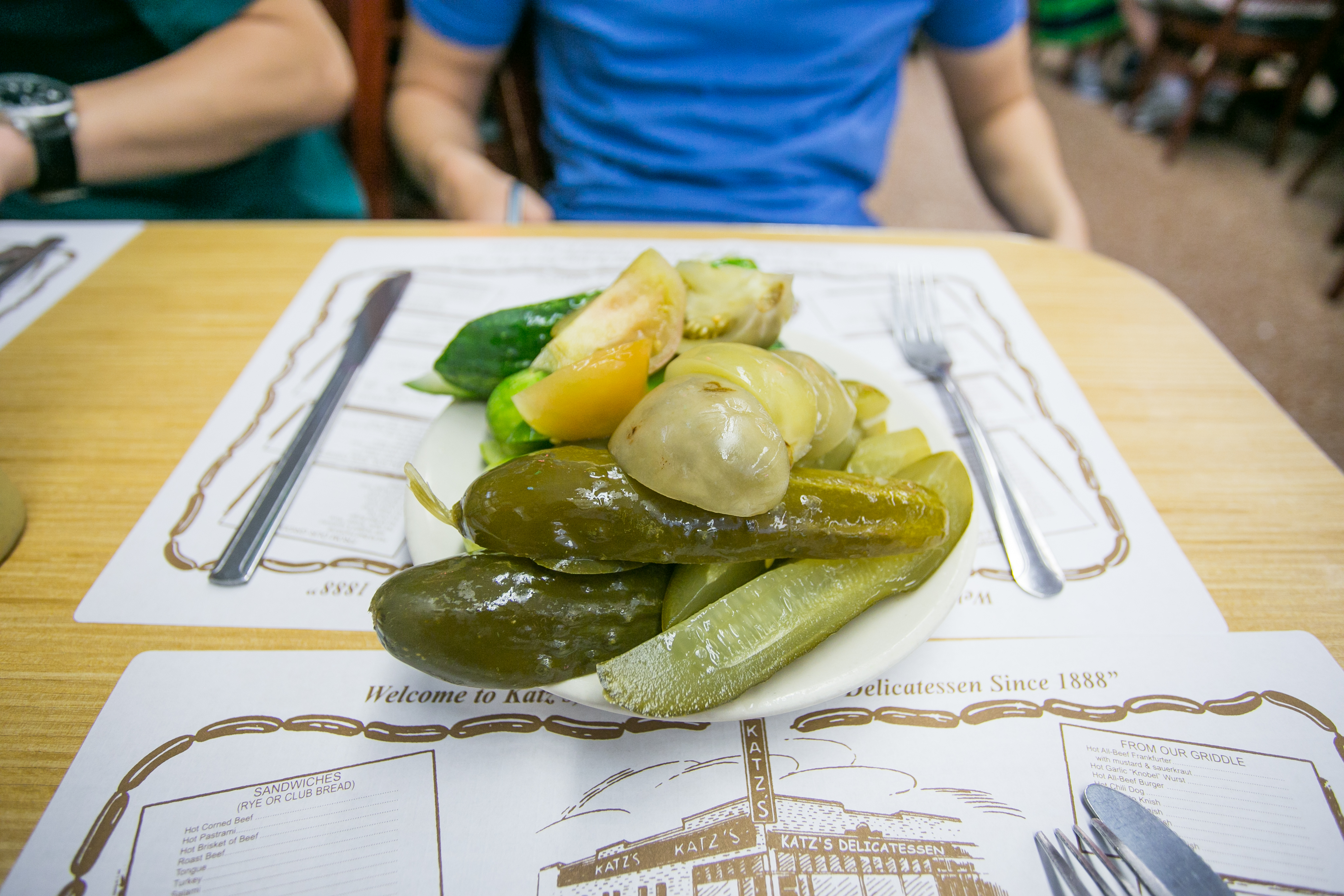
Half sour and full sour fermented cucumber pickles

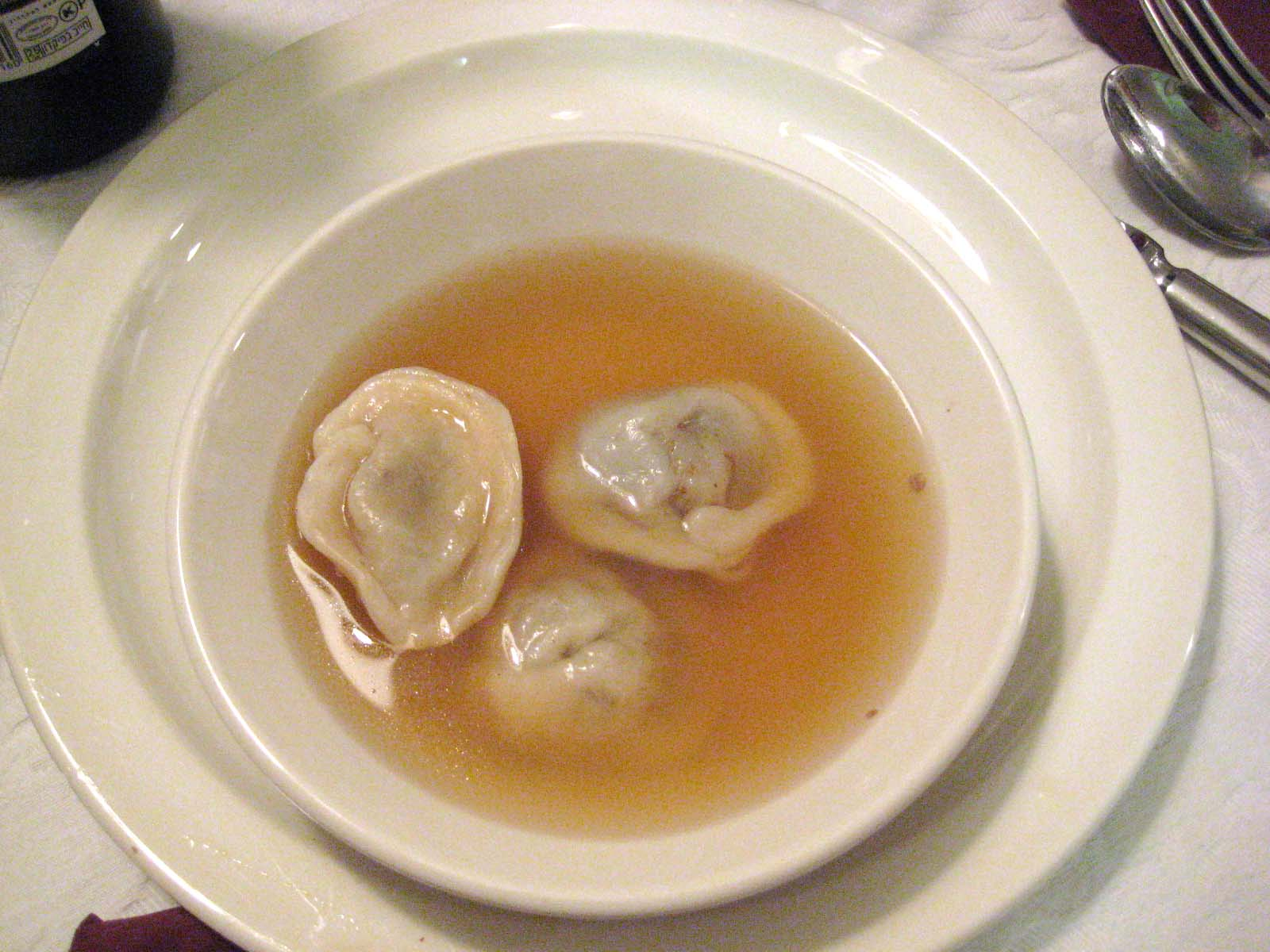
Chicken broth with kreplach (soup dumplings)

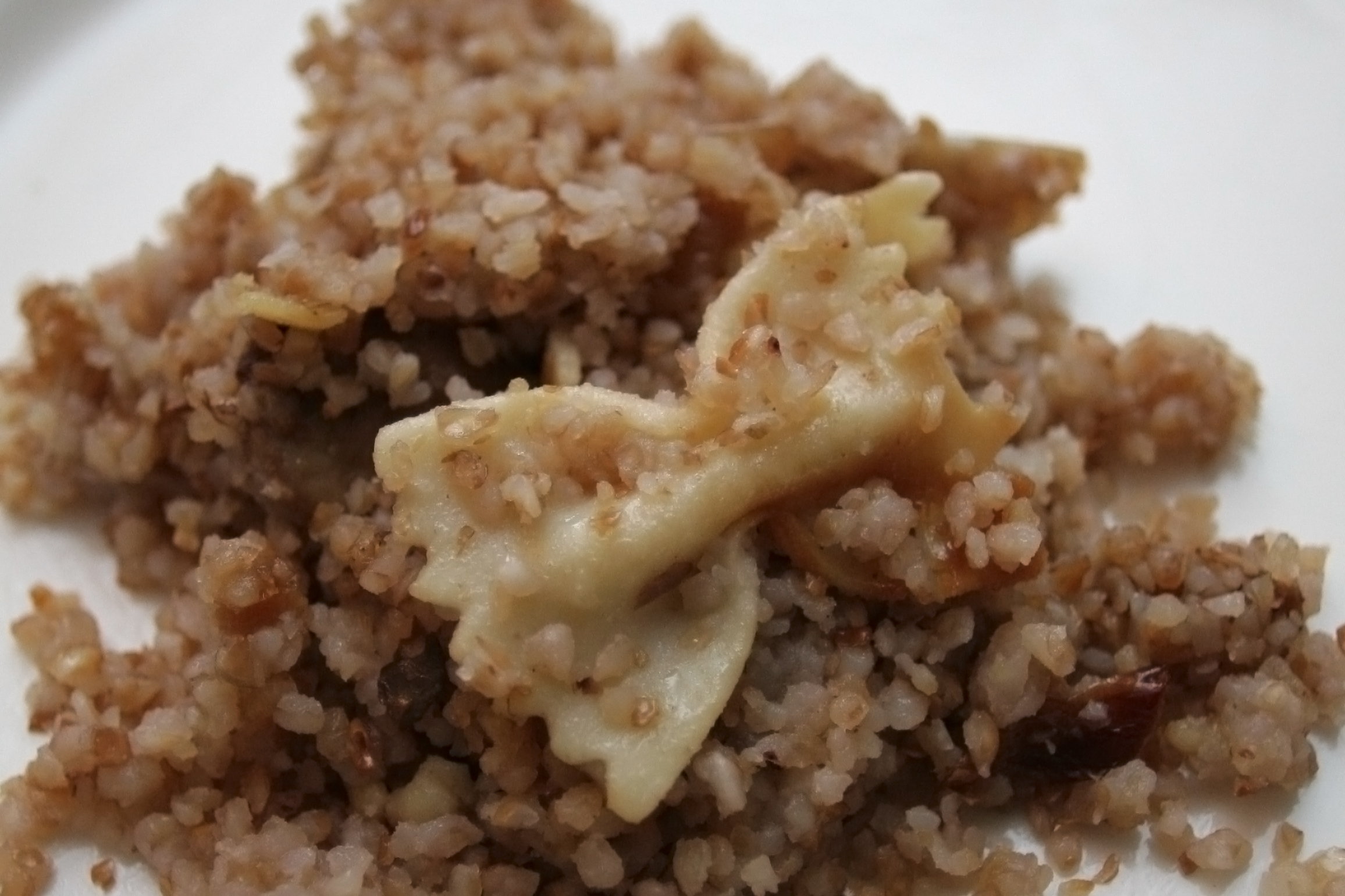
Kasha varnishkes

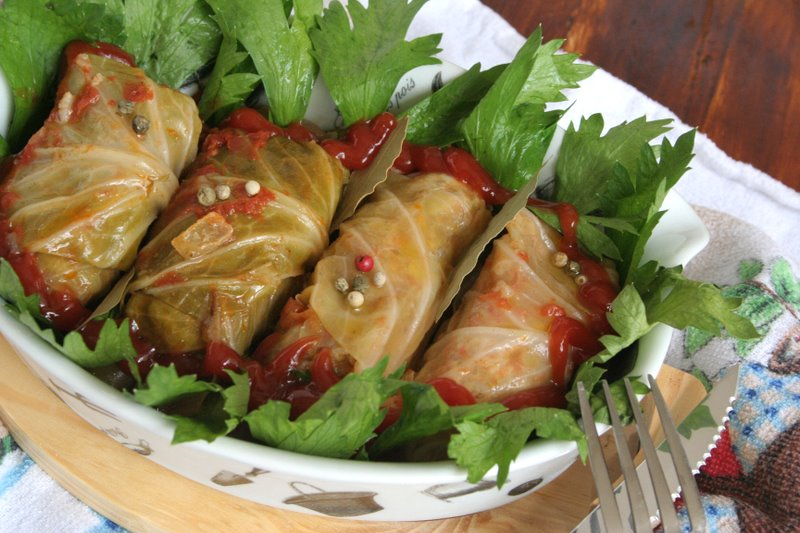
Holishkes (cabbage rolls)

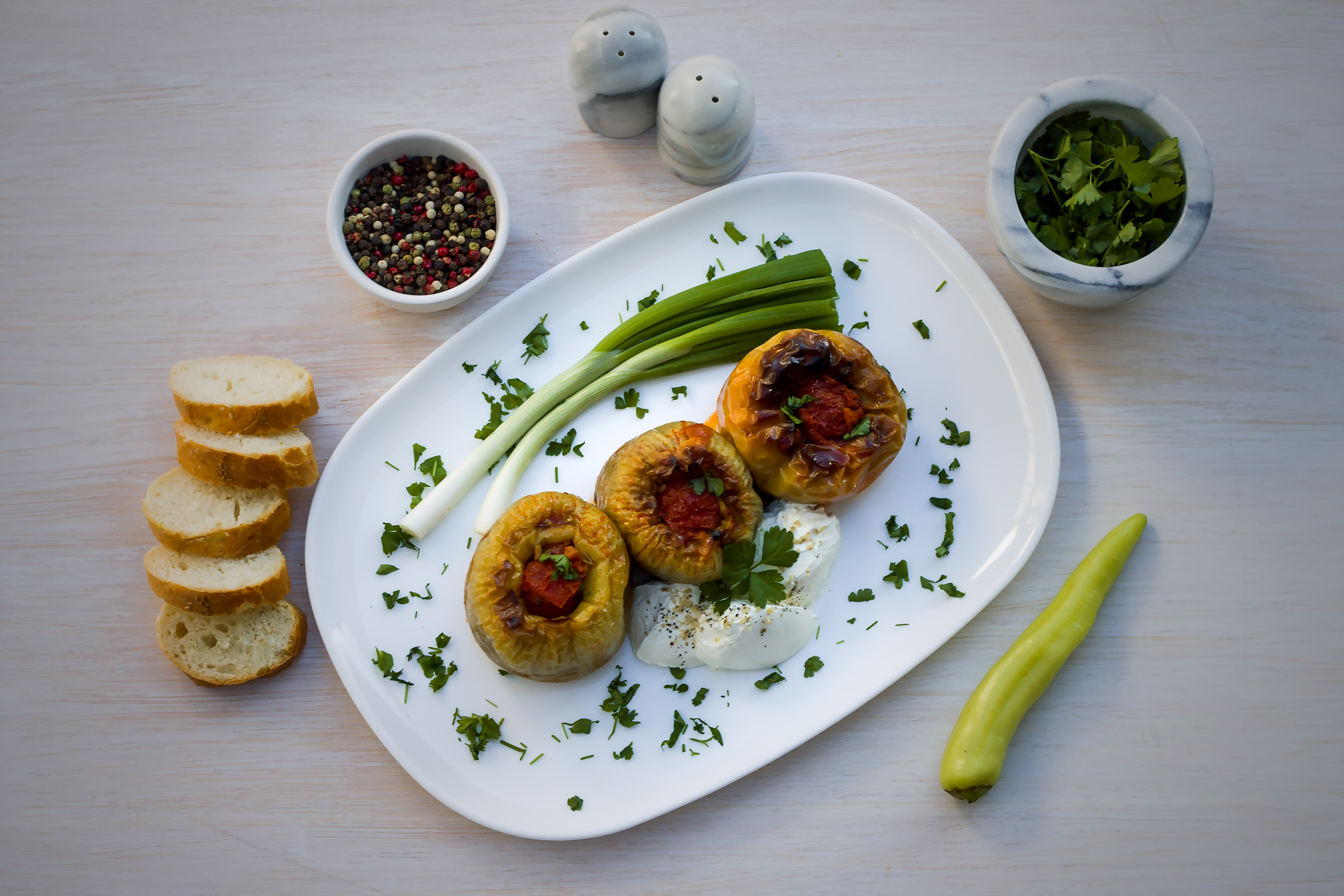
Gefilte feffers (stuffed peppers)

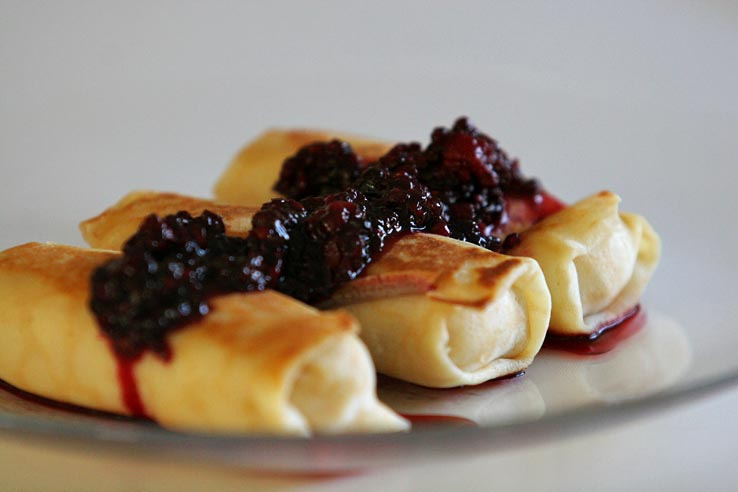
Cheese blintzes with blackberry preserves

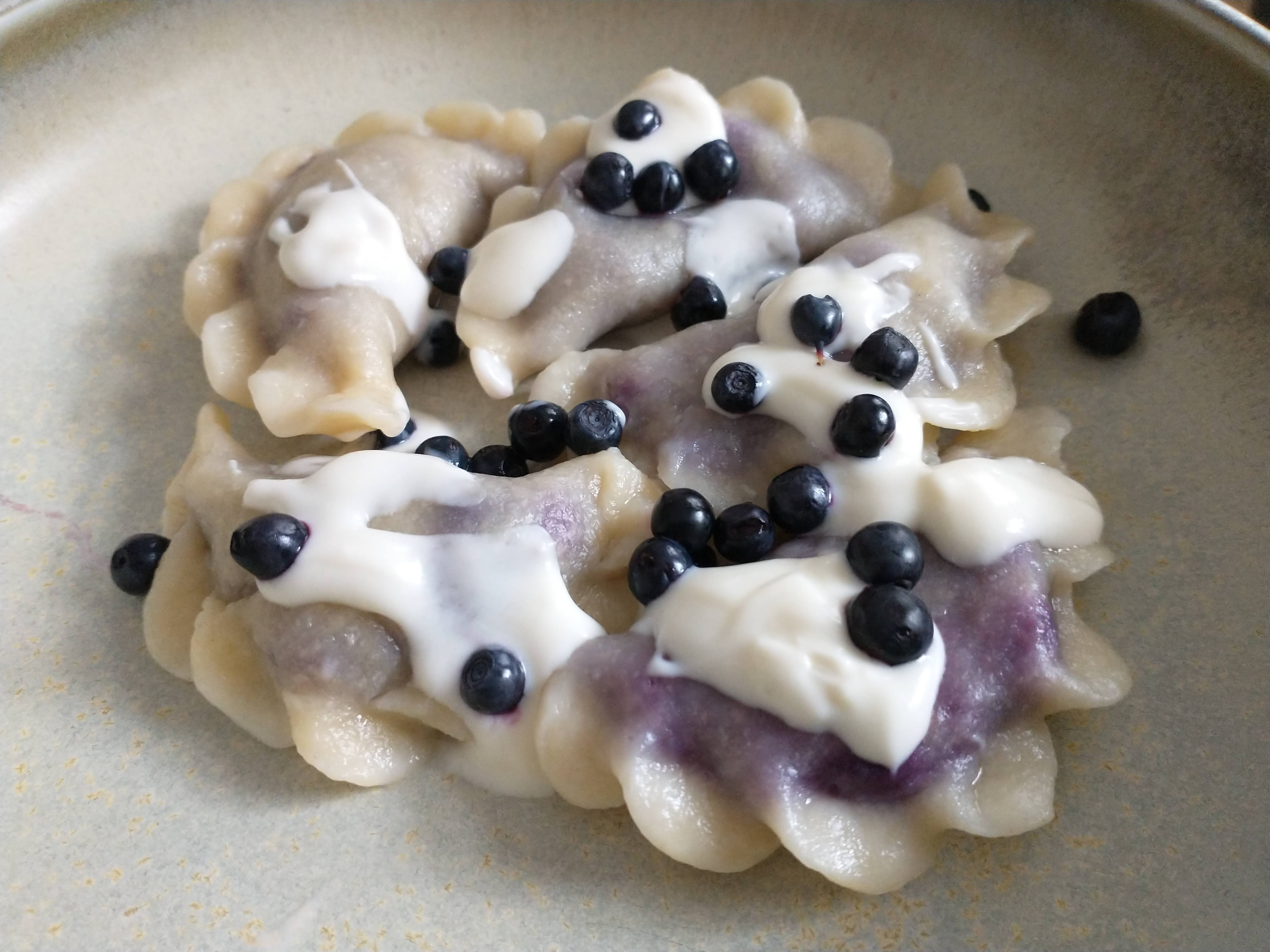
Varenikes (dumplings with fruit preserves)

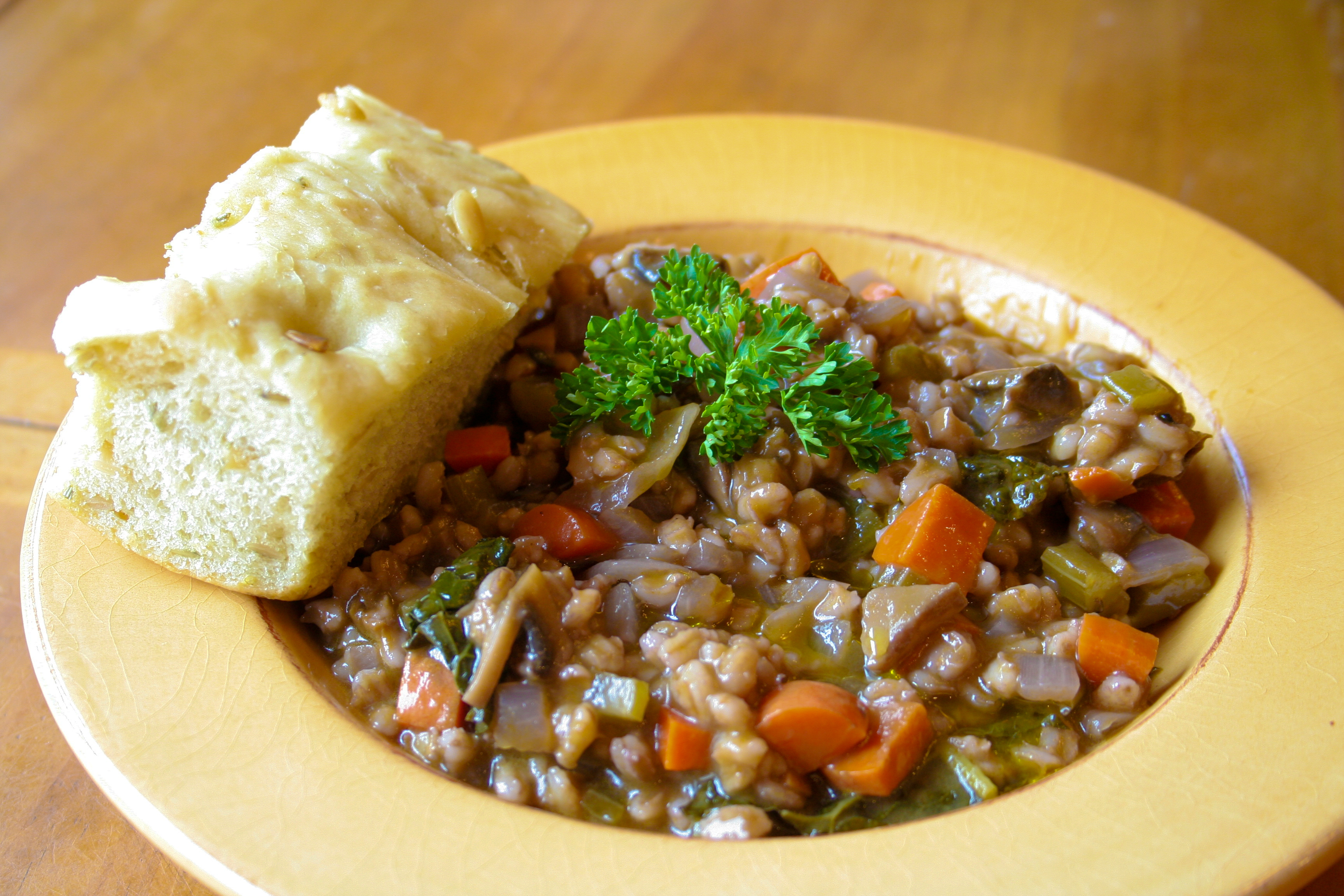
Krupnick (barley and mushroom) soup

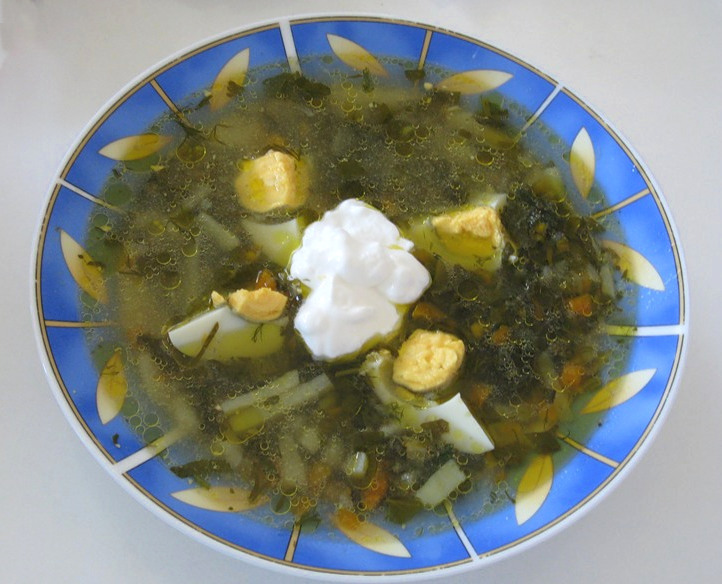
Shtshav (sorrel soup)

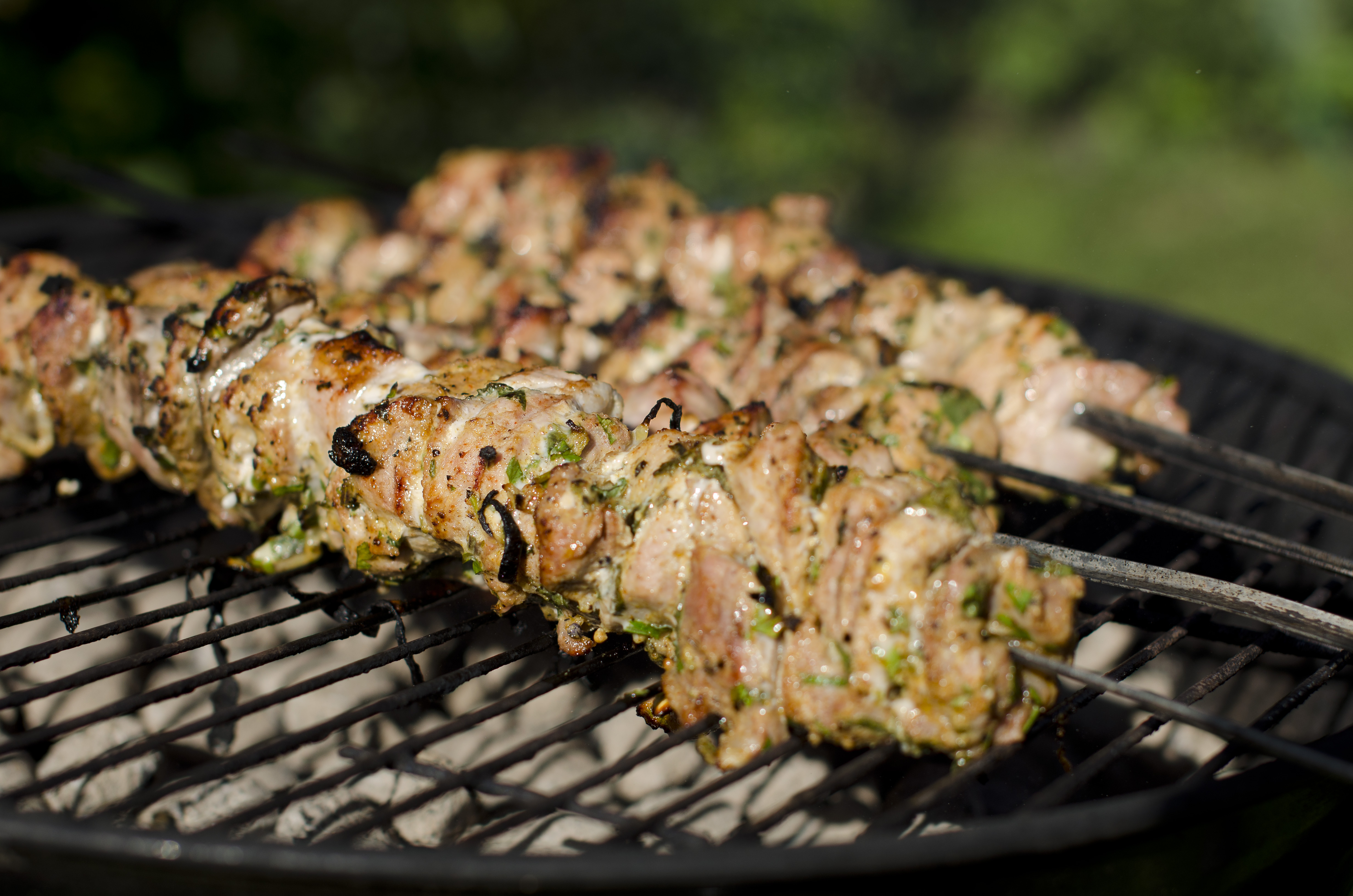
Shashlik cooked outdoors

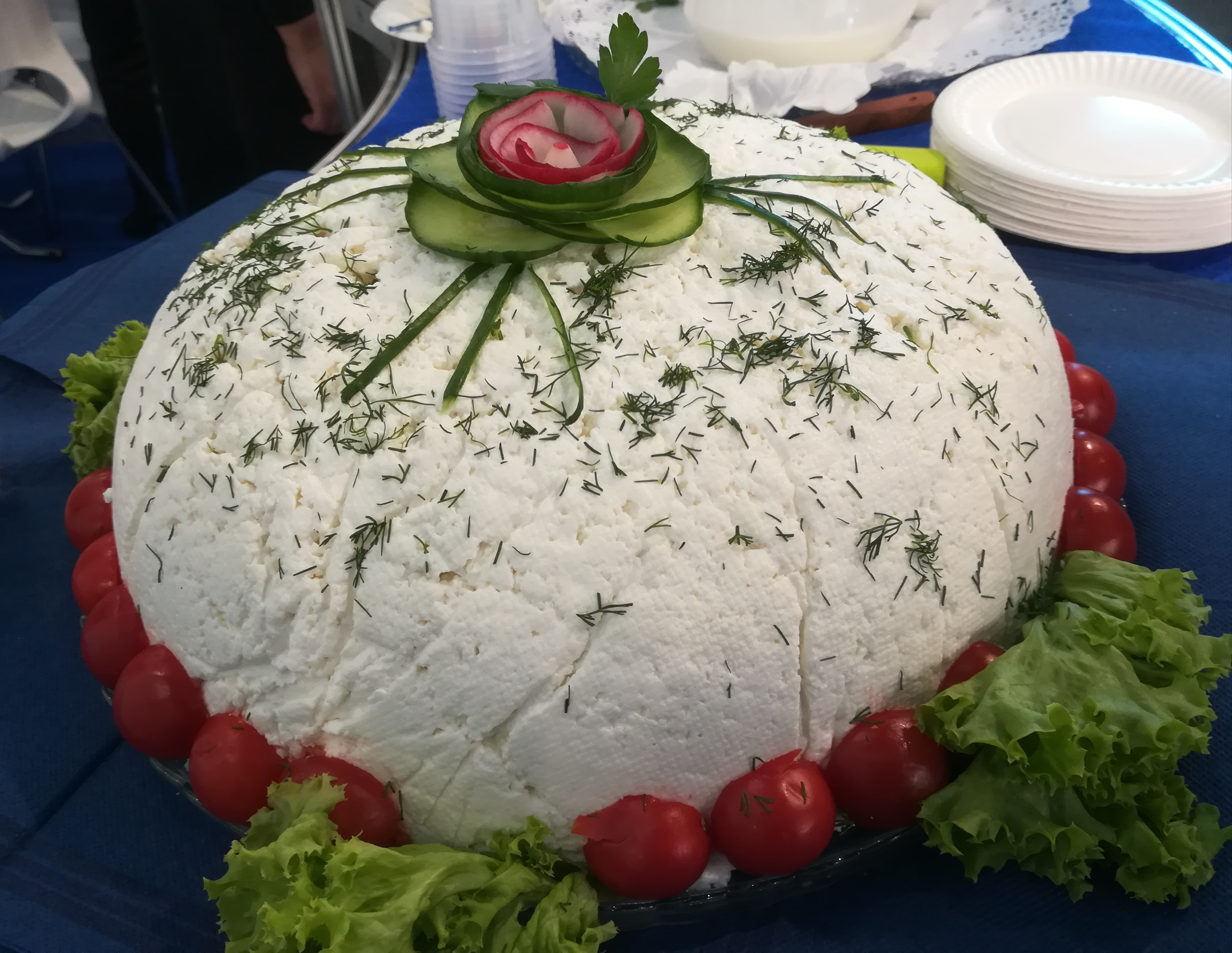
Fresh curd cheese

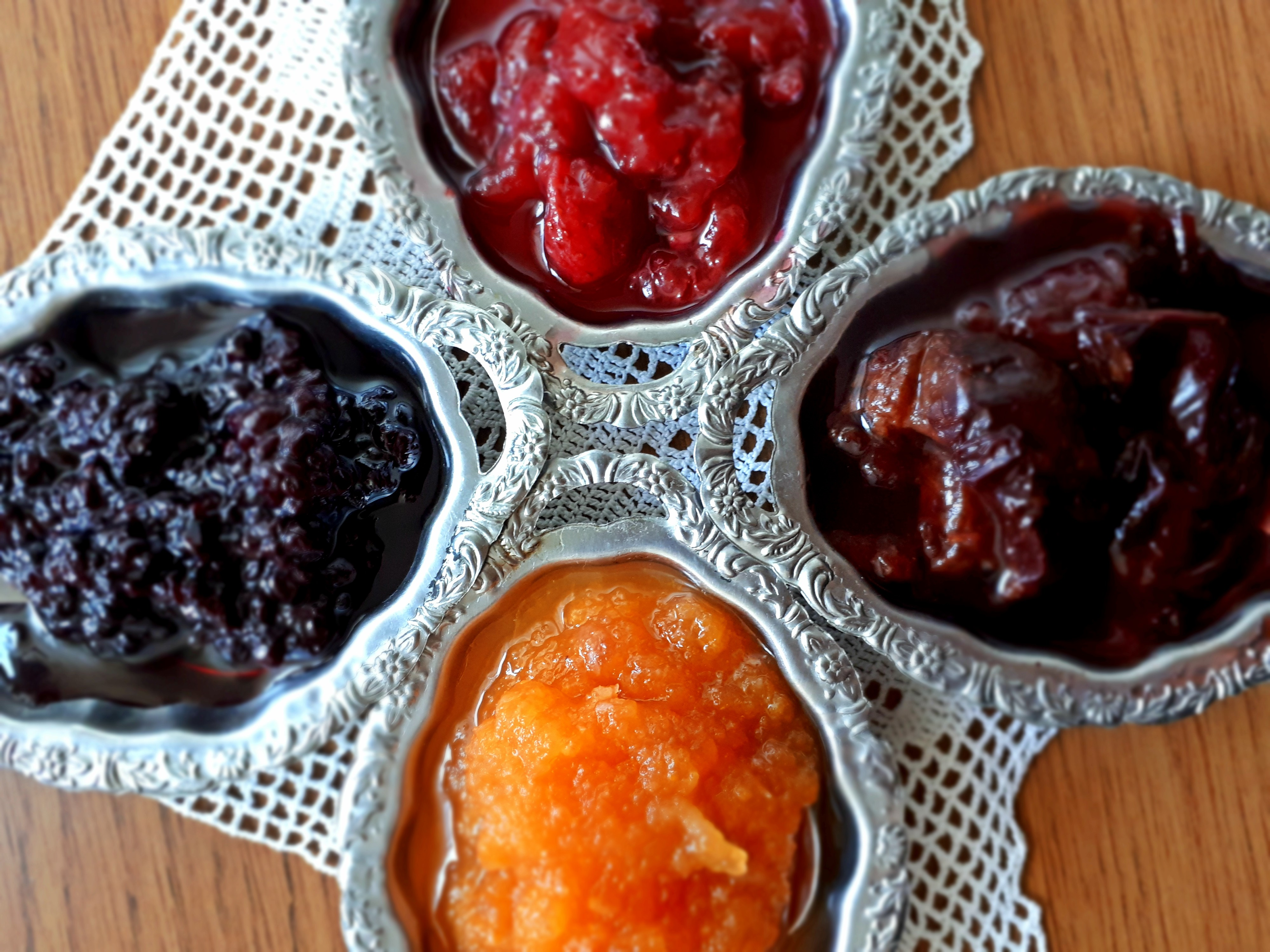
Fruit preserves

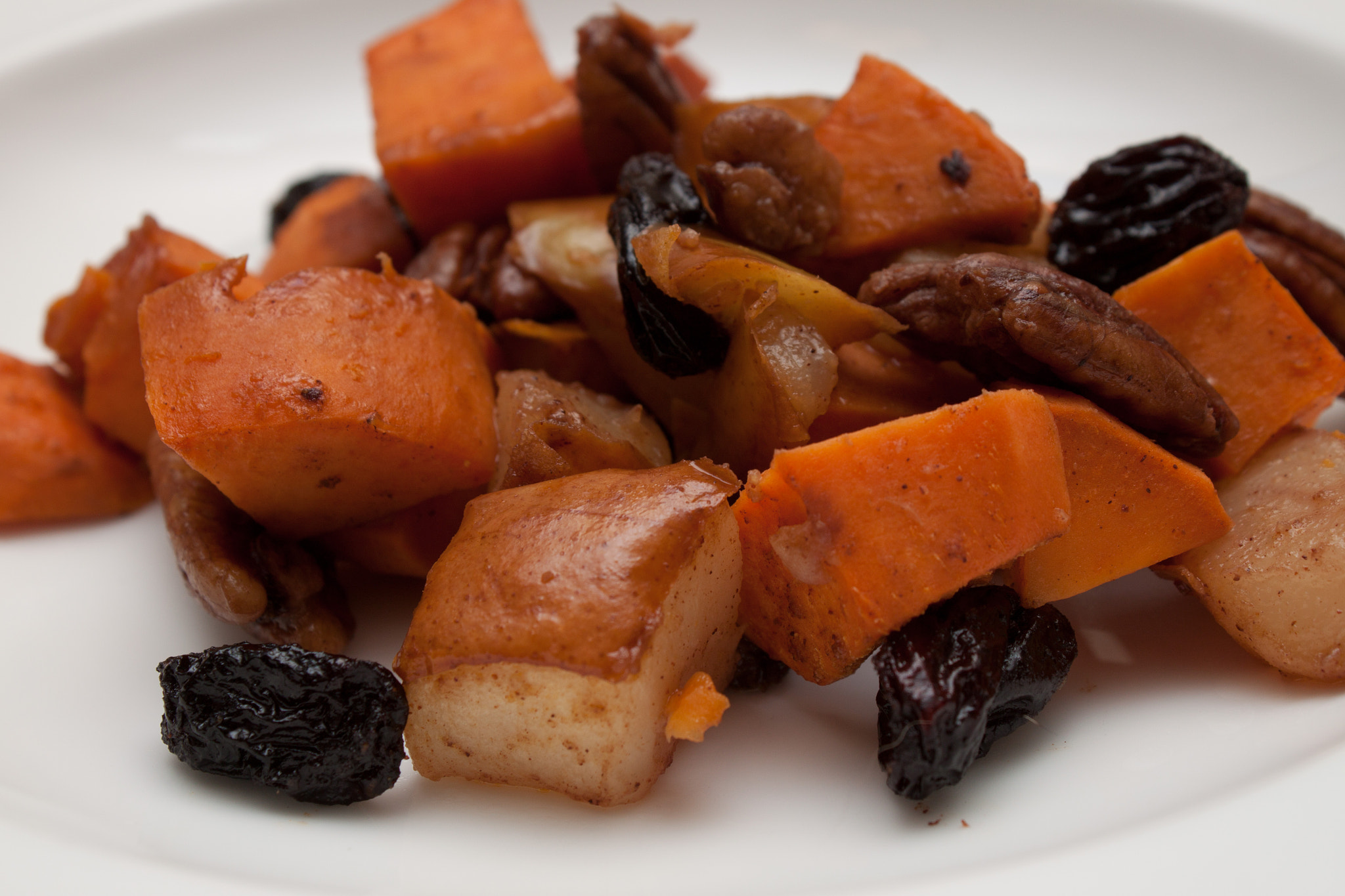
Tzimmes with sweet potato and pear

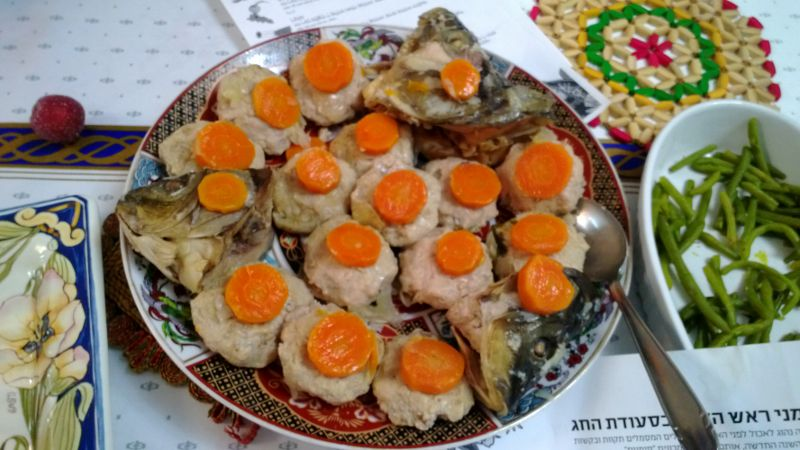
Gefilte fish quenelles

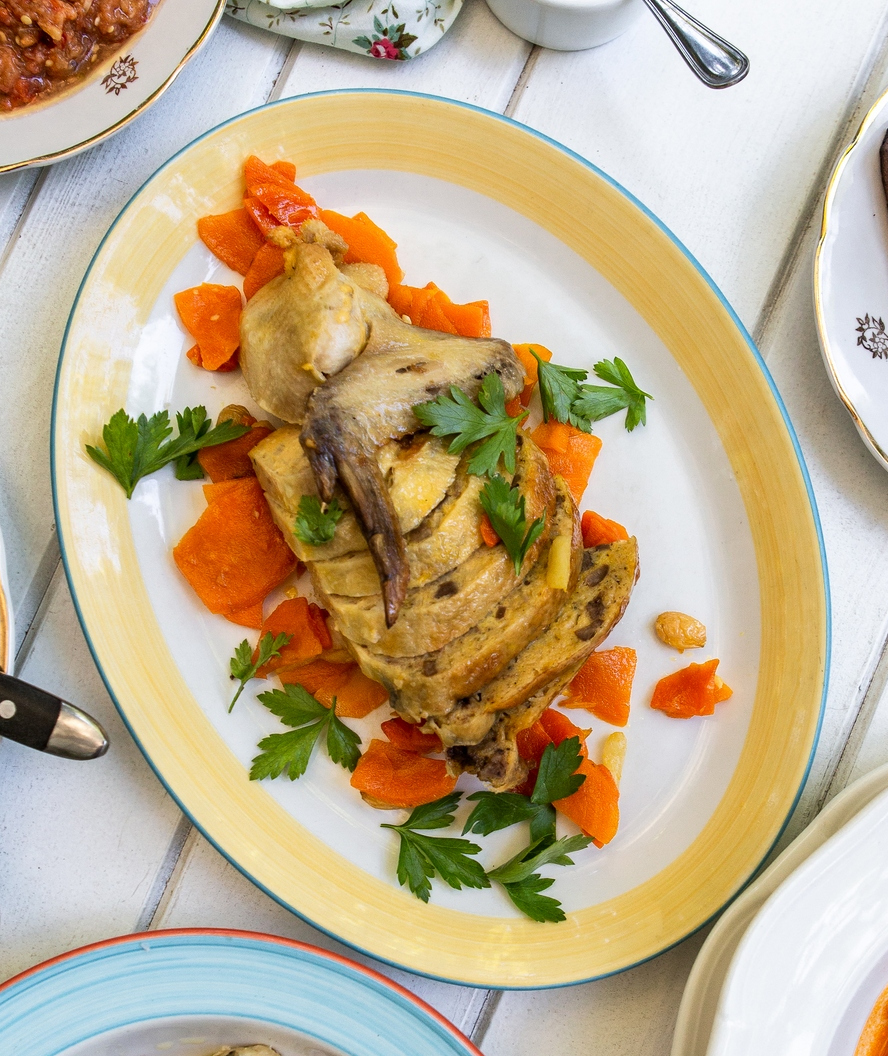
Helzel

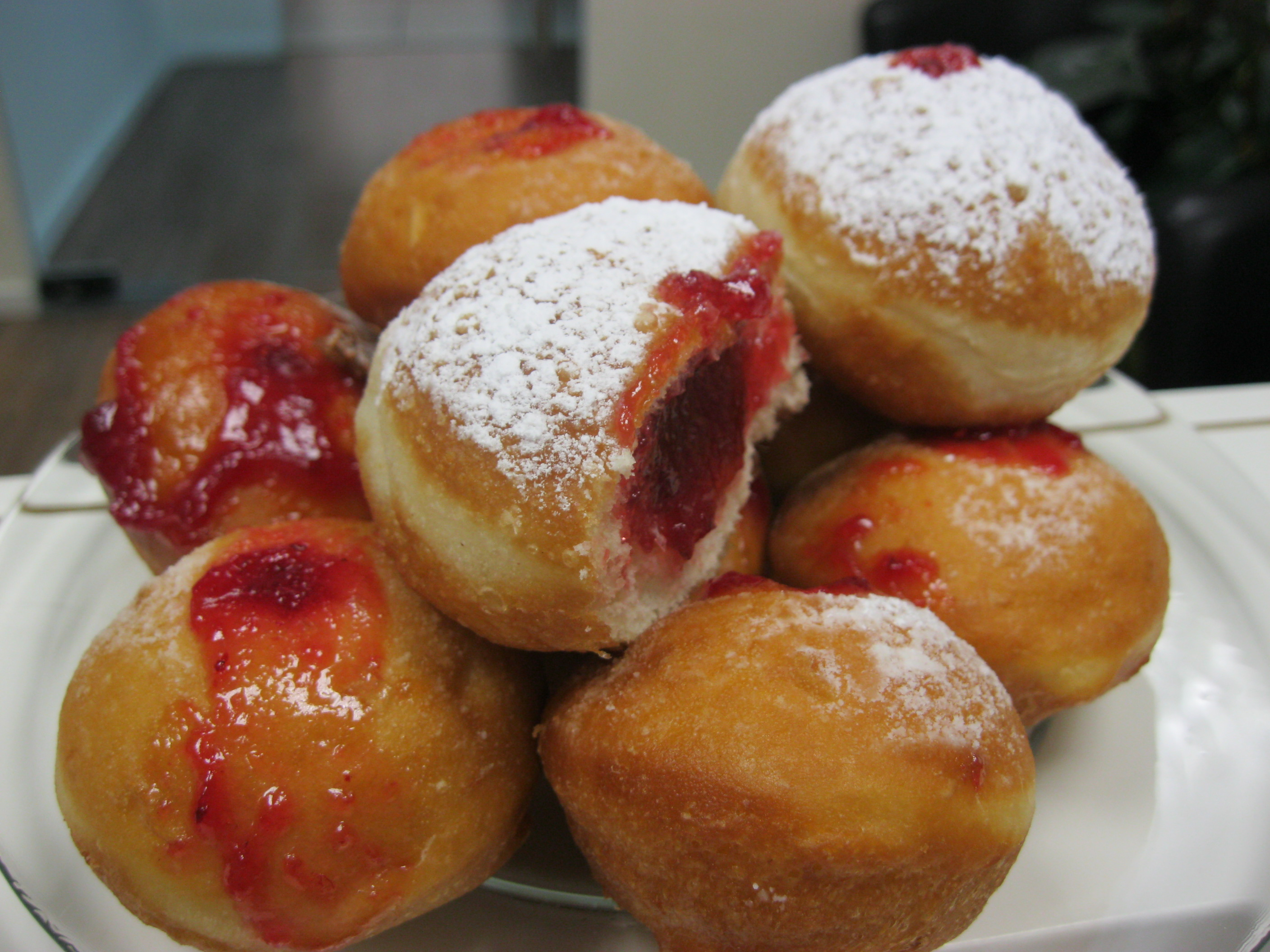
Pontshkes (jelly doughnuts)

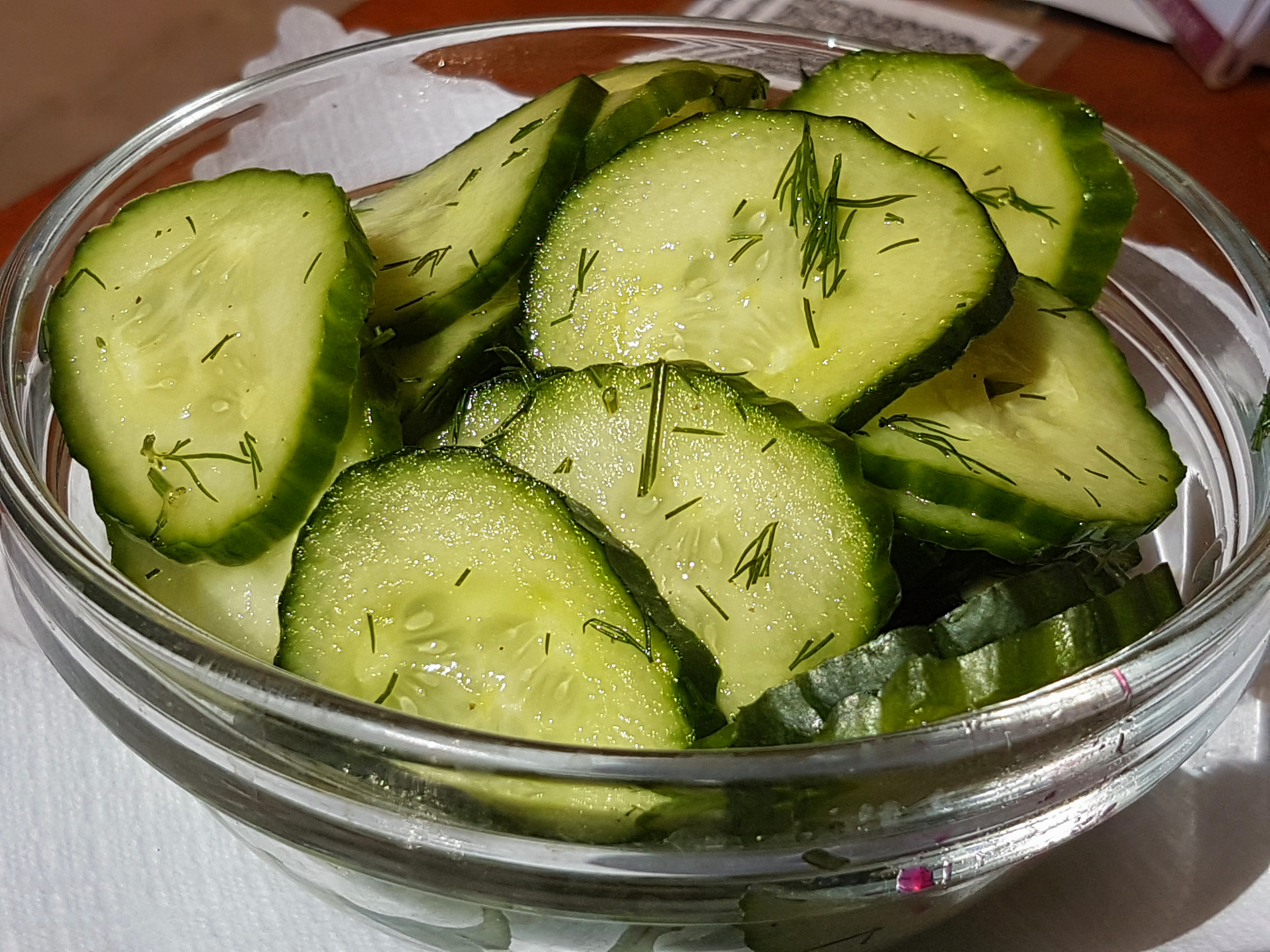
Cucumber salad with dill and onions

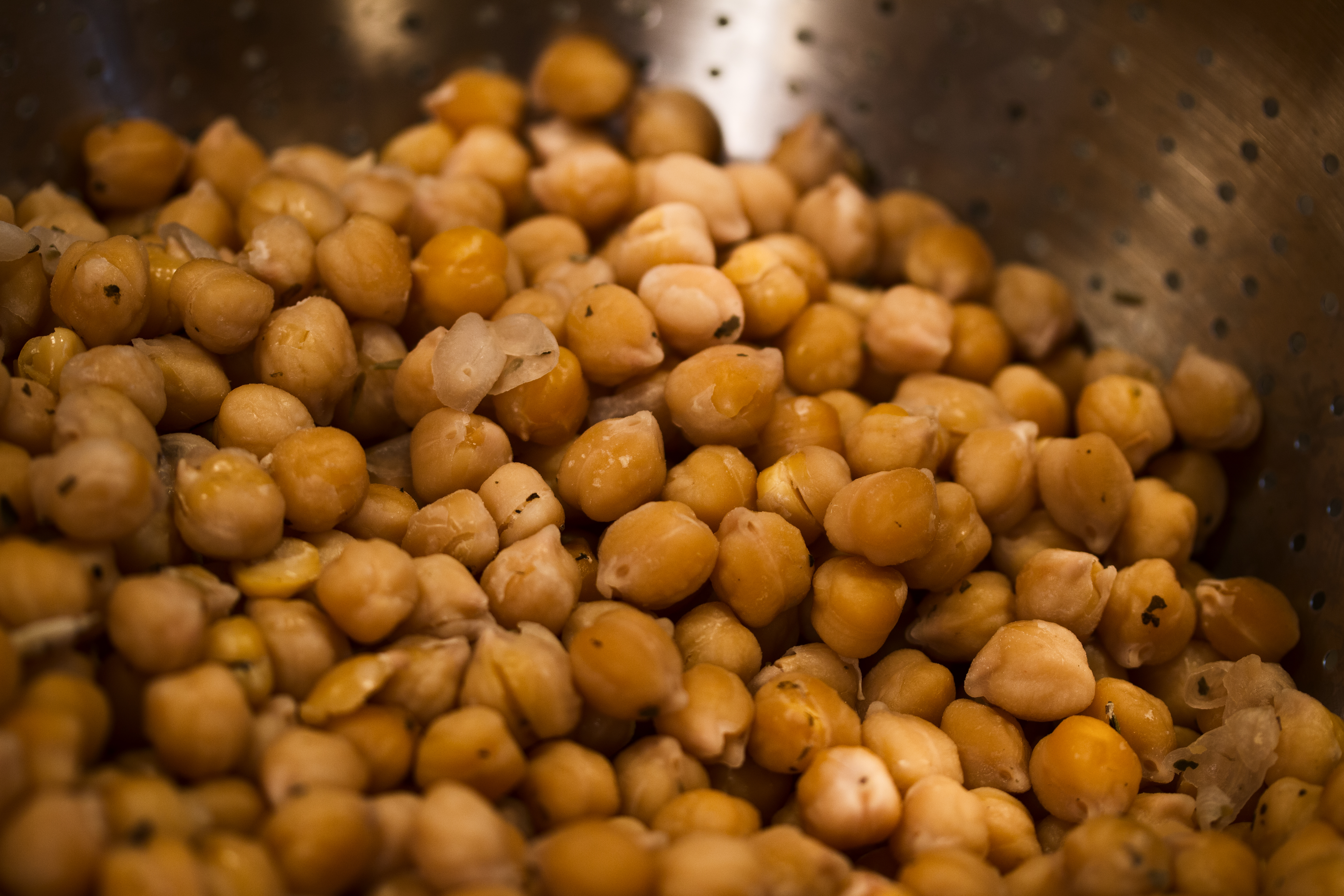
Arbes (boiled chickpeas)

== See also ==
- Ancient Israelite cuisine
- Ethiopian Jewish cuisine
- French cuisine
- German cuisine
- Israeli cuisine
- Jewish cuisine
- Mizrahi Jewish cuisine
- Sephardic Jewish cuisine
- Syrian Jewish cuisine
- Yemenite Jewish cuisine
- List of Ashkenazi Jewish restaurants
- Jewish deli
- Jewish dairy restaurant
