= Teiglach =

Small, knotted pastries boiled in a honeyed syrup

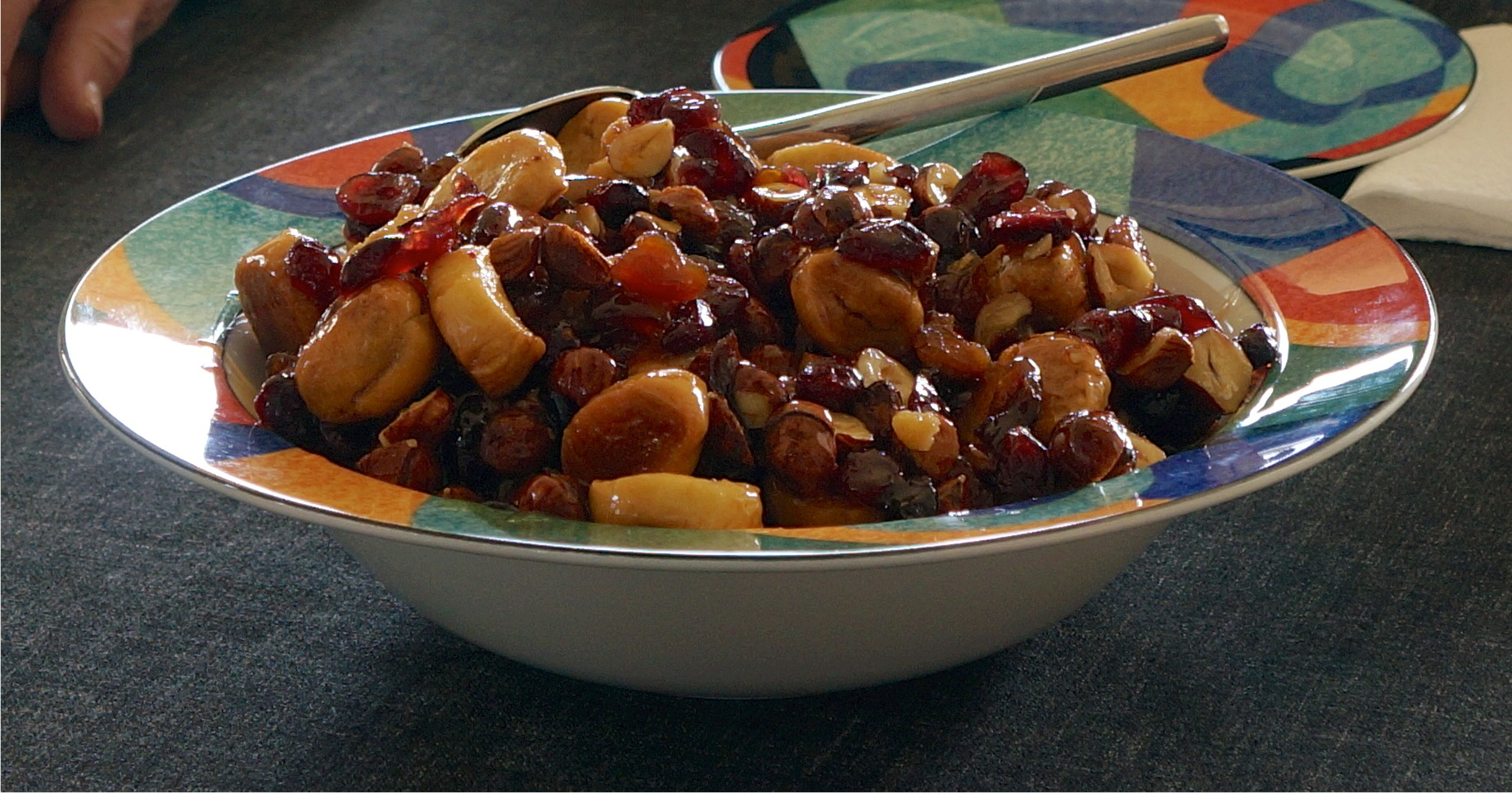
- Teiglach, a traditional Ashkenazi holiday dish
- Type: Cookie
- Main ingredients: Honey

Teiglach /ˈteɪɡləx/, also spelled taiglach or teglach (Yiddish: טייגלעך, singular teigel, literally "little dough") are small, knotted pastries boiled in a honeyed syrup. They are a traditional Ashkenazi Jewish treat for Rosh Hashanah, Sukkot, Simchat Torah, and Purim.

== History ==
Teiglach date back to the times of the Romans, who made strips of fried dough in honey called vermiculi. Italian Jews adopted the dish but it disappeared from their repertoire in the Middle Ages. In the 12th century, Franco-German rabbis mentioned eating a dish of fried or baked strips of dough covered in honey, called vermesel or verimlish, at the beginning of the Sabbath meal. The name went through changes, being called gremsel and then chremsel in Eastern Europe. Teiglach are popular on Rosh Hashanah, when it is traditional to eat foods made with honey to usher in a sweet new year.

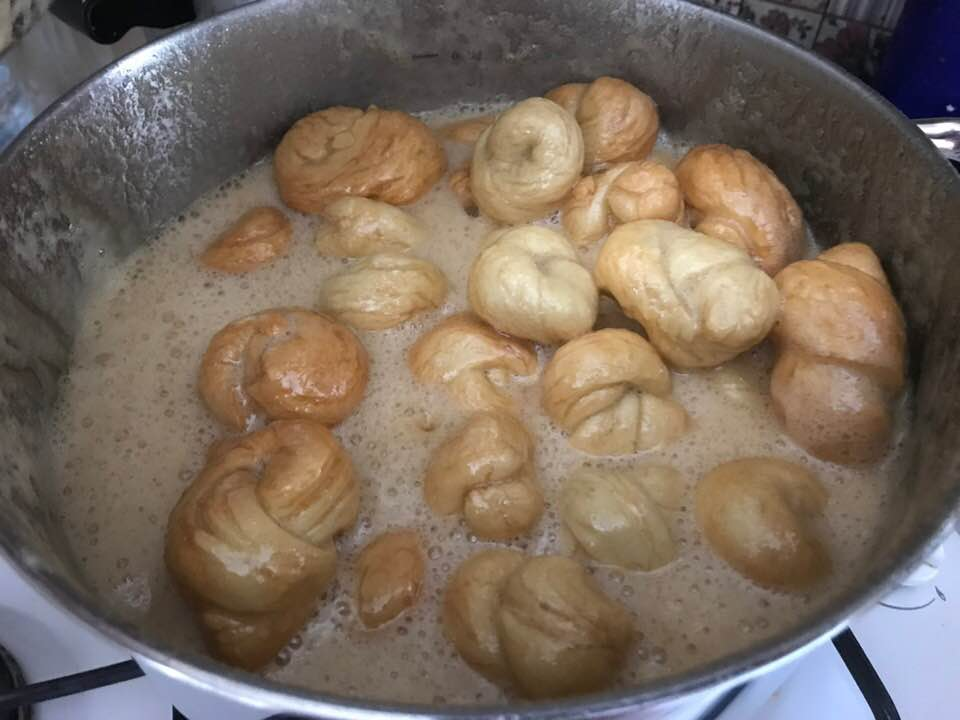
Boiling teiglach in honey

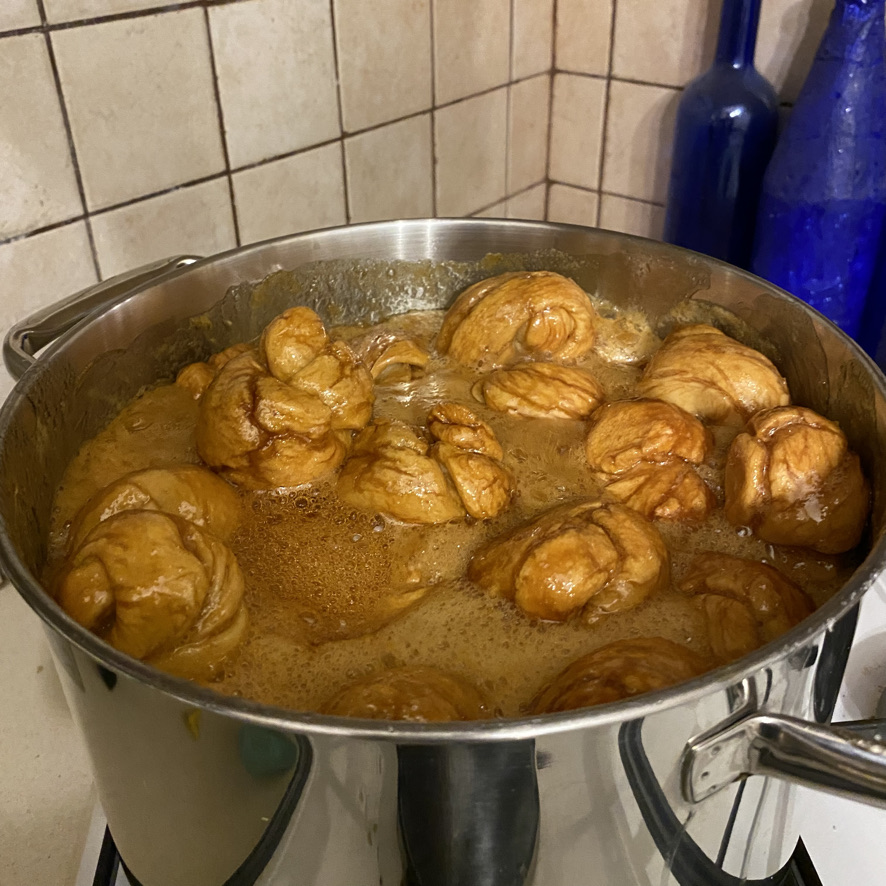
Cooked teiglach turning brown

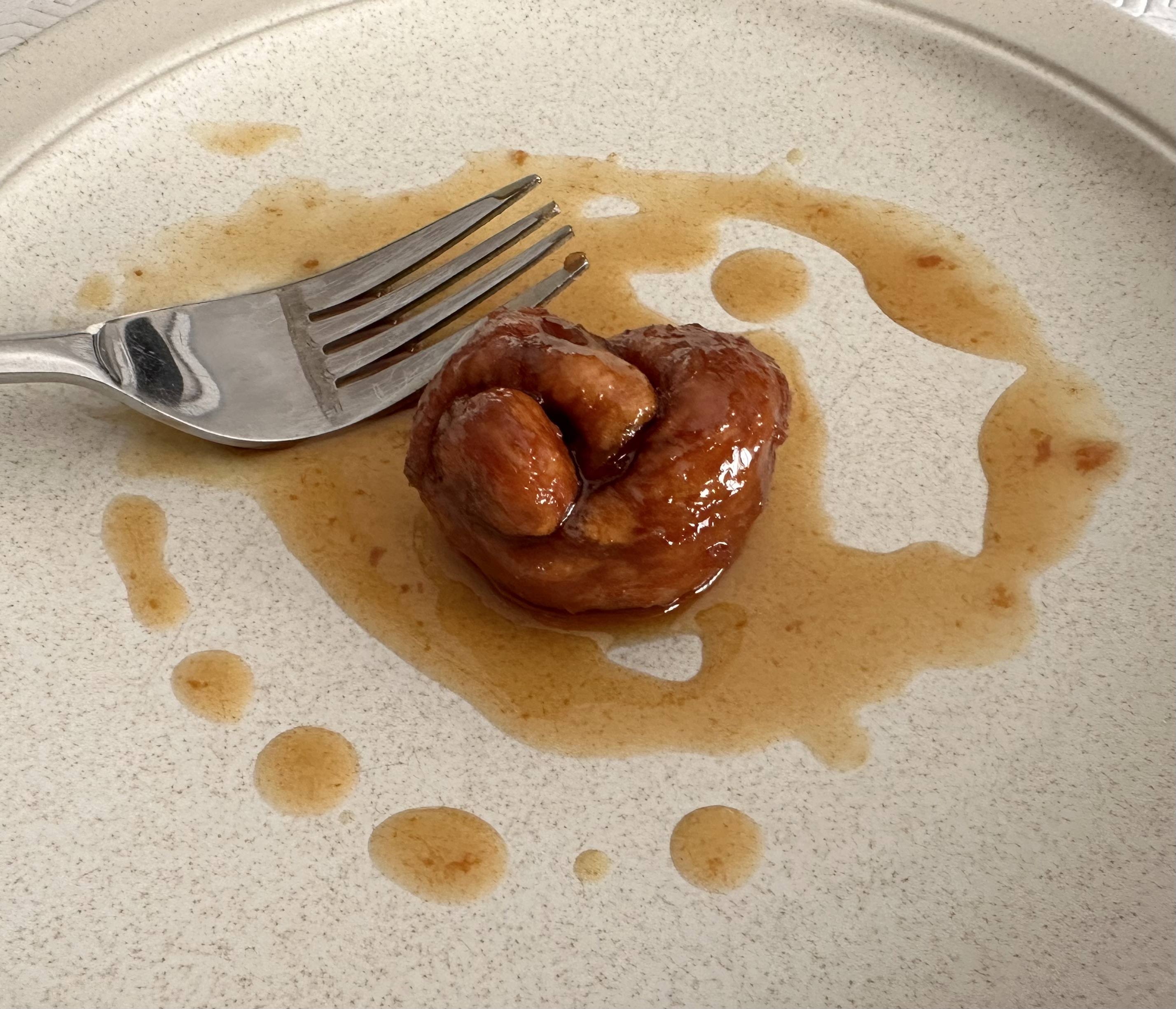
A single serving of teiglach
