= Flódni =

Hungarian Jewish layered pastry

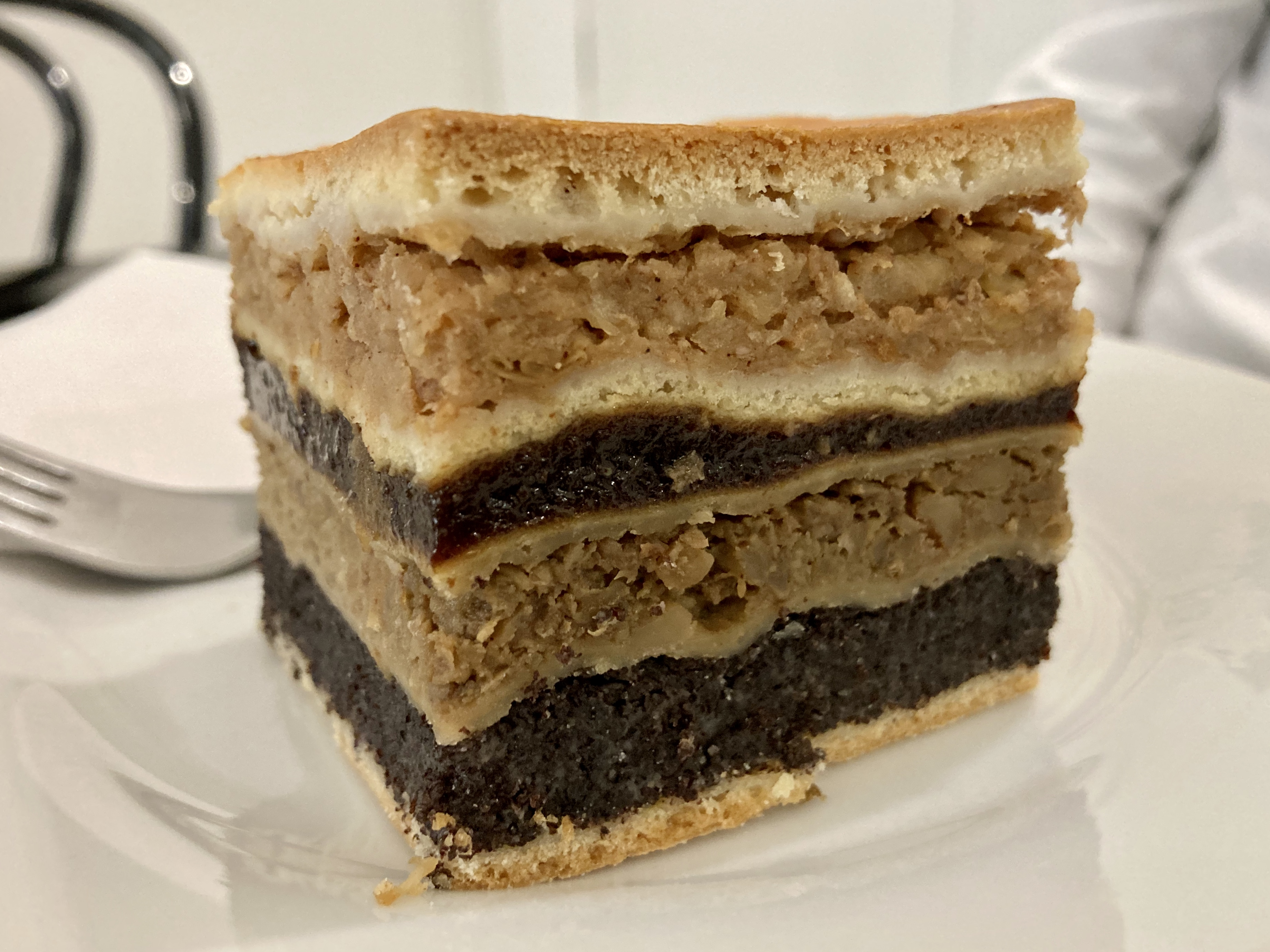
Flódni at a café in Vienna.

Flódni (Hungarian name; also known as פֿלאָדן (flodn) in Yiddish and Fächertorte in Austria) is a traditional Hungarian Jewish pastry, filled with layers of apple, walnuts, poppy seeds, and plum jam. It is traditionally eaten at Purim and Hanukkah.

== History ==
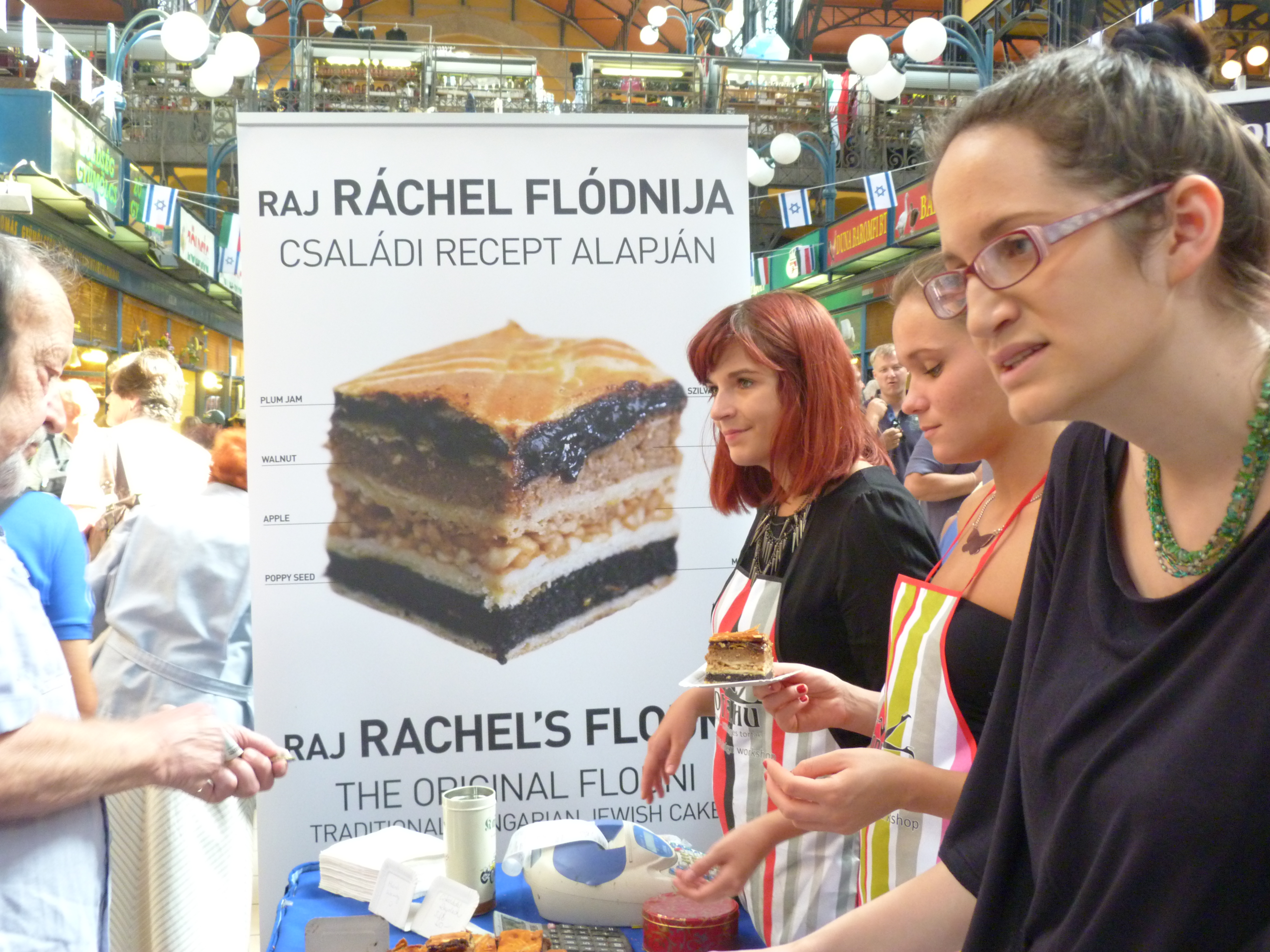
Ráchel Raj's flódni

Though associated with Hungary, it originated in Ashkenaz territories (western Germany and northern France) before Ashkenazi Jews migrated eastward. In 2012, Hungarian Jewish confectioner Ráchel Raj made 1600 pieces of flódni, which, if stacked, would reach 96 meters tall, the height of the Hungarian parliament building.
