= Ukha =

Russian soup made of fish

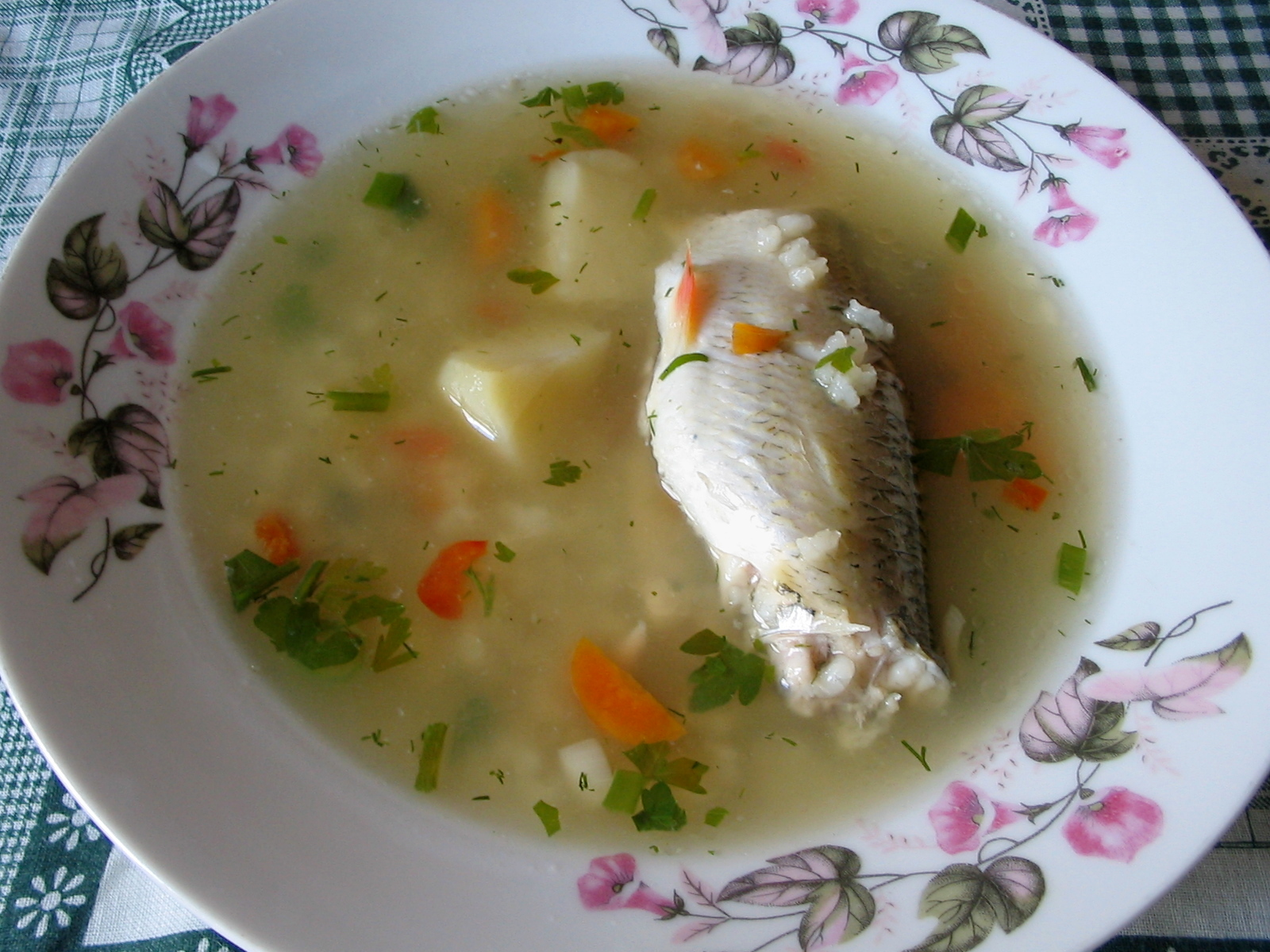
- Type: Soup
- Place of origin: Russia
- Main ingredients: Fish (sturgeon, salmon, cod), root vegetables, leeks, potatoes

Ukha (Russian: уха́ [ʊˈxa]) is a clear Russian soup, made from various types of fish such as bream, wels catfish, northern pike, or even ruffe. It usually contains root vegetables, parsley root, leek, potato, bay leaf, dill, tarragon, and green parsley, and is spiced with black pepper, saffron, nutmeg, and fennel seed. Fish such as perch, tench, sheatfish, and burbot are sometimes used to add flavour to the soup. The roots of the soup originated in the culture of the Russian Cossack steppe riders and the soup is mostly associated in Russia with the Don region.

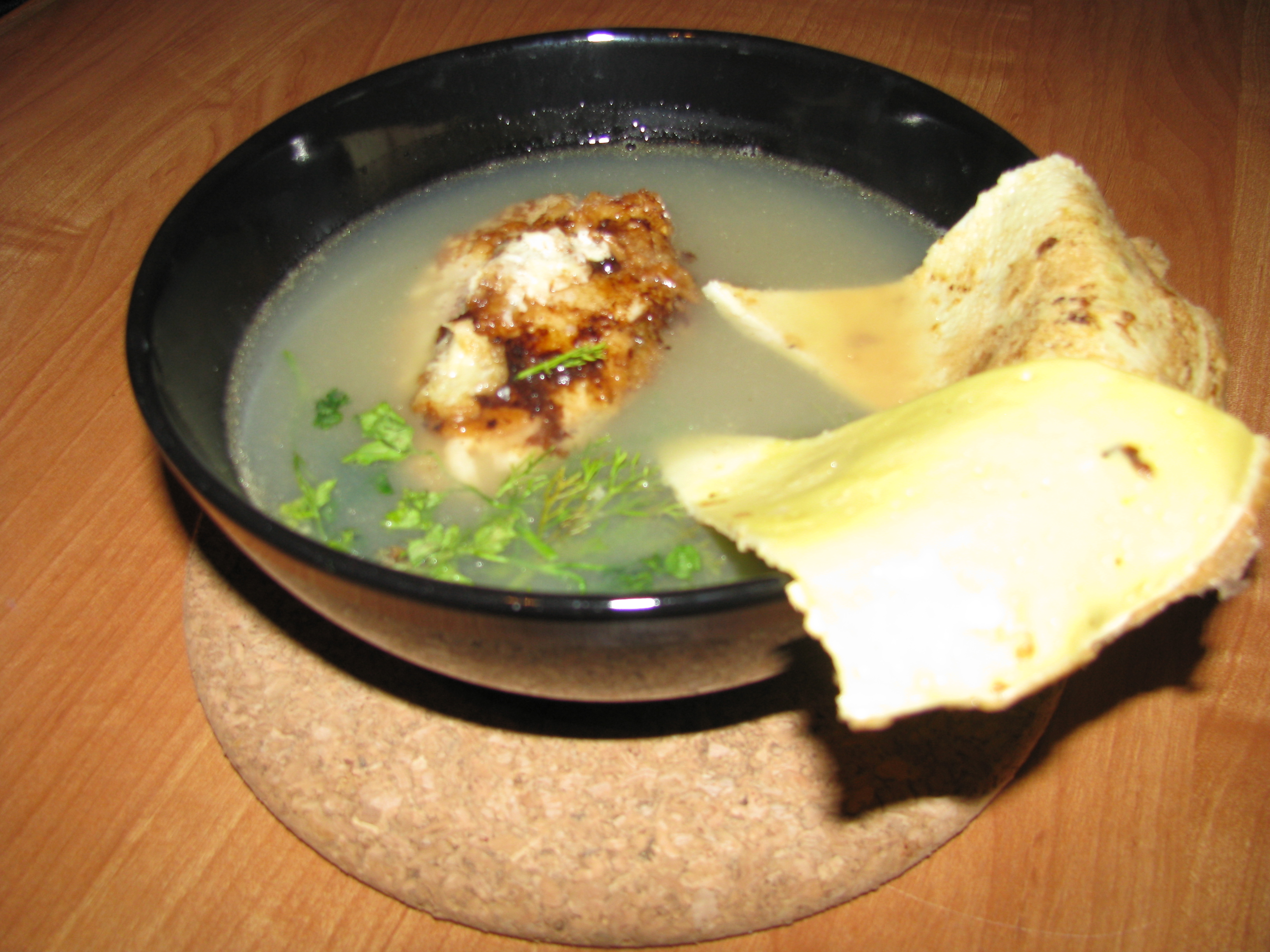
A bowl of a less common variant of ukha (Russian: опеканная уха) made from sauteed pike perch

While ukha is a fish dish that is made with broth, calling it a fish soup may not be absolutely correct. "Ukha" started to be used as a term for fish broth in Russian cuisine in the late 17th to early 18th centuries. In earlier times, this term referred to thick meat broths, and then later chicken. Beginning in the 15th century, fish was more and more often used to prepare ukha, thus creating a dish that had a distinctive taste among soups. In the 19th century, many travellers visiting Russia claimed ukha to be one of the best dishes in Russian cuisine.

Vegetables were kept to a minimum when preparing ukha, and in fact, in classic Belarusian cuisine, ukha was simply a rich fish broth that accompanied fish pies (pirozhki, rasstegai, coulibiac, and other pirogi). Today it is more often a fish soup, cooked with potatoes and other vegetables. A wide variety of freshwater fish can be used, and some aficionados opine that one cannot make a good ukha from saltwater fish species. Fresh fish lends the dish the best flavor, and so if frozen fish is used, it is better not to defrost it. Preference is given to smaller, younger fish, with the tail parts of bigger fish discarded.

Commonly fishermen add a shot of vodka to ukha at the end to create a specific flavour. Another custom is to dip the smoldering firebrand from the fire directly into ukha at the very end.

== See also ==
- Bouillabaisse, French fish soup
- Halászlé, Hungarian fisherman's soup
- Waterzooi, Belgian fish soup
- List of Russian dishes
- List of soups
- List of fish dishes
