= Fleischkuekle =

North Dakotan deep-fried turnover

- Alternative names: Fleischkuechle
- Type: Turnover
- Course: Main course
- Place of origin: Black Sea/Crimea
- Region or state: North Dakota
- Associated cuisine: German-Russian North Dakotan
- Created by: Black Sea and Crimea Germans
- Main ingredients: Ground beef
- Similar dishes: Cheburek

Fleischkuekle (locally [ˌflɛɪ̯ʃˈki:xlʌ]; also fleischkuechle) is a deep-fried turnover popular among North Dakotans of German-Russian descent. The dish, which typically has ground beef and onions as a filling, is a traditional Black Sea Germans/Crimea Germans recipe, and through immigration became an addition to the cuisine of North Dakota. It is similar to the Crimean Tatar turnover cheburek.

== Etymology ==
The word "fleischkuekle" or "fleischkuechle" originates from the Alemannic/South Franconian and East Franconian German Fleischküchle, meaning "little meat cakes". In Crimean Tatar cuisine, the food is called cheburek; this word is also used by some German-Russian North Dakotans.

== History ==
Fleischkuekle gained popularity among Germans who settled in the Crimea region of the Russian Empire, who adapted the tradition from Crimean Tatars. Therefore, the distribution of its popularity follows the settlement patterns of these immigrants in North Dakota; fleischkuekle are most popular in Emmons, McIntosh, and Mercer counties.

1987, Golden Fleischkuechle began mass producing the pastry for distribution and sale across North Dakota, Minnesota, and Montana. The city of Stanton received a $43,800 loan from Community Development Block Grant to build a local plant, which began production on August 3. In the first year, the plant produced about 500,000 fleischkuekle. In 2015, production shifted to a new plant in Leeds.

== Preparation and serving ==
Fleischkuekle are turnovers deep fried in grease or oil. The main filling is ground meat, particularly beef; however, the first iterations of the dish in Crimea used mutton. They are traditionally eaten without the use of silverware.

The dish is particularly common at main-street diners and on menus at fraternal organizations around the state. In Mercer County, diners typically provide pickles and ketchup on the side. The dish is served with gravy in Fargo. In Beulah, the local Dairy Queen franchise sold them on their menu.

== See also ==
- Russian Germans in North America
- List of stuffed dishes
- Bierock
- Runza
