= Cuisine of North Dakota =

Regional cuisine of the United States

The cuisine of North Dakota differs from average Midwestern cuisine in a number of ways. Though much of the Midwest has strong German influences, North Dakota also has a strong influence from Norway as well as the many ethnic Germans from Russia who settled there. There is also a strong Native American influence on the cuisine of North Dakota. Plants used as food by Native Americans are described in the North Dakota Ethnobotany database.

As in the Midwest as a whole, meals are typically served in a smorgasbord format rather than as courses.

Churches throughout the state commonly host annual fellowship dinners open to the community. Perhaps one of the largest authentic Norwegian dinners is the annual lutefisk dinner hosted by the First Lutheran Church, Williston, North Dakota, every February.

The largest Scandinavian Festival in North America is the annual Norsk Høstfest held every October, in Minot, North Dakota. This five-day cultural event features Scandinavian dishes (Norway, Sweden, Denmark, Finland and Iceland), but does accommodate those who are not fond of lutefisk by providing many other choices of ethnic foods.

== Notable dishes ==
German-influenced:

- Kuchen
- Summer sausage

German–Russian-influenced:

- Fleischkuekle
- Knoephla

Norwegian-influenced:

- Lefse
- Krumkake
- Lutefisk
- Raspeball/komle/klubb/potato dumplings

Other dishes

- Hotdish
- Chokecherry dishes
- Frybread tacos
- Walleye
