= Pirogi =

Pirogi may refer to:

- Pierogi, filled dumplings, a traditional Polish dish
- Pirog, a baked case of dough with sweet or savory filling, common in Eastern European cuisines
