= Pirozhki =

Fried/baked filled bun common in Eastern European cuisine

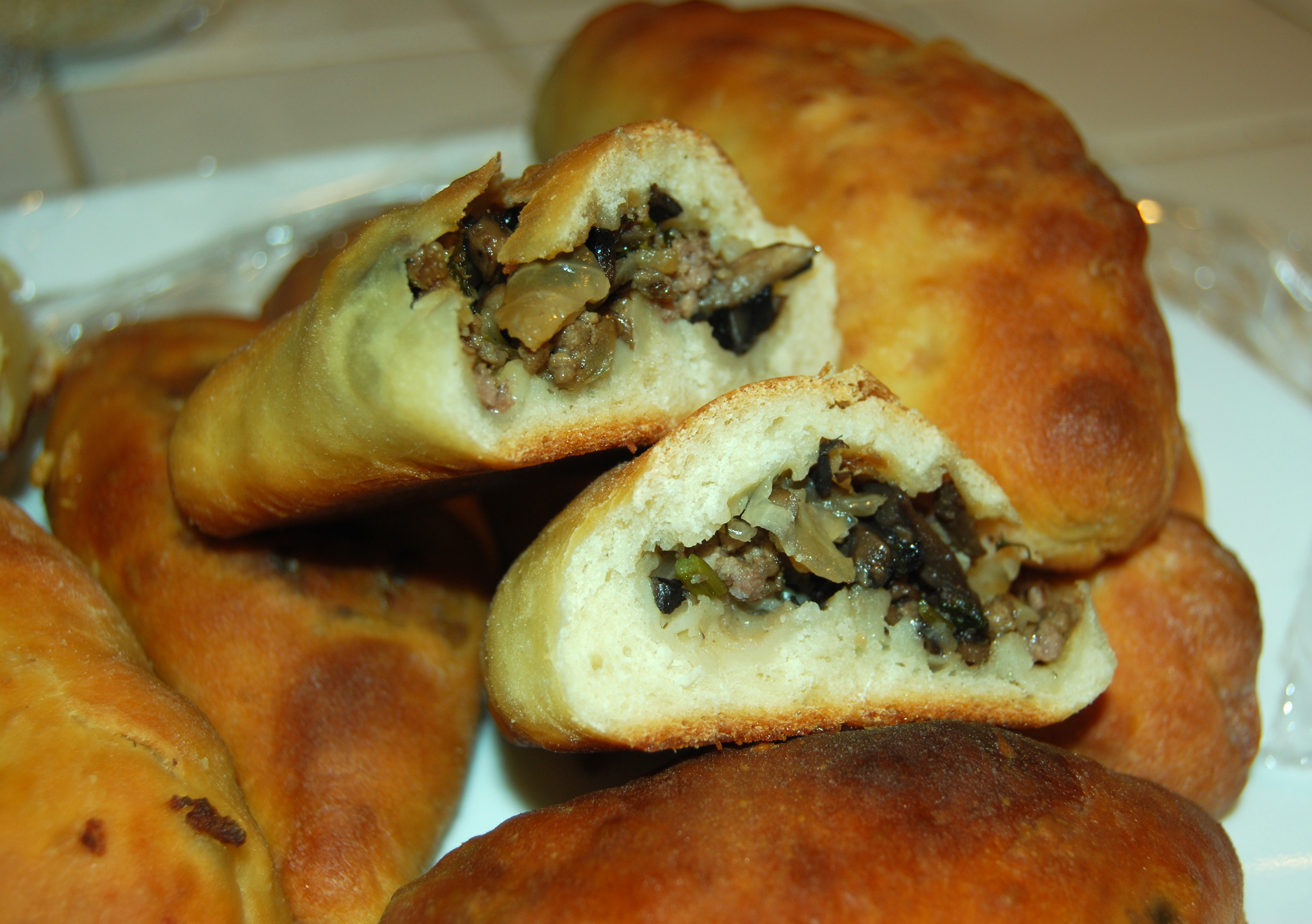
- Baked piroshki stuffed with meat, rice, onion and mushroom
- Alternative names: Piroshki, pirazhki, pyrizhky, piroška, perishki
- Course: Appetizer, main, dessert
- Associated cuisine: Armenian, Ashkenazi Jewish, Azerbaijani, Belarusian, Croatian, Estonian, Iranian, Kazakh, Kyrgyz, Latvian, Macedonian, Mennonite, Mongolian, Pontic Greek, Russian, Serbian, Tajik, Turkmen, Ukrainian, Uzbek
- Serving temperature: Warm or hot
- Main ingredients: Yeast dough, various fillings
- Variations: Multiple

Pirozhki (Note: Also transliterated as piroshki) (Russian: пирожки, IPA: [pʲɪrɐʂˈkʲi]; sing. пирожок, pirozhok; see also other names) is the Russian name for baked or fried yeast-leavened boat-shaped buns with a variety of fillings in Russian and Eastern European cuisine in general. Pirozhki are a popular street food and comfort food. They are especially popular in countries with large ethnic Russian communities, and may also be found in other parts of the world.

The word pirozhki is a diminutive of pirog, the Russian name for pie.

== Terminology ==
The word pirozhki comes from Russian: пирожки (lit. 'smallpies'), with the stress being on the last syllable: [pʲɪrɐʂˈkʲi]. Pirozhok (Note: Also transliterated as piroshok) (Russian: пирожок, romanized: pirožók, IPA: [pʲɪrɐˈʐok], singular) is the diminutive form of Russian pirog, which means a full-sized pie. (Note: The full-sized pie can also be called by the diminutive name for purely stylistic reasons.) The word is derived from pirъ, meaning "feast" or "party".

Their names in other languages are pirazhki (Belarusian: піражкі, sing. pirazhok) and pyrizhky (Ukrainian: пиріжки, sing. pyrizhok).

Pirozhki are not to be confused with the Polish pierogi (a cognate term), which are called varenyky in Ukrainian.

== Variations ==
Typically, pirozhki are boat- or rarely crescent-shaped, made of yeast-leavened dough, with filling completely enclosed. Similar Eastern European and Russian pastries (pirogs) of other shapes include coulibiac, kalitka, rasstegai, and vatrushka. Pirozhki are usually hand-sized. A smaller version may be served with soups.

Pirozhki are either fried or baked. They come in sweet or savory varieties. Common savory fillings include ground meat, mashed potato, mushrooms, boiled egg with scallions, or cabbage. Typical sweet fillings are fruit (apple, cherry, apricot, lemon), jam, or tvorog. Baked pirozhki may be glazed with egg to produce golden color. They may also be decorated with strips of dough.

According to Darra Goldstein, the pirog "is as ubiquitous in Russian life as it is in literature. Street corners are dotted with hawkers selling their pies hot from portable ovens; cafés offer meat pies along with bowls of soup... Their diminutive cousins, the pirozhki, are pocket-sized and oval. All can be made from a variety of doughs—yeast, short or flaky pastry—depending on which suits the filling best." An example she gives of its role in literature is Evenings on a Farm Near Dikanka by Nikolai Gogol.

== Regional varieties ==
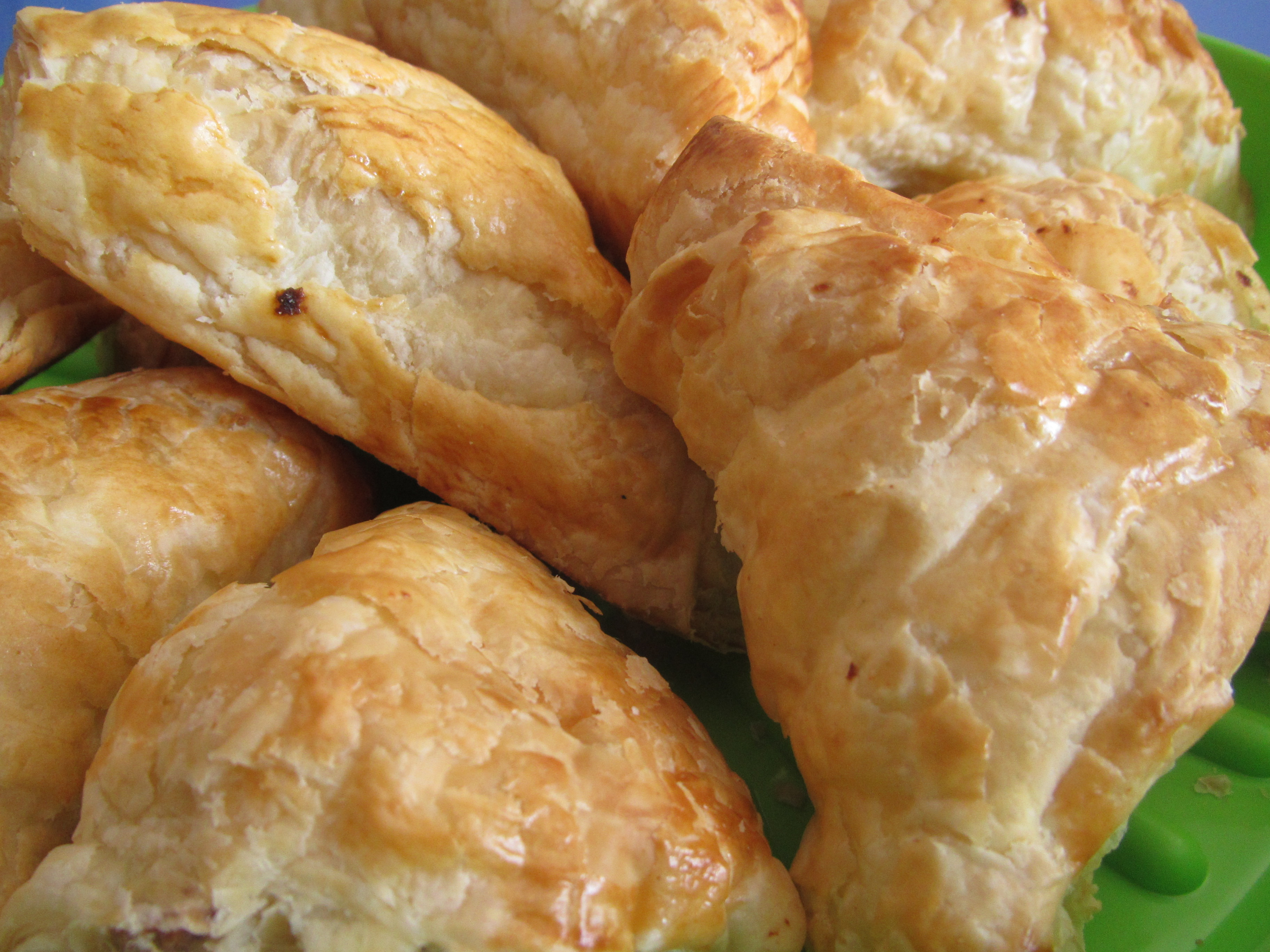
Puff pastry pirozhki

=== Americas ===
Varieties of pirozhki were brought to the Americas by Volga Germans. Known today as bierock, pirok or runza, they belong to several regional cuisines in the United States, Canada and Argentina. The populous Russian diaspora which came to the Americas as a consequence of the Russian Revolution, the Russian Civil War, and (much later) the collapse of the Soviet Union, brought with them the more classic Russian versions of pirozhki.

=== Balkans ===
The Greek variety piroski (Greek: πιροσκί) is popular in parts of Greece, in particular in Northern Greece, as brought by Pontic Greeks, and in most big cities, where they are sold, most in the past time but also less still today, as a type of fast food in specialty shops called Piroski shops, selling piroski exclusively. The Greek piroskia come fried with many different stuffings, such as Greek feta cheese or Greek kasseri cheese or minced meat or mashed potato or mix of feta cheese and ham or other filling.

In Serbia the local variety are cylindrical pastries called пирошка/piroška (piroshka). They are stuffed with fillings such as ground spiced meat mix of pork and veal or cottage cheese, and with kulen, tomato sauce and herbs. Alternatively they are made from breaded crepes with variety of fillings.

In Croatia, the name piroška (sing.), piroške (pl.) was derived from pirog, and refers to a kind of uštipci.

=== Baltics ===
In Latvia, crescent-shaped buns of leavened dough called speķrauši (literally, "fatback tarts") or speķa pīrāgi (often referred to in diminutive speķa pīrādziņi or colloquially simply pīrāgi or pīrādziņi) are traditionally filled with smoked fatback and onion. Other fillings are also possible. However the name pīrāgi is not exclusive to these buns, but can refer to variety of other pastries, such as pies and turnovers. Pīrāgi were often eaten as lunch by farmers and shepherds working the fields.

Estonians (and Finns) too have this tradition. The pirukad or saiakesed are fairly small in size and have regional variations in respect to fillings. They are usually made with puff pastry. Open pies covering the scale of whole baking tray are also popular, more similar to American pies. Many recipes exist, with meat, cabbage, carrots, rice, egg and other fillings and filling mixtures also being used. Sweet fillings are as popular as savory pirukad with fillings like apple, various berries, marzipan, various spices and jam.

=== South Caucasus ===
The Russian variant of pirozhki is a common fast food in Armenia and Azerbaijan. In Armenia it often contains a spiced mashed potato, or seasoned meat filling. In Azerbaijan it is usually made with mashed potatoes, or ground beef.

=== Central Asia ===
Pirozhki are common as fast food on the streets of the Central Asian countries in Kazakhstan, Tajikistan, Uzbekistan, Turkmenistan, Kyrgyzstan, where they were introduced by the Russians. They are also made by many Russians and non-Russians at home.

=== Finland ===
The Finnish version is the similar lihapiirakka, a popular street food made with donut dough, minced meat and rice.

=== Iran ===
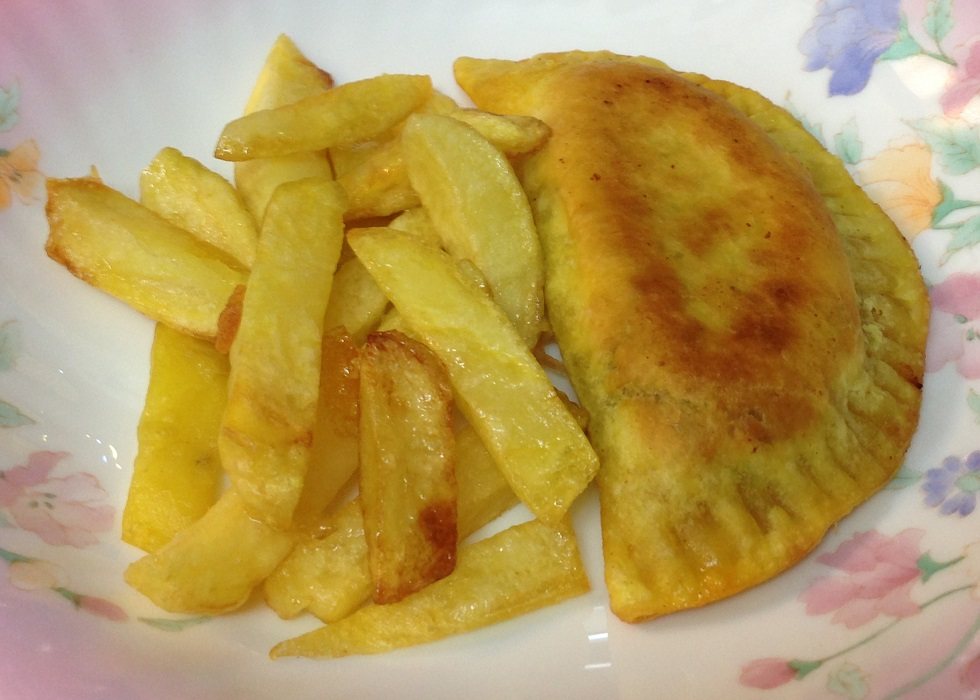
Iranian homemade pirashki and chips

The Iranian version, pirashki (Persian: پیراشکی pirāški), is often consumed as an appetizer or as a street food. It is commonly filled with pastry cream, but potato and meat fillings are also available.

=== Japan ===
The dish was introduced to Japan by White Russian refugees who sought shelter there after the Bolshevik Revolution of 1917. A localized Japanese version, called ピロシキ (piroshiki), are predominantly fried, use fillings such as ground meat, boiled egg, bean noodles, and spring onion, and are commonly breaded with panko before frying, in the manner of Japanese menchi-katsu. Another popular variation is filled with Japanese curry and is quite similar to karē-pan, which is itself said to be inspired by pirozhki.

=== Mongolia ===
Pirozhki is common as fast food in Mongolia, and it is made throughout the country by families at home.

== See also ==
- Banitsa
- Börek
- Bougatsa
- Cantiq
- Chebureki
- Coulibiac
- Empanadas
- Fatayer
- Knish
- Lihapiirakka
- List of Russian dishes
- Pasty
- Peremech
- Pierogi
- Pogača
- Runza
- Samosas
- Turnover (food)
- Uchpuchmak
- Vatrushka
