= Bierock =

Beef-filled pastry

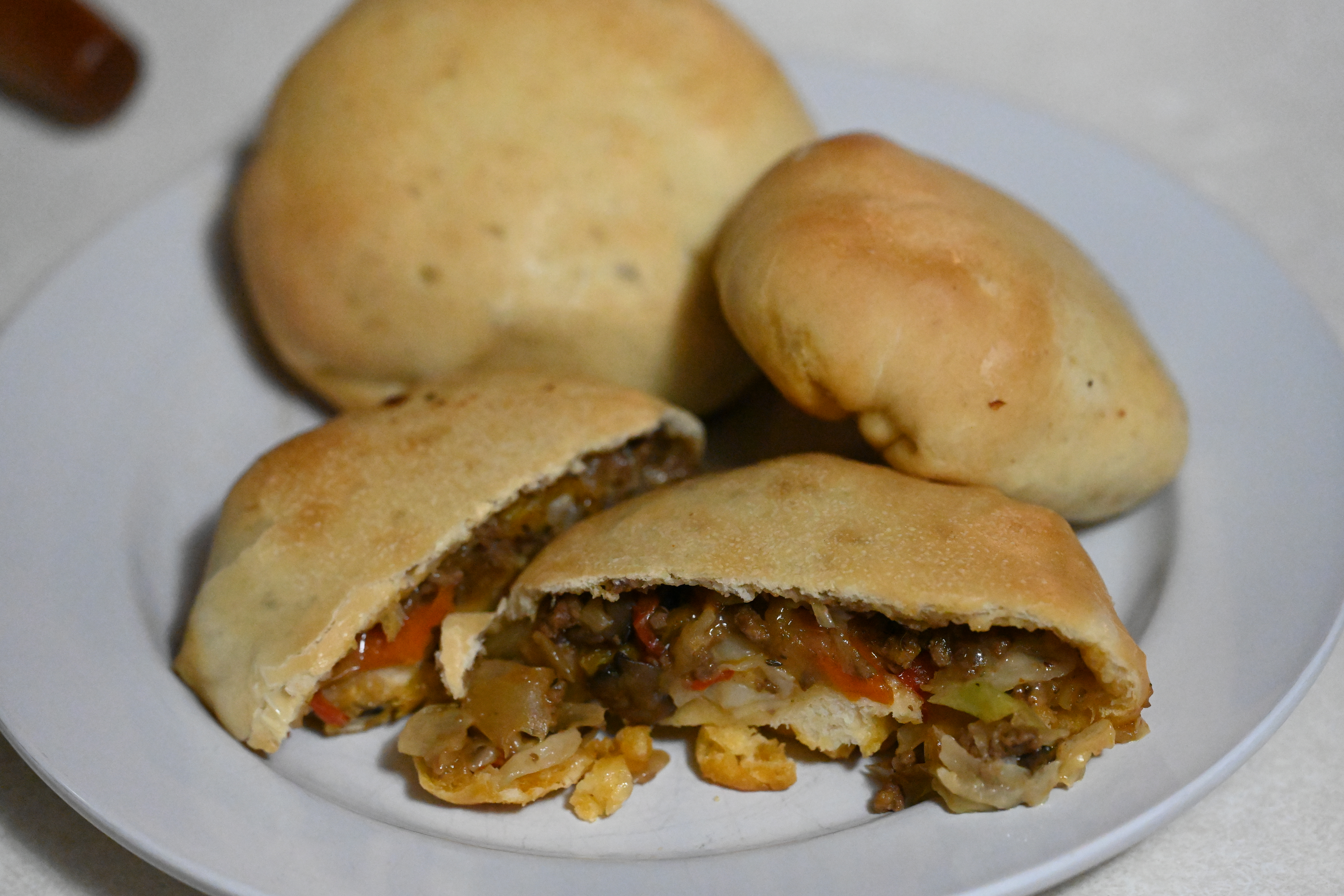
- Type: Stuffed Bread
- Course: Main
- Place of origin: Eastern Europe
- Main ingredients: Yeast dough, cabbage, onion, ground beef, seasonings
- Variations: Cheese

Bierock is a yeast dough pocket sandwich with savory filling, originating in Eastern Europe.

The dish is common among the Volga German community in the United States and Argentina. It was brought to the United States in the 1870s by German Russian Mennonite immigrants. It has developed strong cultural associations with the cuisine of the Midwestern United States, particularly in Kansas and Nebraska.

The soft yeast rolls contain some sugar, butter and eggs, and either warm water, milk, or a mix of both. The filling is a basic mix of onion, ground beef and cabbage which can be made more complicated by the addition of different cheese blends, condiments and seasonings like caraway seeds.

Bierock is similar to both pirogi/pirozhki of Russian cuisine and börek of Turkish cuisine. There is debate about the actual etymology of the word bierock. Traditionally it was supposed that bierock was derived from the Russian word pirog. However, a recent theory speculates that the word bierock may be derived from börek. This theory is based on both geographic close proximity of the former Volga German ASSR to present day Kazakhstan as well as the influence of considerable population of historically Turkic speaking peoples such as Kazakhs and Tatars living in the Volga region. Neither theory, however, has been conclusively proven.

Other spellings are bieroch, beerock, berrock, bierox, beerrock, biddicks, and kraut bierock in the U.S., and pirok or kraut pirok in Argentina.

In Argentina, the Fiesta del Pirok (Bierock Festival) takes place every July, in Crespo, Entre Ríos Province.

== See also ==
- Fleischkuekle
- Hot Pockets
- Pasty
- Pierogi
- Runza
- Vol-au-vent
- List of pastries
- List of sandwiches
