= Kurnik (pirog) =

Gourmet chicken-filled pirog in Russian cuisine

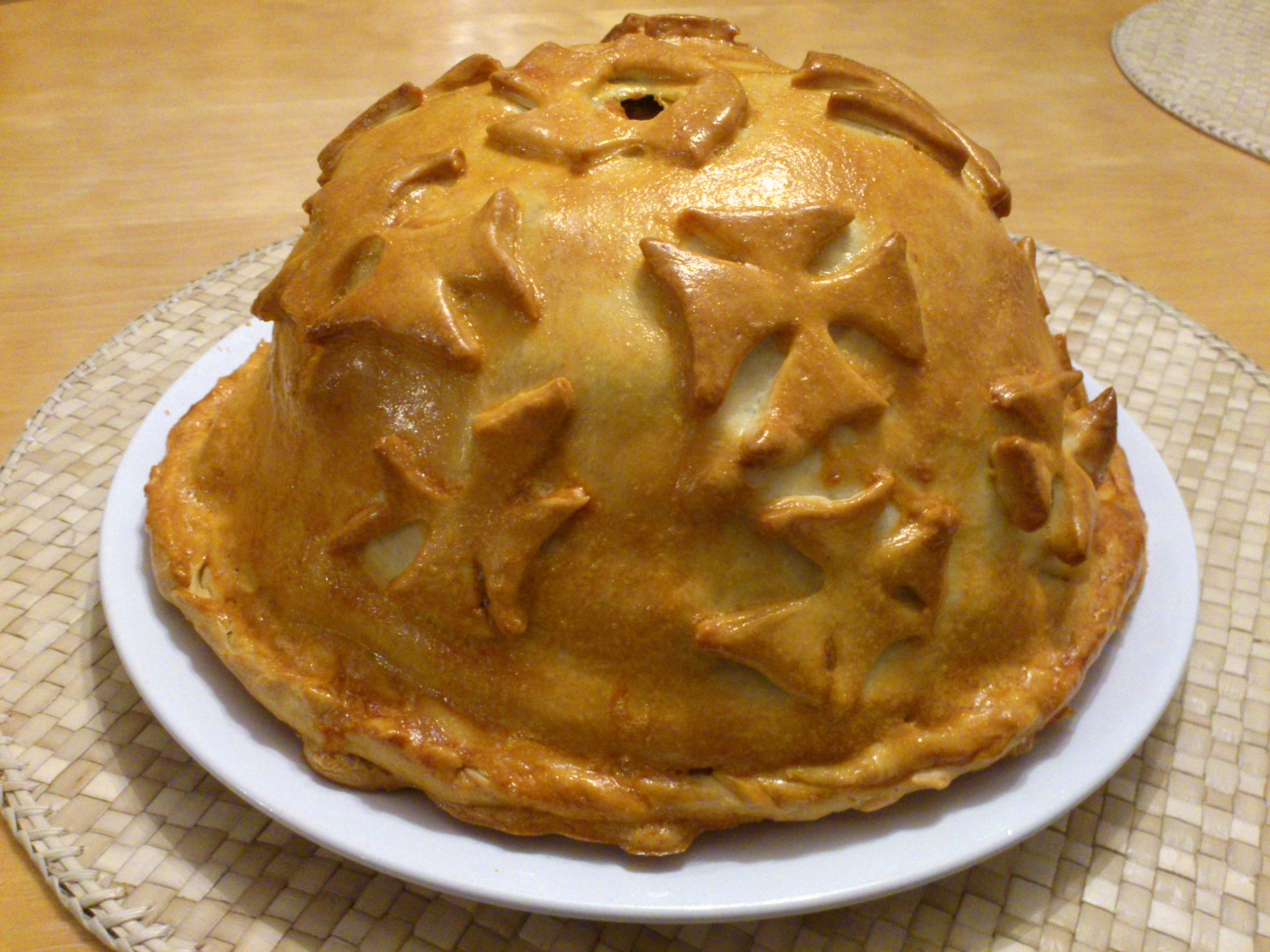
- Type: Pirog
- Place of origin: Russia
- Associated cuisine: Russian cuisine
- Main ingredients: Chicken, eggs, onions, kasha or rice
- Variations: Chicken and mushroom pie
- Food energy (per 100 g serving): 536 kcal (2,240 kJ)
Nutritional value
(per 100 g serving)
- Protein: 27.7 g
- Fat: 30.4 g
- Carbohydrate: g

Kurnik (Russian: курник; "chicken pirog"), also known as wedding pirog or tsar pirog, is a dome-shaped savoury Russian pirog (loosely, a pie) usually filled with chicken or turkey, eggs, onions, kasha or rice, and other optional components. Sometimes filled with boiled rooster combs, this pirog originated in Southern Russia, especially in Cossack communities, and was used as a "wedding pirog" in the rest of the country. It is dome-shaped, unlike any other non-sweet pirog. In special cases, it was served to the tsar himself. Even today, this pirog is served on special occasions in most of Russia.

== Customs ==
For a wedding, kurniks were made for both spouses. The groom's pirog was decorated with figures of people representing the strength of the young family. The bride, on the other hand, had her kurnik decorated with flowers, said to represent beauty and kindness.

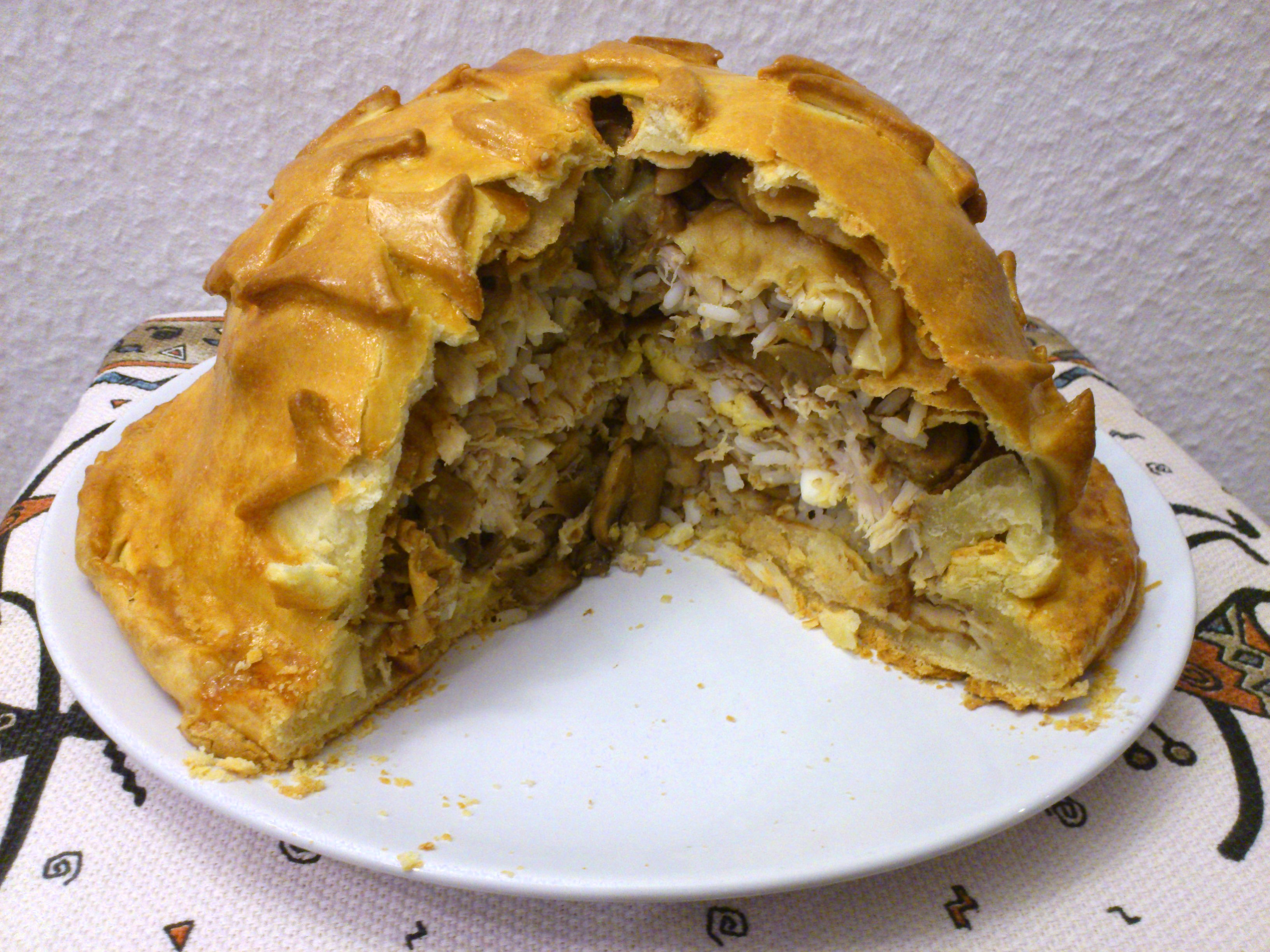
Kurnik filled with slices of chicken, mushrooms, blini, rice, eggs

== See also ==
- Comfort food
- List of pies, tarts and flans
- List of Russian dishes
