= Udmurt cuisine =

Cuisine of Udmurtia and the Udmurt people

Udmurt cuisine consists of the cuisine of Udmurtia and the Udmurt people, and is characterized by the rich use of local foods. Old traditions include foods made from grains and flour, especially milled rye, barley, wheat, and buckwheat. Meat, vegetables and black bread are staple foods in Udmurt cuisine. Additional foods include pelmeni, pancakes, pastries and small tarts. Milk is a scarce commodity, and that which exists is often made into ayran, a type of sour milk.

The Udmurt people have historically been involved in cattle breeding, agricultural production and hunting. Beekeeping is a common practice among the Udmurts and other groups in the area, and pig farming also exists. Potatoes, vegetables and flax are produced in significant quantities in Udmurtia. For total agricultural production in Russia, Udmurtia was ranked as 33rd.

== Pelmeni ==
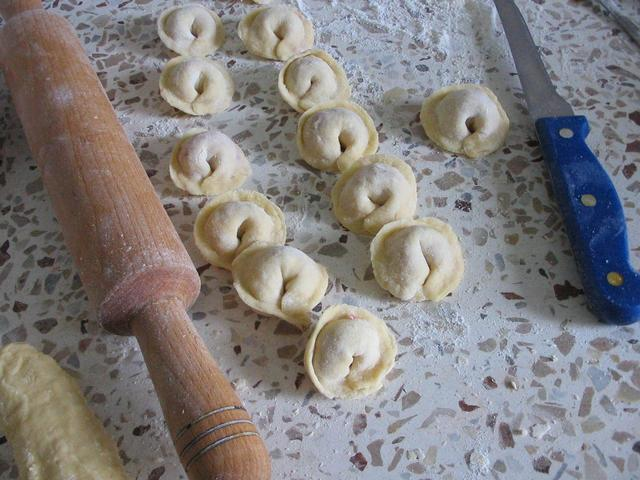
Pelmeni

Dumplings (pelmeni) are the most well-known Udmurt national dish, and in Udmurt are called pelnan, which means "ear bread" (пельнянь: пель − ear, нянь – bread). This "ear-bread" is made using various fillings that range from mushrooms and berries to meat and cabbage. Pelmeni-making has traditionally been an autumn task. They are prepared in large quantities, preserved in the cold, and then eaten over the course of the winter.

The importance of pelmeni to Udmurt culture is emphasized by the fact that in 2004, a monument was unveiled in the Udmurt capital of Izhkar (Izhevsk), which depicts a one-meter-wide pelmeni stuck on the end of a three-meter-long fork.

== Perepechi ==
"Perepech" is also one of the most well-known dishes of Udmurt cuisine. It resembles a small open pie (similar to a vatrushka) with a diameter of 4–12 cm, filled with meat, egg, mushroom, or vegetable (such as cabbage, nettle, or horsetail) filling, usually topped with a mixture of egg or egg and milk. It is traditionally baked over an open fire from unleavened rye dough and served hot.

== See also ==
- Russian cuisine
- Tatar cuisine
