= Runza (restaurant) =

American fast food restaurant chain

Runza National, Inc.
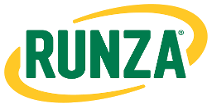
- Runza logo (2017–present)

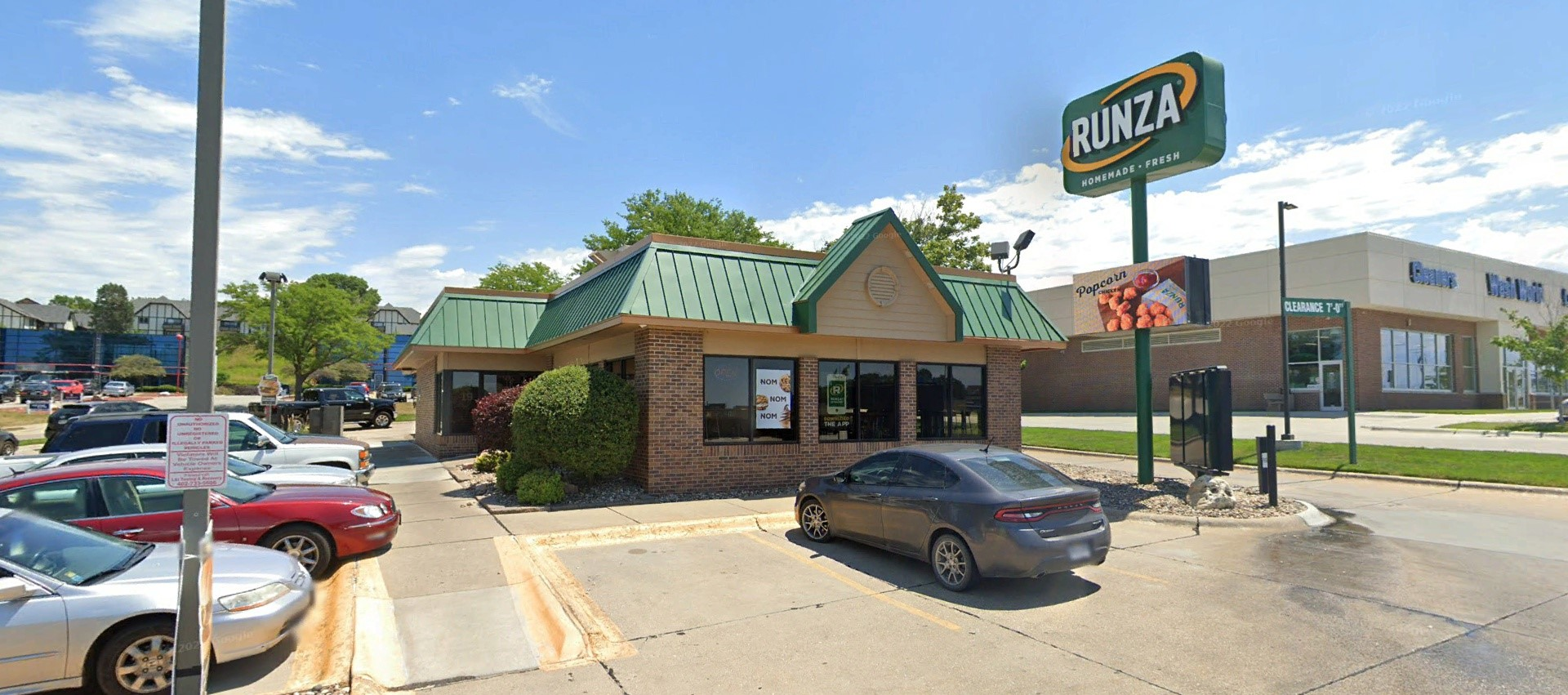
- Runza restaurant in Omaha, Nebraska, July 2022
- Trade name: Runza
- Company type: Private
- Industry: Fast food
- Founded: 1949; 77 years ago in Lincoln, Nebraska
- Founder: Sarah "Sally" Everett; Alex Brening
- Headquarters: Lincoln, Nebraska, U.S.
- Number of locations: 93 (as of September 2024)
- Area served: Nebraska; Iowa; Colorado; Kansas
- Key people: Sally Everett, Alex Brening & Donald Everett, Sr.
- Products: Runza sandwiches, chili and cinnamon rolls, hamburgers, chicken strips
- Services: Fast food
- Website: runza.com

Runza Restaurant (formerly called Runza Drive-Inn and Runza Hut) is an American fast food restaurant chain in the Midwestern United States whose flagship menu item is the runza sandwich.

== History ==
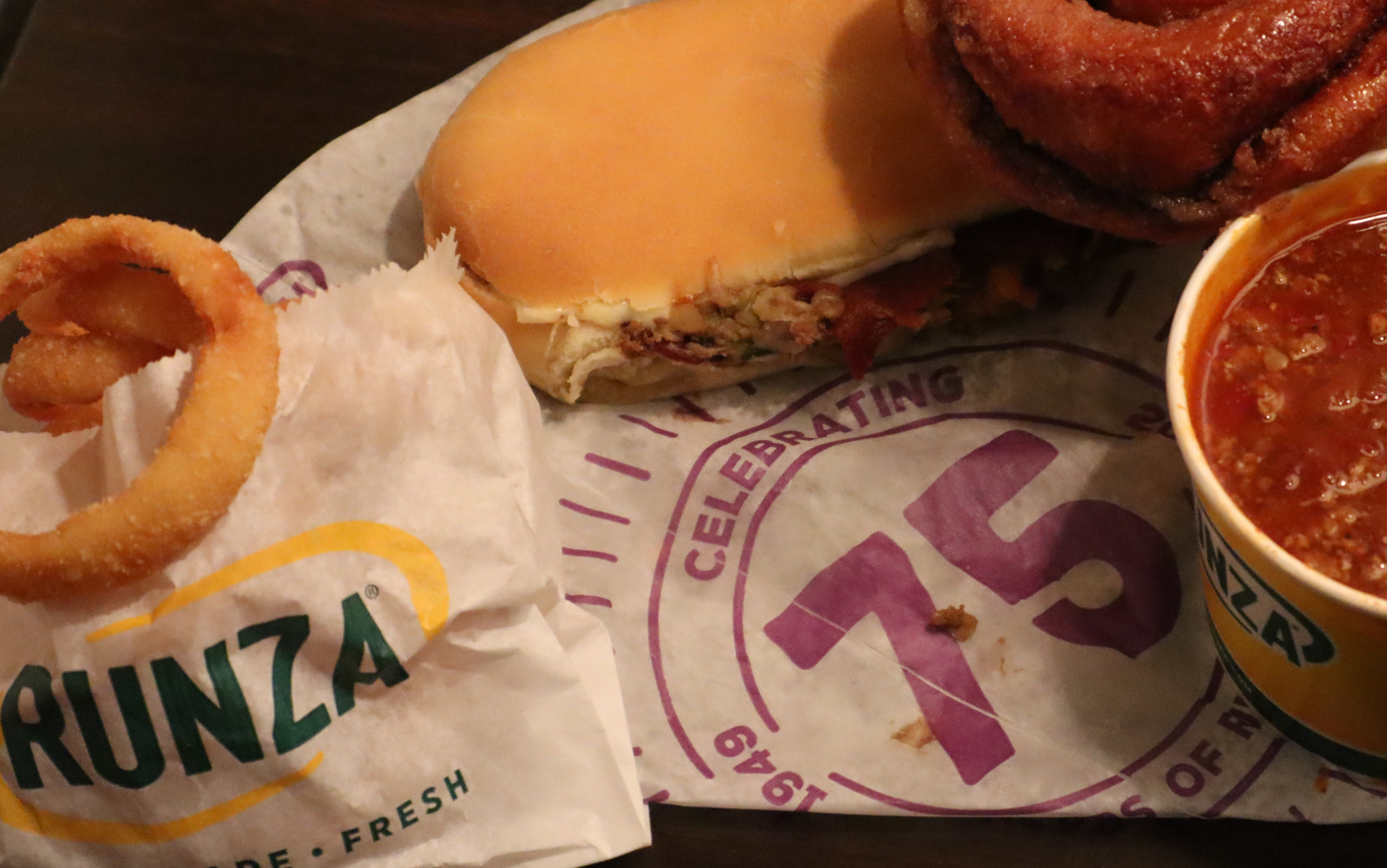
Runza meal: onion rings, runza, cinnamon roll, and chili

Founded in 1949 by Sally Everett, the chain began its expansion under Sally's son Donald Everett Sr. in 1966, and started franchising restaurants in 1979. As of November 2020, there are 85 Runza restaurants operating: 80 in Nebraska, two in Iowa, two in Colorado, and one in Kansas. The restaurant chain is still owned by the Everett family, and Sally's grandson Donald Everett Jr. serves as President. In addition to the namesake sandwich, the chain serves chili and cinnamon rolls (another Midwest dish), as well as other fast food staples like hamburgers, french fries and onion rings.

The chain attempted to expand beyond the region in 1989. Executives tried to open a restaurant in the Latvian republic of the Soviet Union, going as far as shipping two hundred frozen Runza sandwiches to the Soviet Ministry of Agriculture as a part of its negotiations. The deal fell apart after Latvia was invaded by the Soviet government in an attempt to keep it in the Union. Stores did open in the Las Vegas Strip at the Fashion Show Mall's food court and a mall food court in Moline, Illinois but both failed to gain traction and closed within a few years.

== Promotions ==
Runza is a vendor in Memorial Stadium, home of the Nebraska Cornhuskers football team, In 2017, the Omaha Storm Chasers, Omaha's Triple-A affiliate of the Kansas City Royals Major League Baseball team, rebranded themselves as the "Omaha Runzas" in a cross-promotional event. The team's rebranded uniforms featured a cartoon runza sandwich and shared the green and yellow livery of the Runza restaurant chain. Runza operated a 1950s themed Rock n' Roll Runza featuring memorabilia, vintage automobiles and roller skating carhops out of downtown Lincoln from 1991 to 2004.

=== Temperature Tuesday ===
In 2010, Runza introduced their Temperature Tuesdays promotion. In January and February, the coldest temperature at a Runza at 6AM would be the price of an original Runza sandwich with the purchase of medium french fries and a drink (ex. if the coldest temperature at a Runza was 11° at Ogallala, an original Runza would be 11¢ with purchase of a medium fry and drink). If the temperature was below zero, a Runza would be free with the purchase of a medium fry and drink. The promotion has since been shortened to only take place in January.

=== Breakfast Runzas ===
A breakfast Runza with scrambled eggs, sausage, cream cheese, green peppers, onion, and American cheese was sold at a few locations in the 1980s but did not stay on the menu. In 2024 and 2025, Runza would bring back the Breakfast Runza for one day only at select locations, with all the proceeds going to charity. Breakfast Runzas were sold in Lincoln in April of 2024, Hastings (where the breakfast Runza recipe originated from) in July of 2024, Omaha in September of 2024, and Broken Bow in October of 2025.

== Nebraska Union controversy ==
The Runza restaurant operating in the Nebraska Union, the student union at the University of Nebraska–Lincoln (UNL), closed in 2018 after a decade of operating in the location. The Runza was outbid by a combination of two vendors (Steak 'n Shake and Chick-fil-A franchisees) bidding together. There was public outcry from the student body, as the runza is strongly identified as a Nebraskan dish, and students felt that it should be sold on UNL's campus. Runza eventually returned to the university in 2025.
