= Runza =

Filled bread pocket

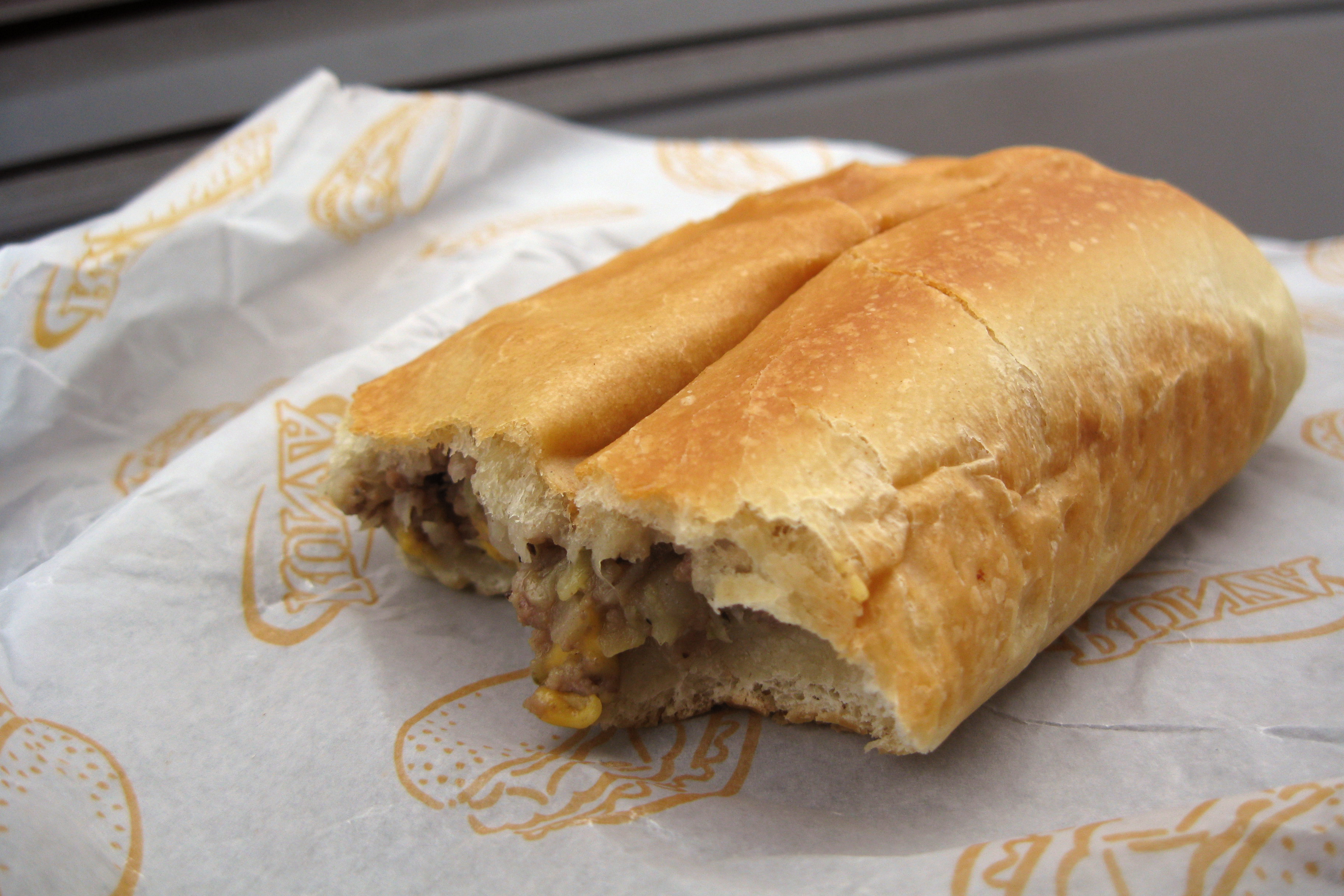
- A runza
- Course: Main
- Place of origin: United States
- Region or state: Nebraska
- Main ingredients: Bread, Ground beef, Cabbage, Seasonings, Onion
- Variations: Cheddar cheese, Swiss cheese & mushrooms, Italian style, jalapeños, vegetarian
- Food energy (per serving): 530 (Standard/"Original")

A runza (also called a krautburger, or kraut pirok) is a yeast dough bread pocket with a filling consisting of ground beef, cabbage or sauerkraut, onions, and seasonings. Runzas can be baked into various shapes such as a half-moon, a rectangle, a round (bun), a square, or a triangle. The runzas sold by the Runza restaurant chain are rectangular while many of the bierocks sold in Kansas are round buns.

The runza is a regional cuisine of Nebraska, with some commentators calling it "as Nebraskan as Cornhusker football." It is served by the Nebraska Society of Washington, D.C., and the Nebraska Society of New York at their Taste of Nebraska events and was chosen to represent the state at Flavored Nation, an event serving iconic dishes from all fifty states.

== History ==
The runza sandwich originated from the pirog, an Eastern European baked good or more specifically from its small version, known as pirozhok (literally "little pirog"). In the 18th century, Volga Germans (ethnic Germans who settled in the Volga River valley in the Russian Empire at the invitation of Catherine the Great because of their skill in farming), adapted the pirog /pirozhok to create the bierock, a yeast pastry sandwich with similar savory ingredients. When the political climate turned against the Volga Germans as part of Russification including the threat of conscription into the Russian army beginning in 1871, many emigrated to the United States, creating communities across the Great Plains. These immigrants, including the Brening family that settled near Sutton, Nebraska, brought their bierock recipes with them. Sarah "Sally" Everett (née Brening), originally of Sutton, is credited with adapting her family's bierock recipe into the runza and also inventing the name for the sandwich. In 1949, Everett went into business selling runzas with her brother Alex in Lincoln, founding the Runza restaurant chain.

=== Etymology ===
Many sources agree that Sally Everett invented the name "runza" although it is likely she adapted it from an existing name for the sandwich; either the krautrunz, an older, different German name for the bierock, or the Low German runsa, meaning "belly", alluding to the gently rounded shape of the pouch pastry. The modern German Ranzen, also meaning satchel, derives from runsa. The word "runza" is registered as a trademark in the United States, held by the Runza restaurant chain.

== See also ==
- Fleischkuekle
- List of American sandwiches
- List of regional dishes of the United States
- List of sandwiches
- List of stuffed dishes
