= Pirog =

Pastry of Eastern European origin

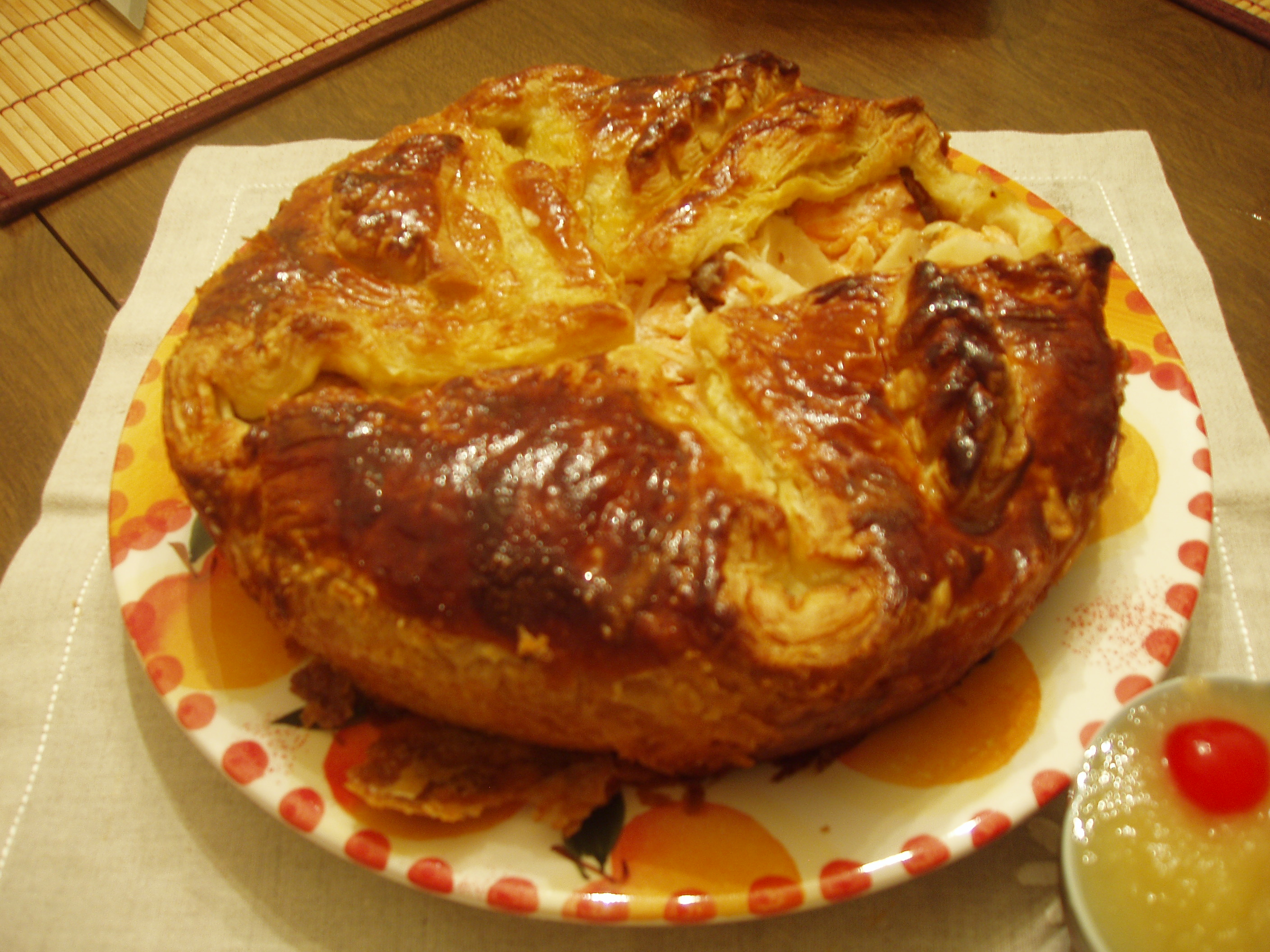
- A fish pirog
- Alternative names: Pirogi
- Region or state: Eastern Europe, Northern Europe

Pirog (Russian: пирог, IPA: [pʲɪˈrok]; Ukrainian: пиріг, romanized: pyrih, IPA: [pɪˈriɦ], pl. пироги, pyrohy; Belarusian: пірог [pʲiˈrɔx]; Northern Sami: pirog; Latvian: pīrāgs, pl. pīrāgi; Lithuanian: pyragas, pl. pyragai; Finnish: piirakka [ˈpiːrɑkːɑ]; Estonian: pirukas [ˈpiːrukːɑs]; Swedish: pirog [pɪˈroːɡ]; Karelian: piirai [ˈpiːrɑi̯]) is a baked case of dough with either sweet or savory filling. The dish is common in Finnish and Eastern European cuisines.

The name is derived from the ancient Proto-Slavic word pir, meaning "banquet" or "festivity". The Russian plural, pirogi (with the stress on the last syllable), should not be confused with pierogi (stress on "ro" in Polish and English) in Polish cuisine, which are dumplings similar to Russian pelmeni or varenyky.

== Shape ==
Pirogi come in different shapes and forms: they are often oblong with tapering ends, but can also be circular or rectangular. They can be closed or open-faced with no crust on top.

== Dough ==
Pirogi are usually made from yeast-raised dough, which distinguishes them from pies and pastries common in other cuisines. In former times, the dough for Russian pirogi was made predominantly of rye flour. Later it was mixed with wheat flour. Nowadays, mainly wheat flour is used.

There are also variants made from shortcrust, flaky or puff pastry. In East-Slavic languages, pirog is a generic term which denotes virtually any kind of pie, pastry, or cake. Thus, Karelian pastry (known as karelskiye pirozhki in Russian), Jewish knish or charlotte cake are considered types of pirog in Eastern Europe.

== Filling ==
The filling for pirogi may be sweet and contain tvorog or cottage cheese, fruits like apples, plums or various berries, as well as jam, honey, nuts or poppy seeds. Savory versions may consist of meat, fish, poultry, variety meats, eggs, mushrooms, cabbage, scallions, rice, buckwheat groats, potato or a mixture of those. In Ukrainian and Russian cuisines, pirogi (as well as their smaller versions called pirozhki) with a savory filling may be served as an accompaniment with clear borscht, broth, or consommé, or enjoyed on their own.

== Types ==
Certain types of pirog are known by different names:

- Coulibiac, a middle-size Russian pirog of oblong shape with a complex filling;
- Kurnik ("chicken pirog"), also known as wedding pirog or tsar pirog, a dome-shaped savory Russian pirog, usually filled with chicken, eggs, onions, kasha or rice, and other optional components;
- Poppy seed roll and nut roll, popular throughout Central and Eastern Europe, are considered types of pirog in Eastern Europe;
- Pirozhki (Russian diminutive, literally "small pirogi") or pyrizhky (Ukrainian), individual-sized buns that can be eaten with one hand;
- Rasstegai ("unbuttoned pirog"), a type of Russian pirog with a hole in the top;
- Shanga, a small or medium-size open-faced circular savory pirog endemic to and widespread in Ural and Siberia; "Shanga is a bakery product made of unleavened or yeast, wheat, rye or rye-wheat dough. The dish is of Finno-Ugric origin, spread from Karelia to the Ob, including the Russian North. It is part of the national cuisines: Komi cuisine, Mari cuisine, North Russian cuisine, Udmurt cuisine."
- Vatrushka, a small sweet pirog, popular in all Eastern Slavic cuisines, formed as a ring of dough with quark in the middle.

Similar West Slavic pastries, such as Czech and Slovak Kolach, and Polish Kołacz, usually have sweet fillings.

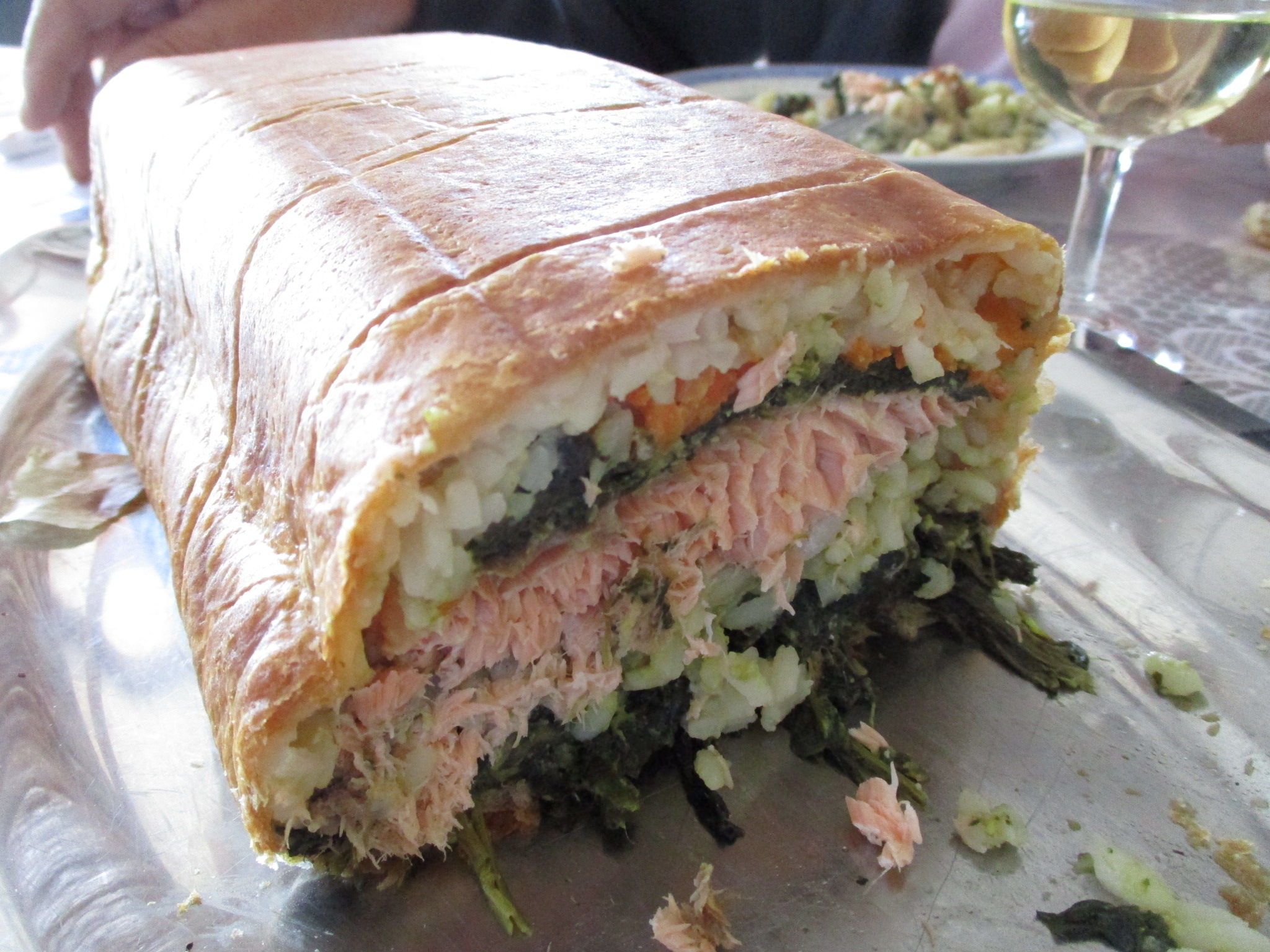
Coulibiac

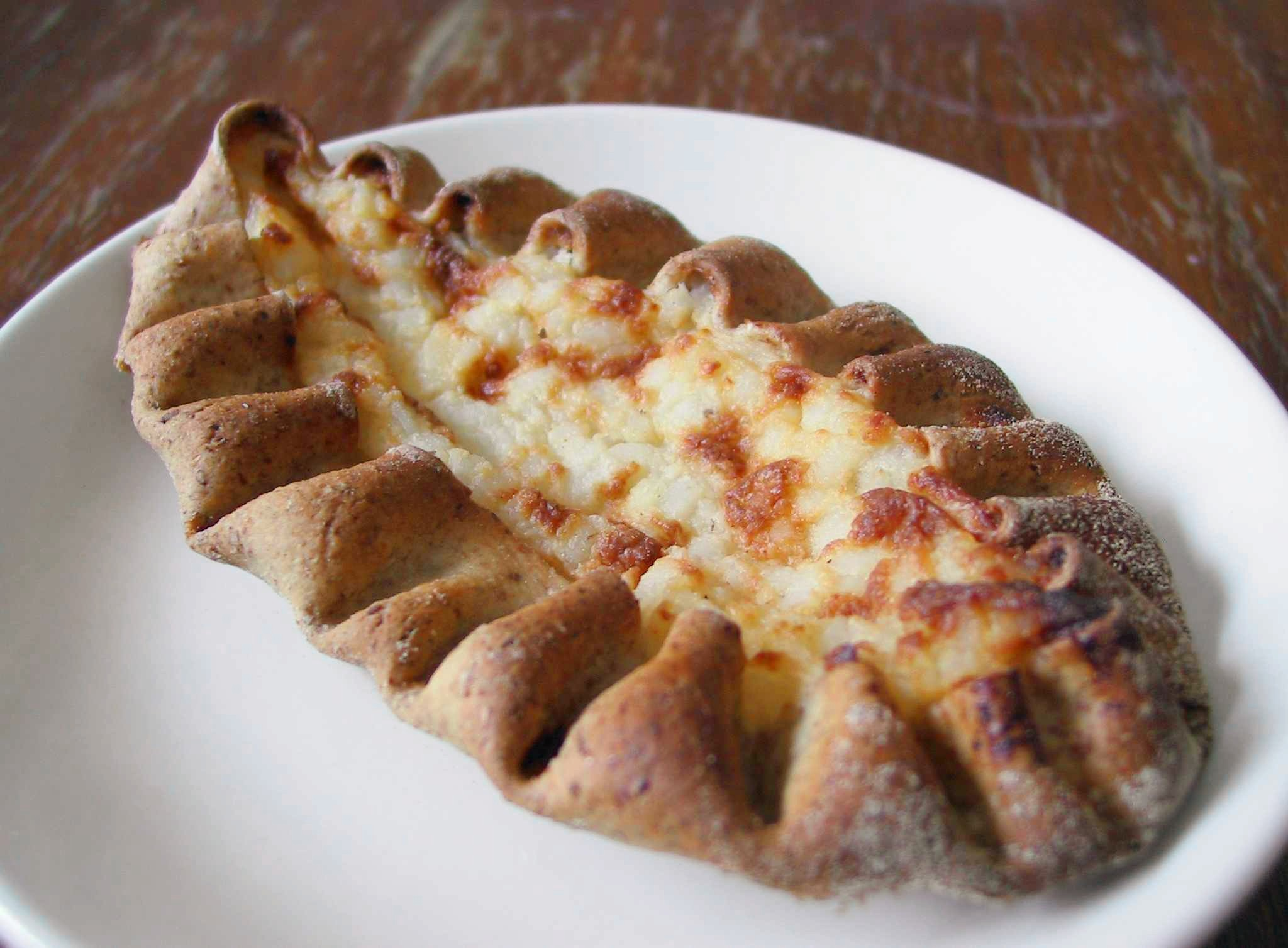
Karelian pasty

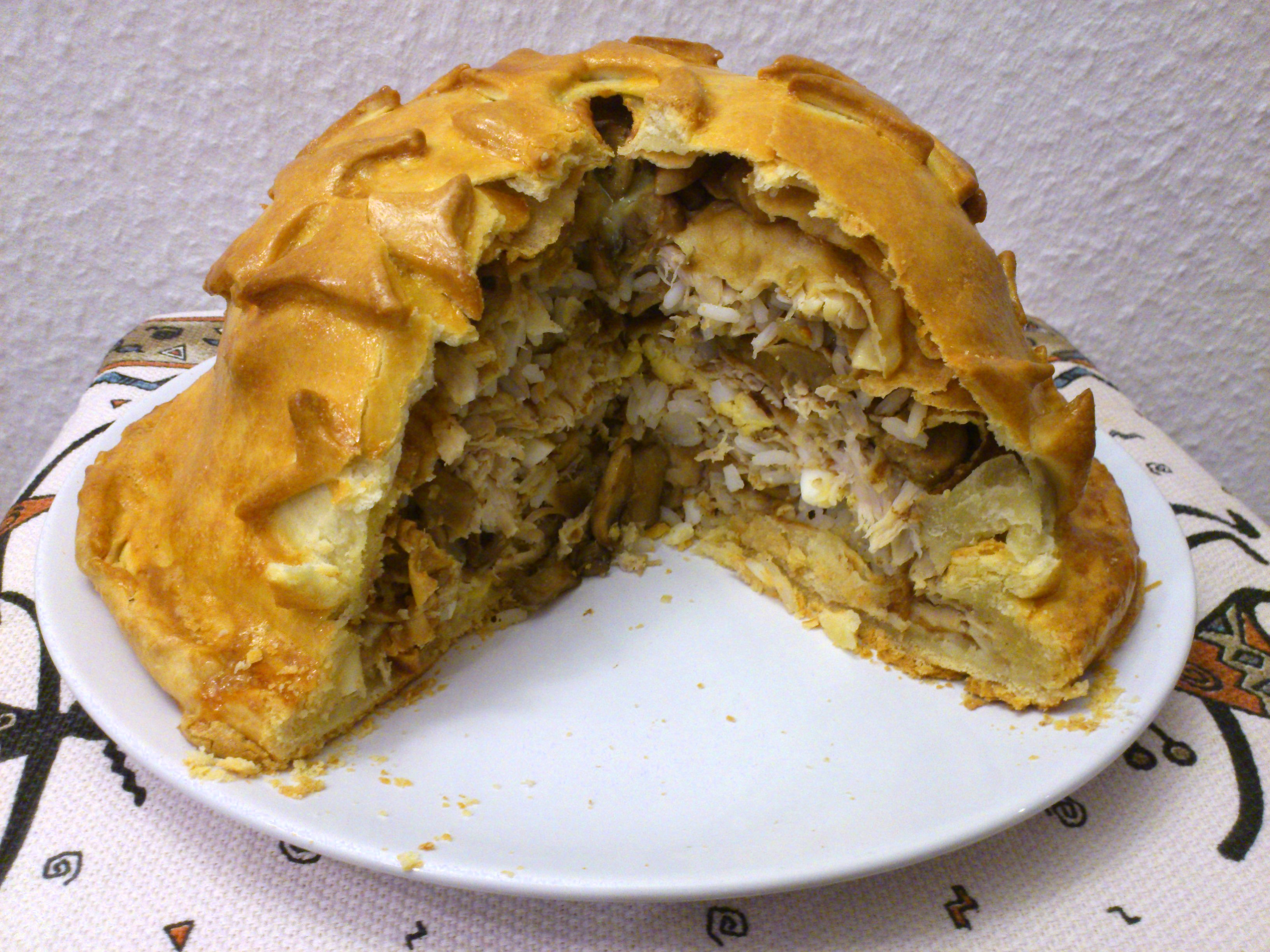
Kurnik

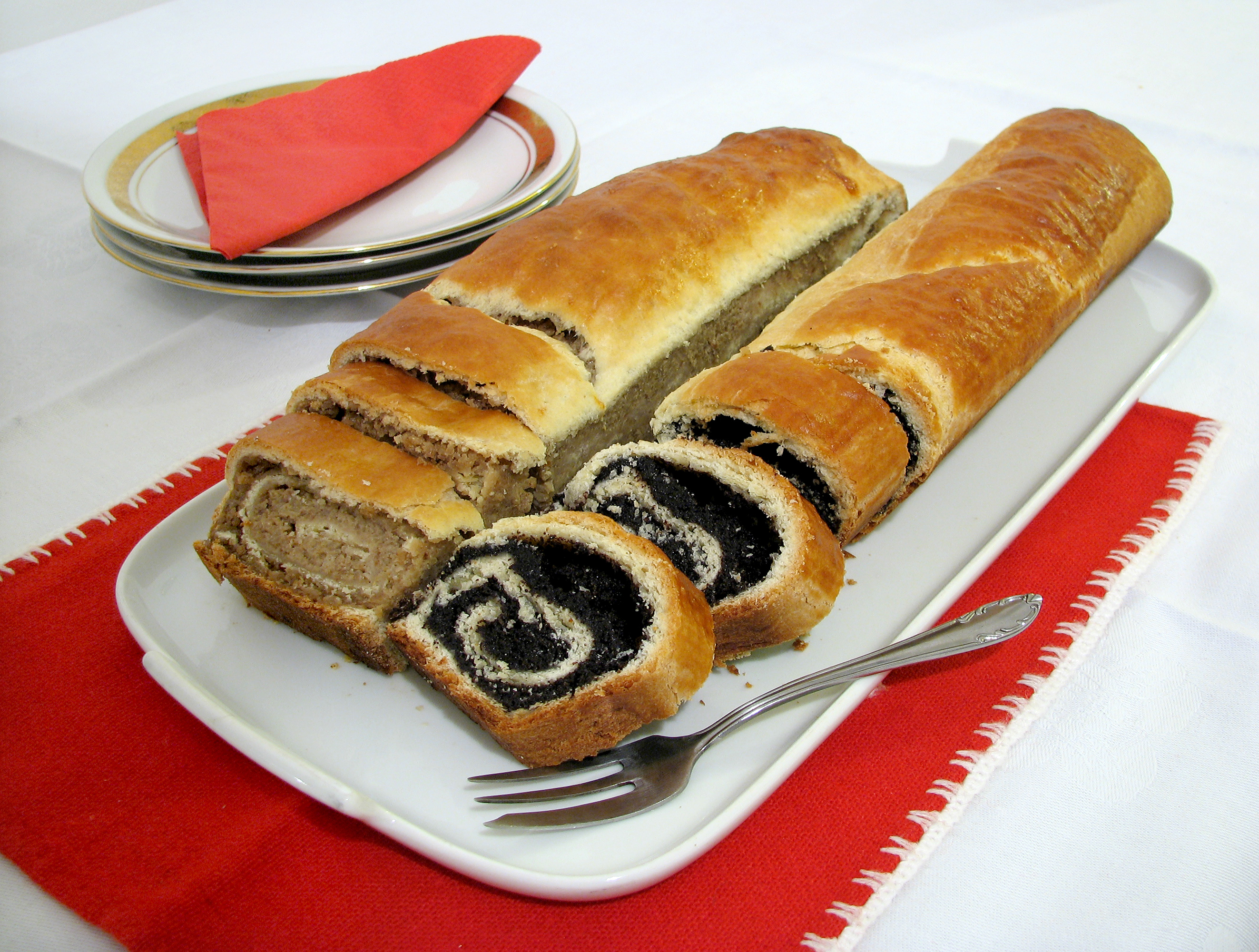
poppy seed and nut roll

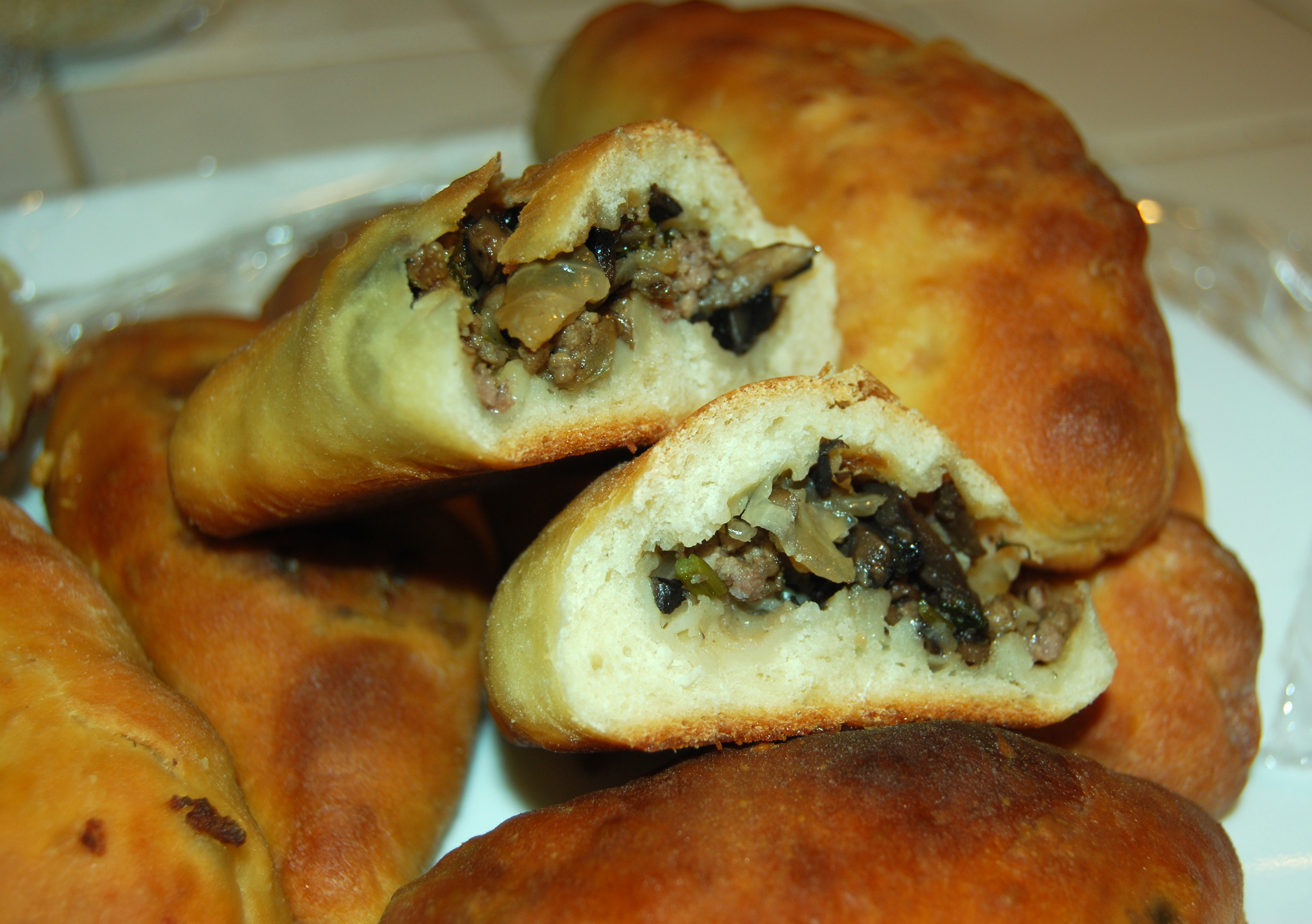
Pirozhki

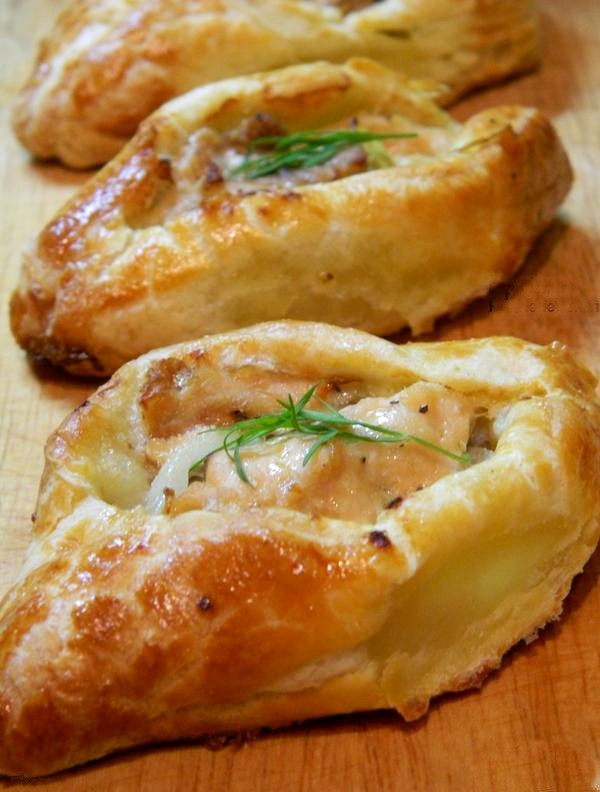
Rasstegai

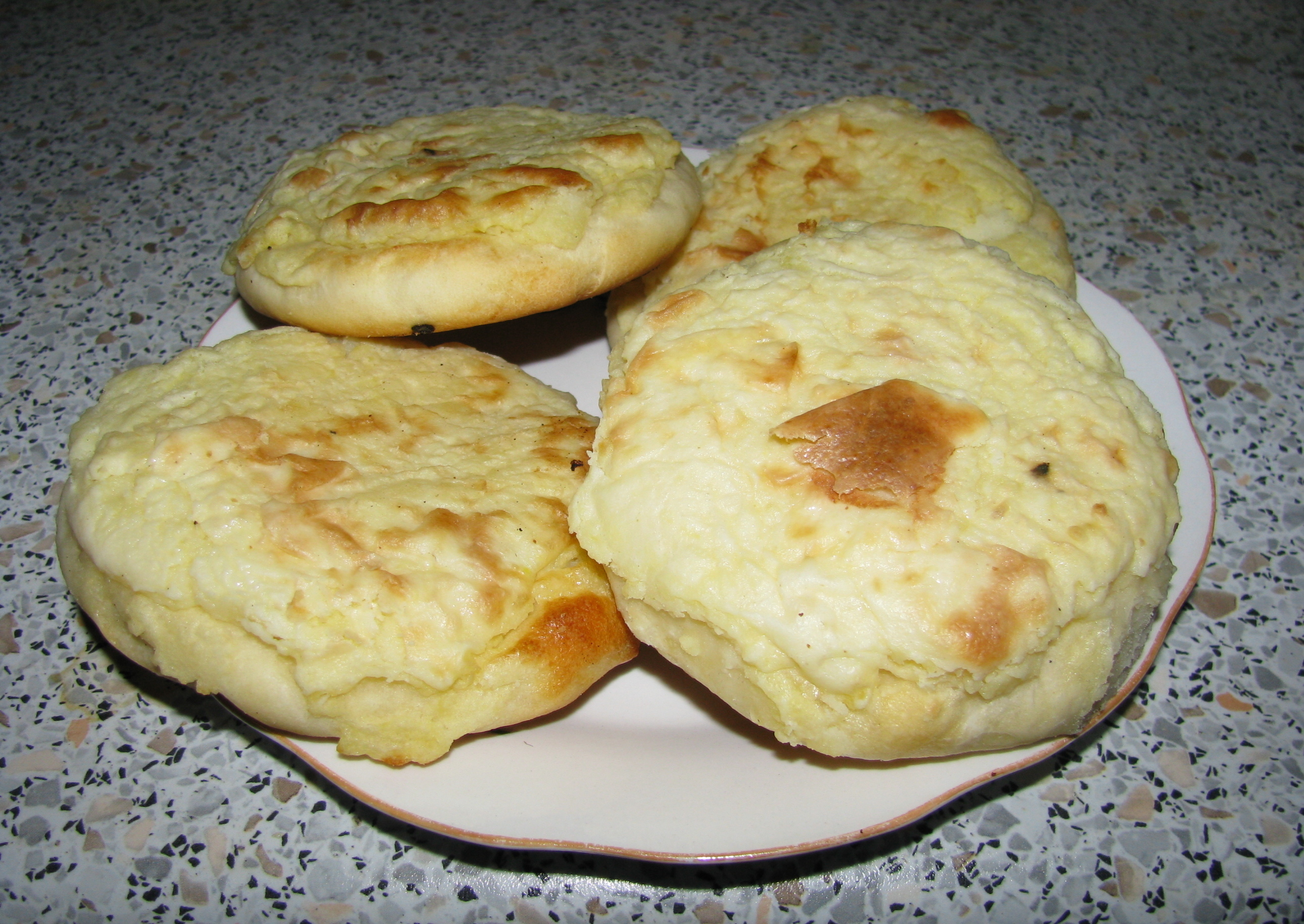
Shangi

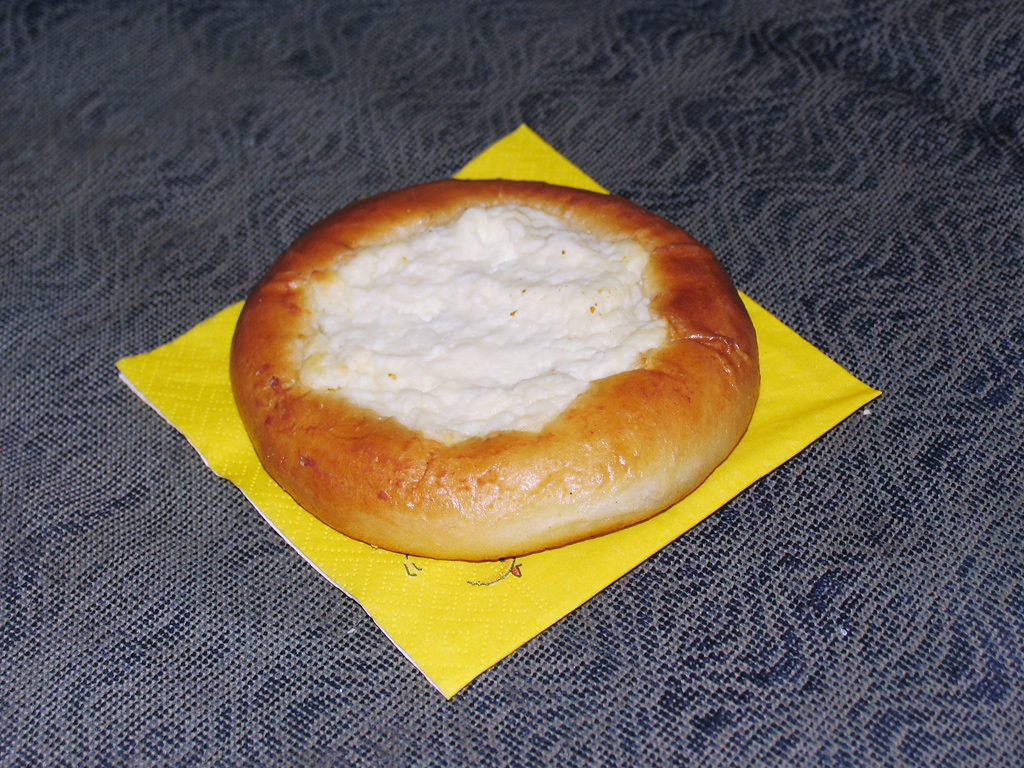
Vatrushka

== See also ==
- Burek
- Bierock or runza
- Cornish Pasty
- List of Russian dishes
- Khachapuri
- Comfort food
- Pie
- Pastry
