= Vatrushka =

Eastern European pastry

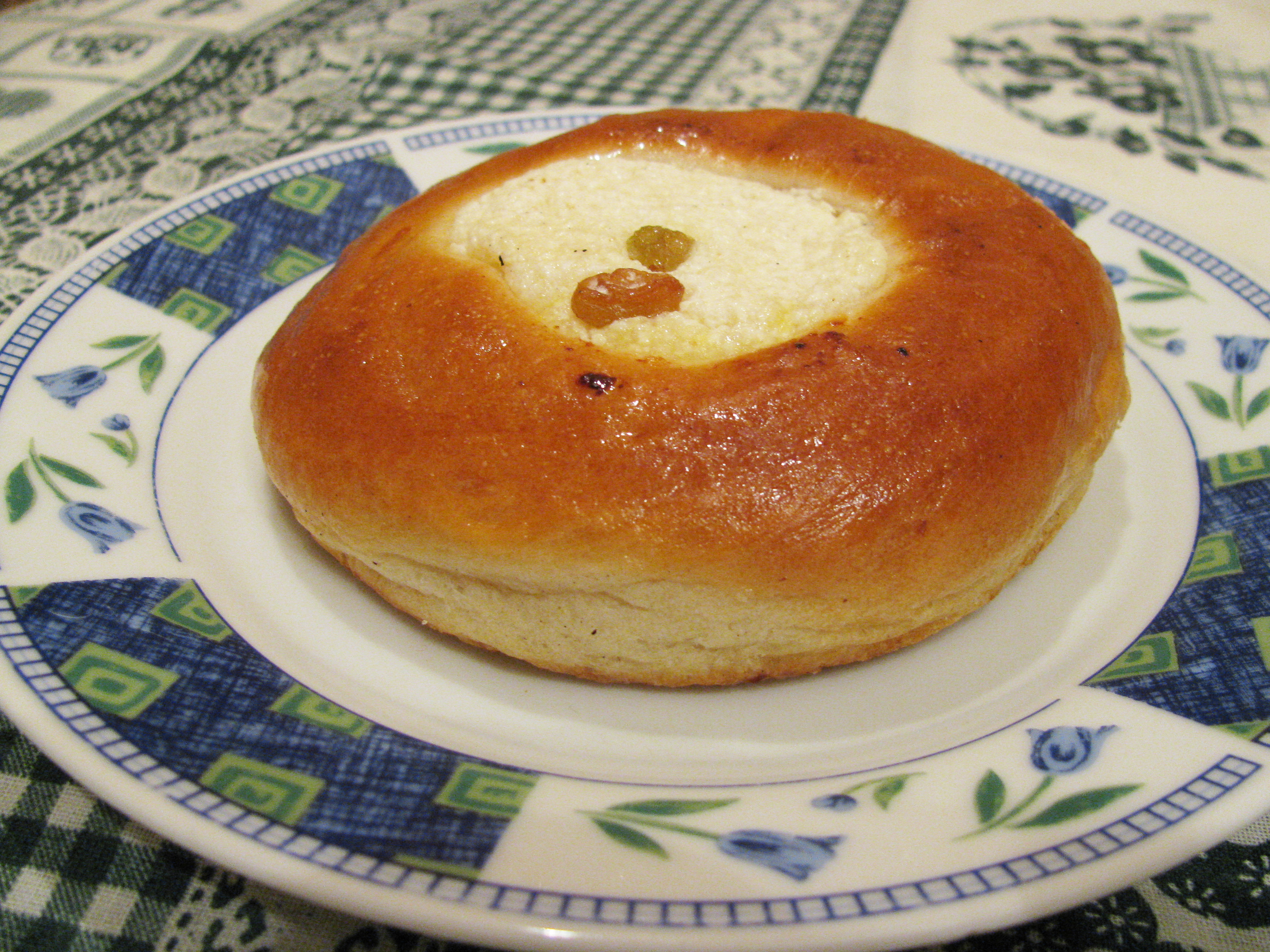
- Vatrushka with golden raisins
- Type: Pastry/pirog
- Place of origin: Eastern Europe
- Main ingredients: Dough, Tvorog
- Variations: with raisins or dried fruits

Vatrushka (Russian: ватрушка [vɐˈtruʂkə]) is an Eastern European pastry (pirog), characterized by a ring-shape of dough with traditional white cheese Tvorog in the middle, sometimes with the addition of raisins or bits of fruit. The most common size is about 5–10 cm (2–4 in) in diameter, but larger versions also exist. Vatrushkas are typically baked using a sweet yeast bread dough. Savoury varieties are made using unsweetened dough, with onion added to the filling.

The etymology of the word is uncertain. A widespread hypothesis derives the root of the name from the word vatra, which means "fire" in some Slavic languages. According to another version, the word is borrowed from the Romanian language, in which "vatra" means "a kind of cake, cooked in the fire". Alternative hypotheses traces it back to either the verb teret (тереть, "to rub" or "to grate") or to the term tvorog (творог).

== See also ==
- Karelian pasty
- Khachapuri
- Kolach
- List of Russian dishes
- Pirozhki
- Syrniki
- Vareniki
