= Coulibiac =

Russian fish pie

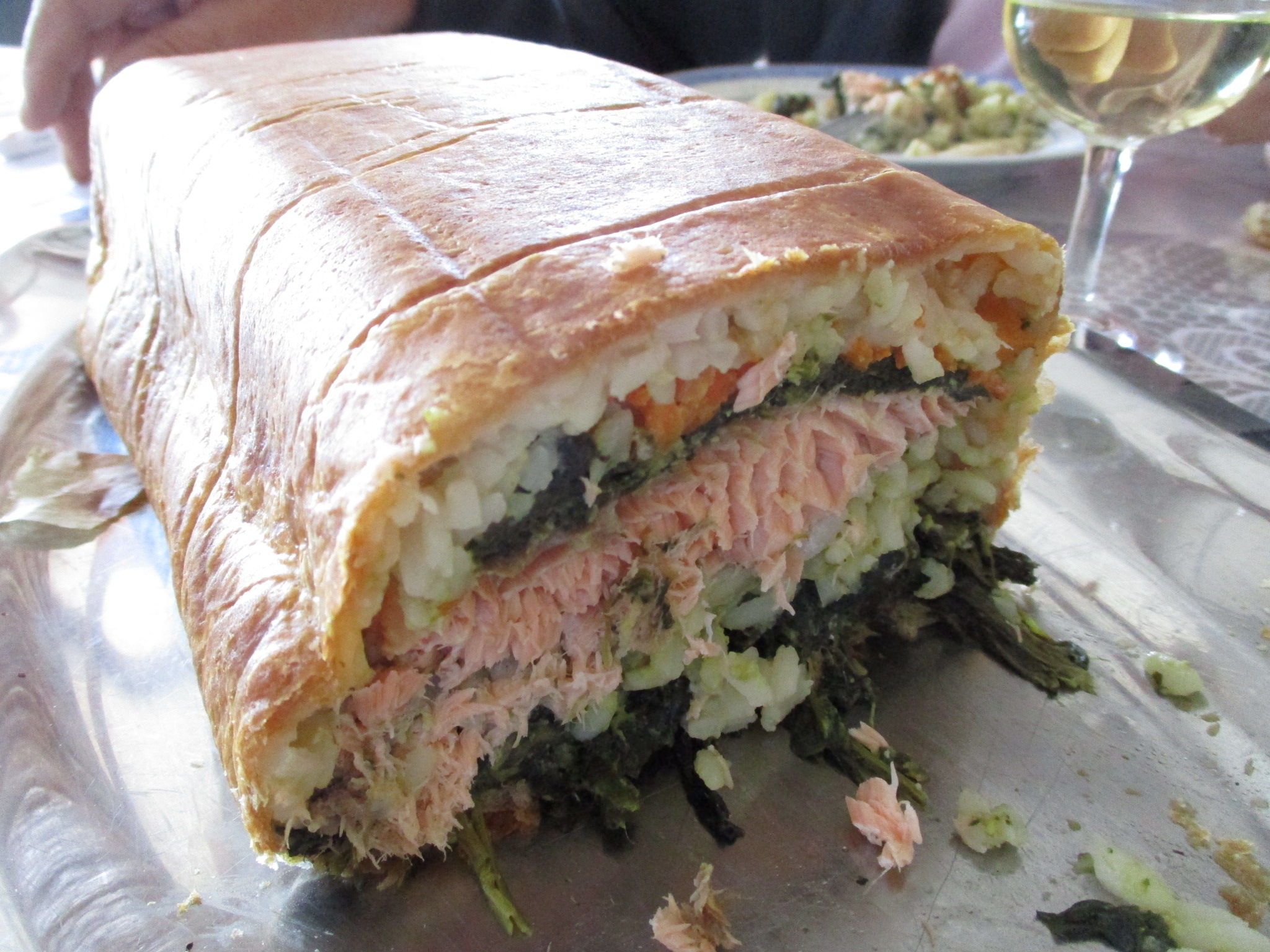
- Type: Pirog
- Place of origin: Russia
- Main ingredients: Salmon or sturgeon, rice or buckwheat, hard-boiled eggs, mushrooms, onions and dill

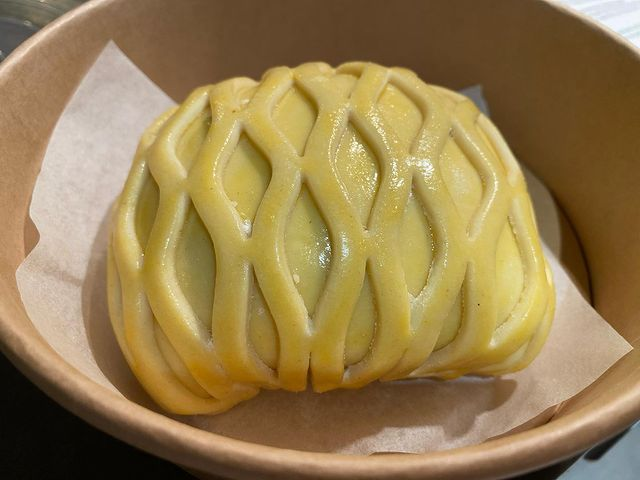
Uncooked salmon coulibiac

A coulibiac (Russian: кулебяка, romanized: kulebyaka [kʊlʲɪˈbʲakə]) is a type of pirog usually filled with salmon or sturgeon, rice or buckwheat, hard-boiled eggs, mushrooms, onions, and dill. The pie is baked in a pastry shell, usually of brioche or puff pastry.

In the early part of the 20th century, French chef Auguste Escoffier brought it to France and included recipes for it in his book The Complete Guide to the Art of Modern Cookery.

A classic grand coulibiac features several fillings, often a mixture of some white fish and rice for the top and bottom layers with fillets of sturgeon or salmon between. Generally the fillings are divided into thin pancakes to prevent mixing. The most unusual ingredient commonly included in the grand version of the dish is vesiga, the spinal marrow of the sturgeon.

Coulibiac is also made with simpler vegetarian fillings like cabbage or potatoes.

== See also ==
- List of Russian dishes
