= Russian Germans in North America =

Ethnic group

Russian Germans in North America are descended from the many ethnic Germans from Russia who immigrated to North America in the late 19th and early 20th centuries.

== Background ==
Russian Germans frequently lived in distinct communities and maintained German language schools and German churches. They were primarily Volga Germans from the lower Volga River valley; Black Sea Germans from the Crimean Peninsula/Black Sea region; or Volhynian Germans from the governorate of Volhynia in Ukraine. The smaller villages were often settled by colonists of a common religious denomination who had come from the same area and so a town is made up of German-speaking Catholics, Lutherans. The people often settled together from the same region of Germany and so spoke the same German dialect.

Originally recruited and welcomed to the Russian Empire in the 18th century, when they were promised to be allowed to practice their own language and religions and to be exempted from compulsory military service, the Germans from Russia found increasing hardship. With changes in politics, the Russian government took back some of the privileges that had been granted, economic conditions grew poor. Those conditions led to German mass migrations from Russia.

After the Bolshevik Revolution and the rise of the Soviet Union, particularly under the leadership of Joseph Stalin, conditions for the remaining Germans in Russia declined considerably. The subsequent rise of Nazi Germany, with its concern about ethnic Germans in other lands and proselytizing to the German Volk, led to suspicions of any Germans in Russia. In 1932 and 1933, the Soviet authorities forced starvation among the Volga Germans according to Western observers. Soviet authorities seized food supplies under the pretext of famine in the rest of the Soviet Union, and they ordered the breakup of many German villages.

After the German invasion of the Soviet Union, Stalin ordered the deportation of Russian Germans to labor camps in Siberia and Central Asia, as he was suspicious of potential collaboration with the invaders. In some areas, his forces attempted to bulldoze the German churches and reused their tombstones for paving blocks. Many Germans in the Americas sent donations back to their communities, but others permanently lost contact with their relatives during the social disruptions of the Ukrainian famine, Stalin's Great Purge, and World War II.

Unlike many other immigrants to the Americas during the late 19th and early 20th centuries, Germans from Russia wanted to continue farming and settled in agricultural areas, rather than industrial cities. Primary areas of settlement were in the Great Plains since it resembled the flat terrain of the Russian steppes. In addition, the upper Great Plains still had arable land available for free settlement under the Homestead Act.

Large-scale immigration to the Americas started in the 1870s and continued until the 1917 Revolution, when travel and emigration were stopped.

Since the reunification of Germany after the fall of the Berlin Wall and the declining conditions in Russia, many ethnic Germans still living in the lands of the former Soviet Union sought German repatriation.

== United States ==
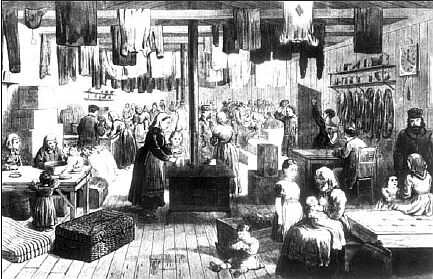
Temporary quarters for Volga Germans in central Kansas, 1875

The highest concentrations of Germans from Russia were mainly in the Great Plains. By 1910, North Dakota had the largest population of them, followed by Kansas, Colorado, South Dakota, Nebraska, and Oklahoma. Over time, many of them drifted further west into Montana, Oregon, Washington, and California. States in the Great Lakes region such as Illinois, Wisconsin, and Michigan had sizable populations of Germans from Russia as well.

By 1990, approximately one million descendants of Germans from Russia lived in the United States. Many of those descendants today often describe their ancestry as simply being German and have become a subgroup of German Americans. In the 2000 Census, North Dakota reported 43.9% of the population identified as having German ancestry. In 1910, 5% of the population of North Dakota had been born in Russia; it is likely that most were ethnic Germans.

In 2019, a crowdsourced survey was conducted by Sandy Schilling Payne that analyzed approximately 150 years of migration patterns within the United States. It was reported that California had the highest number of places where Germans from Russia and their descendants resided. Factors such as the Great Depression, the Dust Bowl, and World War II prompted many to relocate from hard-hit states in the Midwest to California.

=== Cities ===
Other Volga Germans made new lives in the industrializing American cities, especially in Chicago, which had an immense upsurge in immigration from Eastern Europe during that time. The largest area of concentrated settlement was in Jefferson Park, on the city's Northwest Side, mostly between 1907 and 1920. By 1930, 450 families of the Evangelical faith were living in that area, most of whom originated from Wiesenseite. Later, during the period of suburbanization, many of their descendants moved out to outlying areas such as Maywood and Melrose Park. Many families living in the Jefferson Park central business district along Lawrence and Milwaukee Avenues have Volga German immigrant ancestors.

A community of Volga Germans developed in Portland, mainly concentrated in Albina. Outsiders often described this area as "Little Russia" despite their ethnic German identity.

Another urban center that attracted numerous Volga German families was Denver, specifically the neighborhood of Globeville.

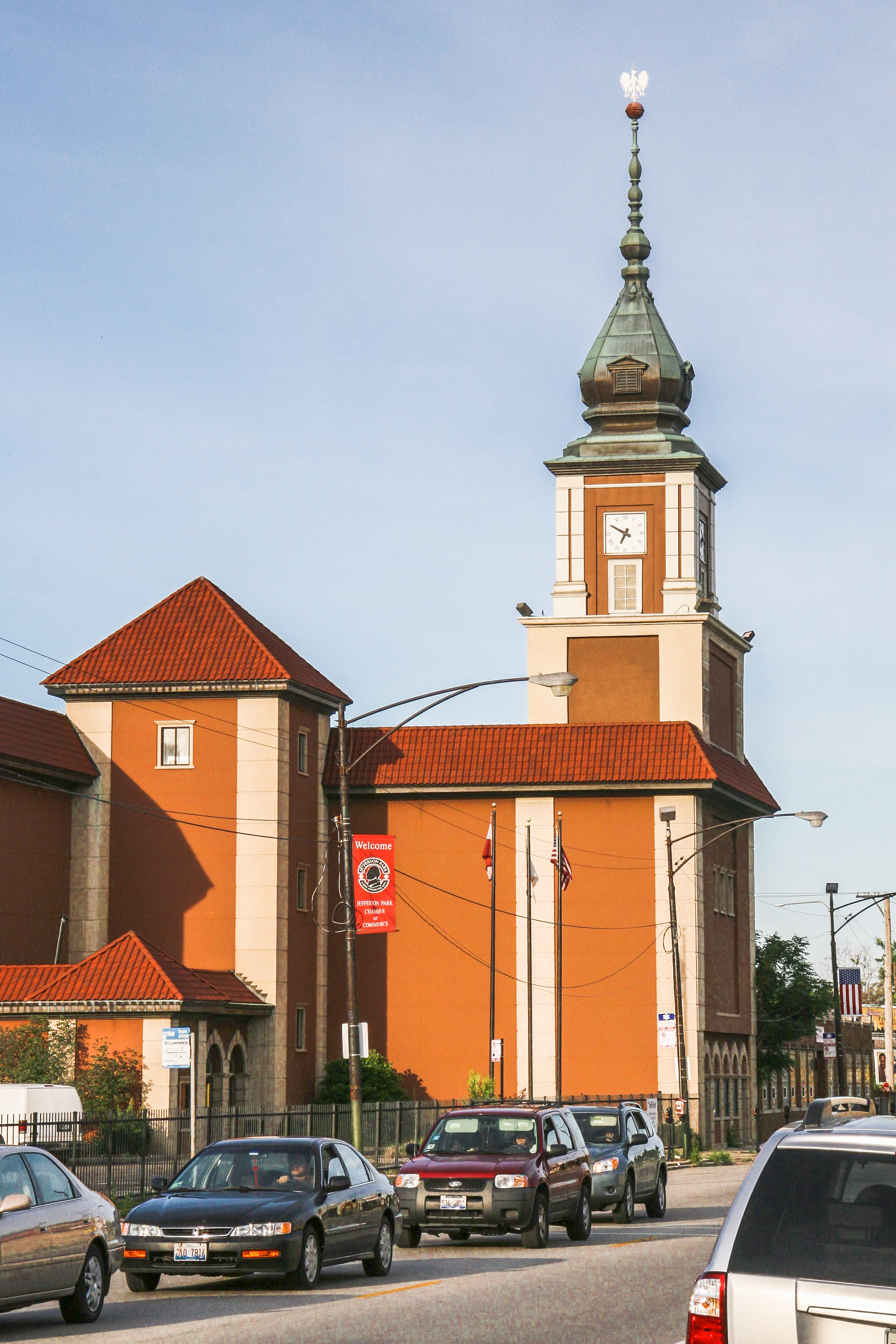
During the first two decades of the 20th century, the Chicago neighborhood of Jefferson Park was the point of initial settlement for many Volga German immigrants.

=== Agriculture ===
Volga Germans were heavily involved with the growing sugar beet industry in northern Colorado and western Nebraska. Most Black Sea Germans were affiliated with wheat production in the Dakotas.

Bernhard Warkentin, born in a small Russian village in 1847, travelled to America in his early twenties. Interested in flour mills, he was especially impressed with the wheat-growing possibilities in the United States. After he had visited Kansas, Warkentin found the Great Plains much like those that he had left behind. Settling in Harvey County, Kansas, he built a water mill on the banks of the Little Arkansas River, the Halstead Milling and Elevator Company. Warkentin's greatest contribution to Kansas was the introduction of hard turkey wheat into Kansas, which replaced the soft variety grown exclusively in the state.

=== Culture ===
Negatively influenced by the violation of their rights and cultural persecution by the tsar, the Russian Germans who settled in the northern Midwest saw themselves as an ethnic group that was separate from Russian Americans and had an entirely different experience from the German Americans who had immigrated from German lands. The Germans from Russia settled in tight-knit communities, which retained their German language and culture. They raised large families, built German-style churches, buried their dead in distinctive cemeteries by using wrought iron grave markers, and created choir groups that sang German church hymns. During World War I, their identity was challenged by anti-German sentiment.

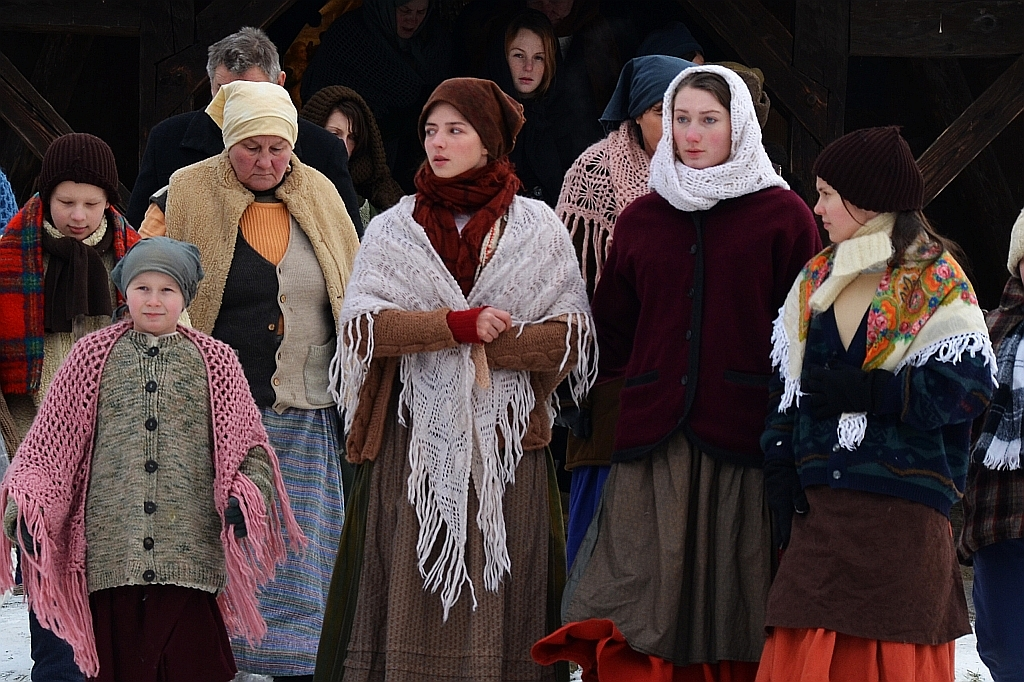
Actors from Germany in film "Als der Tod ins Leben wuchs" of Sebastian Ed Erhenberg as Volga Germans, Sanok 2013

During the 1970s, Kenneth Rock, a professor of history at Colorado State University, collected 60 oral histories of Russian German immigrants and their descendants as part of the "Germans from Russia in Colorado" Study Project. He documented life in the ethnic German communities in Russia, the immigration experience, work and social life in the United States, and interaction between the Russian-German communities and the wider society in both Russia and the United States.

== Canada ==
=== Background ===
In addition to the large population of Germans from Russia that settled on the American prairie, many also settled in the Canadian West. In the early 1870s, the Canadian government had begun to create promotional programs in Europe to entice settlers to the largely-unsettled western areas in what would become Alberta, Saskatchewan, Manitoba, and British Columbia. Public policy also served to attract immigration following the passage of the federal Dominion Lands Act of 1872, which provided free grants of homesteads to those who settled on the Canadian prairie. In the early 20th century, many immigrants moved from the United States to Canada in search of inexpensive land and greater social autonomy. Those German-American immigrants brought not only their experience working on the American plains but also their accrued wealth, which boosted the economy of western Canada.

=== 1875–1918 ===
The Germans from Russia who flocked to Canada in the late 19th and early 20th centuries came from different religious backgrounds, including Lutheran, Catholic, and Mennonite. The last group, named after the founder Menno Simons, was the largest portion of the immigrant population. Those Mennonites were Plautdietsch-speaking people of Dutch descent who in Russia had been the best organized by preparing scouting parties to investigate the prospect of immigration to Canada and the United States. The scouts had been reliant on the assistance of established Mennonite groups such as those found in Lancaster County, Pennsylvania, and in Ontario. From 1873 to 1879, Mennonites formed block settlements in Manitoba such as the East Reserve and West Reserve, with a total of close to 7,000 members. Most settled in southern Manitoba in the richest part of the Red River Valley. The communities were centered around religious homogeneity, the insistence on the tenets of adult baptism, and the refusal to bear arms or to swear an oath. Many Mennonites had been propelled to leave because of the introduction of extended conscription, which had been put into place in 1874 and was set to take effect in Russia in 1881.

Many Germans from Russia emigrated from the United States to Western Canada from 1890 to 1909. They sought to escape rising land prices and the imposition of laws that had begun to encroach on their relative autonomy. Canada was seen as a new frontier and a place of vast land but little settlement. The immigrants settled mainly in the colonies of St. Peter and St. Joseph, East and West of Saskatoon, in central Saskatchewan. In the 1890s, twelve Catholic families established Rastadt-Dorf, and another twenty-one settled Katherinetal. Additional settlements were begun in Davin, Kronau, and Speyer.

=== Interwar period ===
During the interwar period, conditions in Russia worsened, especially after the Revolution and the Great Famine of 1921. Many ethnic Germans sought to leave the Soviet Union but faced opposition from a government that did not wish to see such a large portion of its population leave. The government imposed a fee for obtaining a passport, which led to protests as many would-be immigrants flooded the streets of Moscow. Many Mennonites were eventually able to leave, and between the World Wars, over 20,000 of them left destined for Canada.

From the 1910s to several years after the end of the Second World War, the ethnic background of the Germans made them prey to discrimination in Canada. By 1914, Germany had become Canada's enemy, and the Germans from Russia were not immune from suspicion, even though many families had not lived in Germany for hundreds of years. This period saw the suppression of many German cultural customs, including the suppression of their print media and the closure of German schools. The federal Wartime Elections Act, passed in September 1917, revoked the citizenship of any German naturalized after March 1902. Many settlements were renamed to disguise their obvious German origin.

The 1920s also saw the movement of Germans from Russia within Western Canada as well. Many pushed further west and settled in British Columbia. The area had the appeal of a warmer climate, an escape from the frigid prairie. Other Germans were propelled by economic factors such as the Great Depression, which not only impoverished many but also coincided with a tremendous drought ushering in crop failures. The economy of the Prairies and much of the rest of Canada was dependent on the success of wheat farming. Wheat had been a staple crop for the Germans in Russia and adapted well to the climate of Western Canada. Repeated crop failures meant a large influx of German-Russians to larger cities and towns, which would contribute to the gradual decline of their culturally homogeneous communities. The prairie lands abutting the United States border experienced Dust Bowl conditions, which sent swarms of families to the coastal areas of British Columbia. Throughout the period after World War II, new immigrants joined their families in British Columbia and congregated in the Fraser Valley and Vancouver Island.

=== Legacy ===
Throughout their history in Western Canada, the Germans from Russia have maintained many of their cultural characteristics, including their dialects, which have been proliferated through Saturday schools and Canadian policies that allowed for cultural freedom. Those schools operated on Saturday mornings for around three hours and became especially vital as German stopped being taught in Canadian public schools after World War I. The Mennonites, unlike most Volga Germans, maintained those schools even after World War II. The Volga Germans' dialects was also maintained by the churches, especially for Mennonite.

Before the Germans from Russia left for North America, they had been regarded as privileged colonists in Russia. When they arrived in the United States and Canada, they found that they were treated the same as any other migrant group from Eastern Europe. The Mennonites may be seen as an exception since they successfully used connections with their brethren in Lancaster County, Pennsylvania, and in Ontario.

== Language ==
The Germans from Russia originally spoke German dialects such as the Palatine dialect or Mennonite Low German (Plautdietsch) at home. Since the villages in Russia often were populated by settlers from a particular region and isolated from Germany, they maintained their regional dialects. Depending on their specific dialect, some Germans from Russia had difficulties understanding Standard German, which can differ greatly from the dialects.

After emigrating from Russia to the Americas, the Germans kept speaking their dialects. As a result of anti-German sentiment that developed over the course of both world wars, English became the dominant language among many of them. However, descendants of Germans from Russia who choose to stay in touch with their heritage often learn Standard German, especially since the modern Hochdeutsch that stems from Martin Luther's translation of the Bible had already been the standard written form of the language. Today, German is preserved mainly through singing groups, recipes, and educational settings.

== Notable descendants of Germans from Russia ==
- Philip Anschutz, businessman
- Craig Bohl, football coach
- Tom Daschle, former U.S. Senate Majority Leader
- John Denver (Henry John Deutschendorf, Jr.), singer
- Paul Revere Dick, Paul Revere and the Raiders
- Angie Dickinson, actress
- Joe Exotic, felonious zookeeper
- Phyllis Frelich, Tony winning actress
- Johnny Hopp, baseball player
- Chris Isaak, singer-songwriter
- Randy Meisner, musician and former band member of the Eagles
- Brian Schweitzer, former Governor of Montana
- Brian Urlacher, former American football player
- Lawrence Welk, band leader
- Carson Wentz, football player

== See also ==
- Vistula Germans
- Der Staats Anzeiger
- History of Saskatchewan
- Russian Mennonites
- Hutterites
