= Rasstegai =

Russian pastry

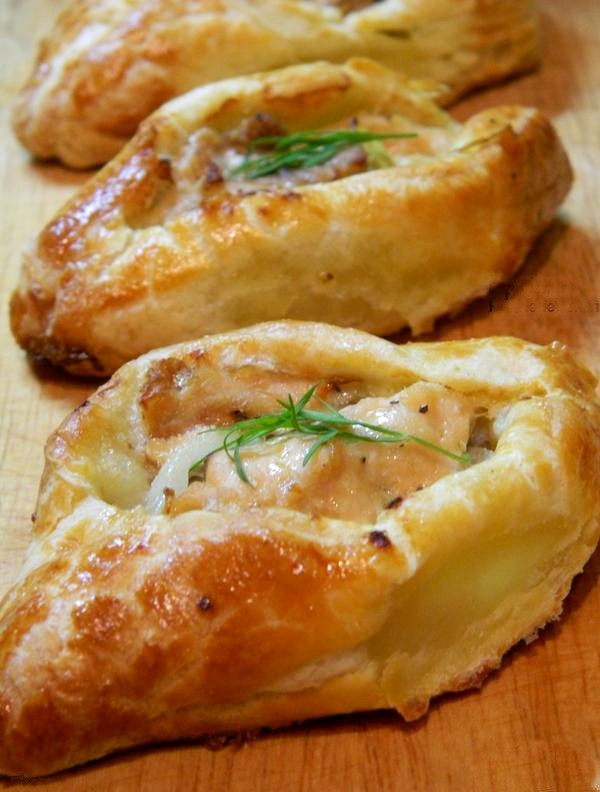
- Type: Pirog
- Place of origin: Russia

Rasstegai (Russian: расстегай) is a type of Russian pirog with a hole in the top.

== History and etymology ==
The dish was very popular in Tsarist Russia. In rasstegai the filling is not hidden in the dough, and rasstegai in Russian means "unfastened" pies.

Another version: in Moscow, in the gypsy choir, the beautiful Katya sang very well the Russian song "Sarafanchik-rasstegaychik"; in honor of Katya, rasstegai became a very popular meal in taverns in Moscow.

== Fillings ==
The filling usually contains fish, but may also contain meat, liver, rice or mushrooms. The hole of rasstegai is used to add broth to the stuffing.

== In literature ==
The dish is mentioned in Nikolai Gogol's Dead Souls and Vladimir Gilyarovsky's Moscow and the Muscovites.
