= Aush jushpare =

Type of Iranian soup

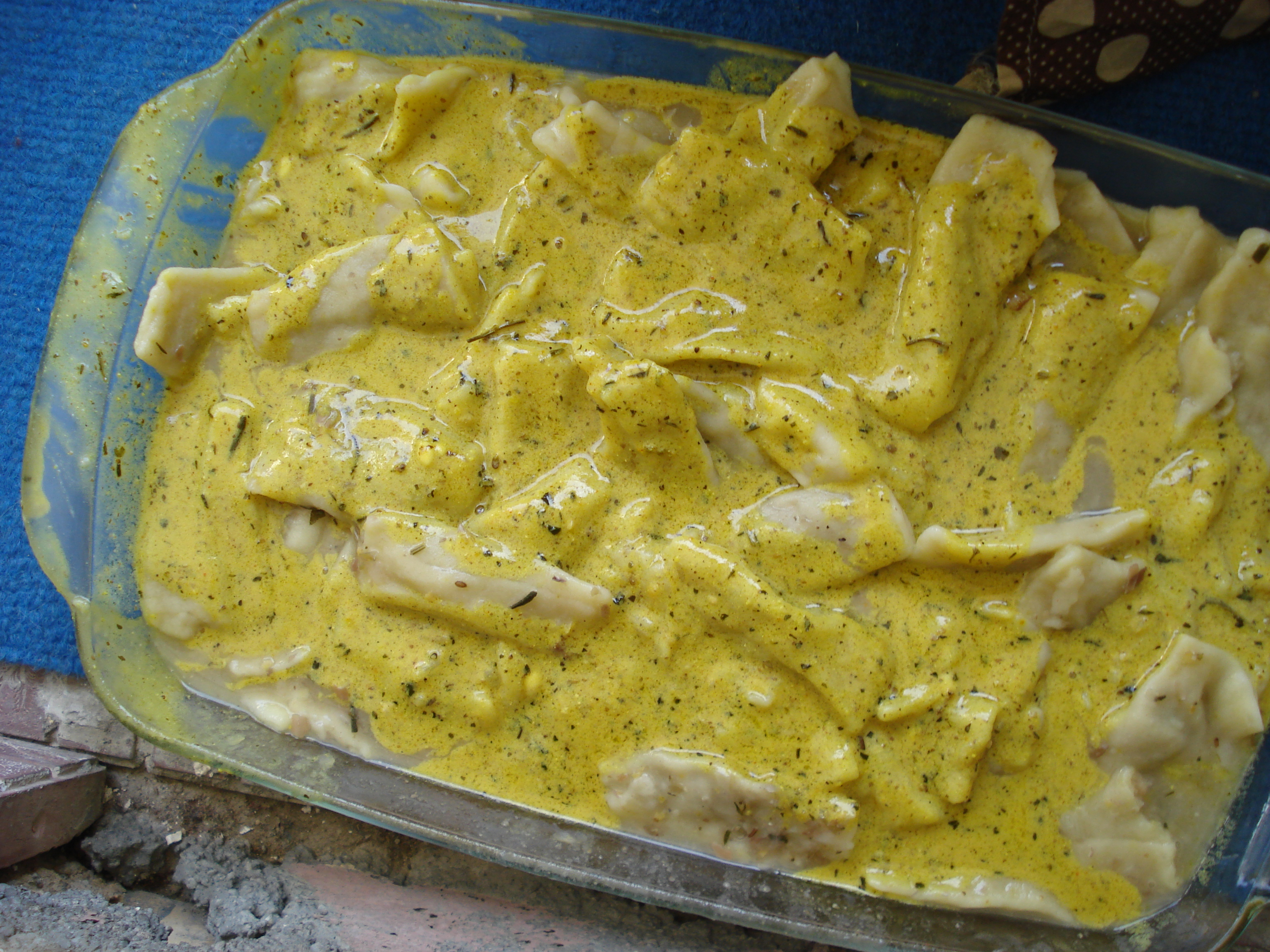
- Ash jushpare
- Alternative names: Āsh, aash
- Type: Soup
- Place of origin: Khorasan
- Region or state: Iran
- Serving temperature: hot
- Main ingredients: vegetables, broth, chaka
- Variations: ash-e anar (pomegranate stew), ash-e-jo (barley stew), ash-e doogh (yogurt soup), ash-e sak (spinach stew)

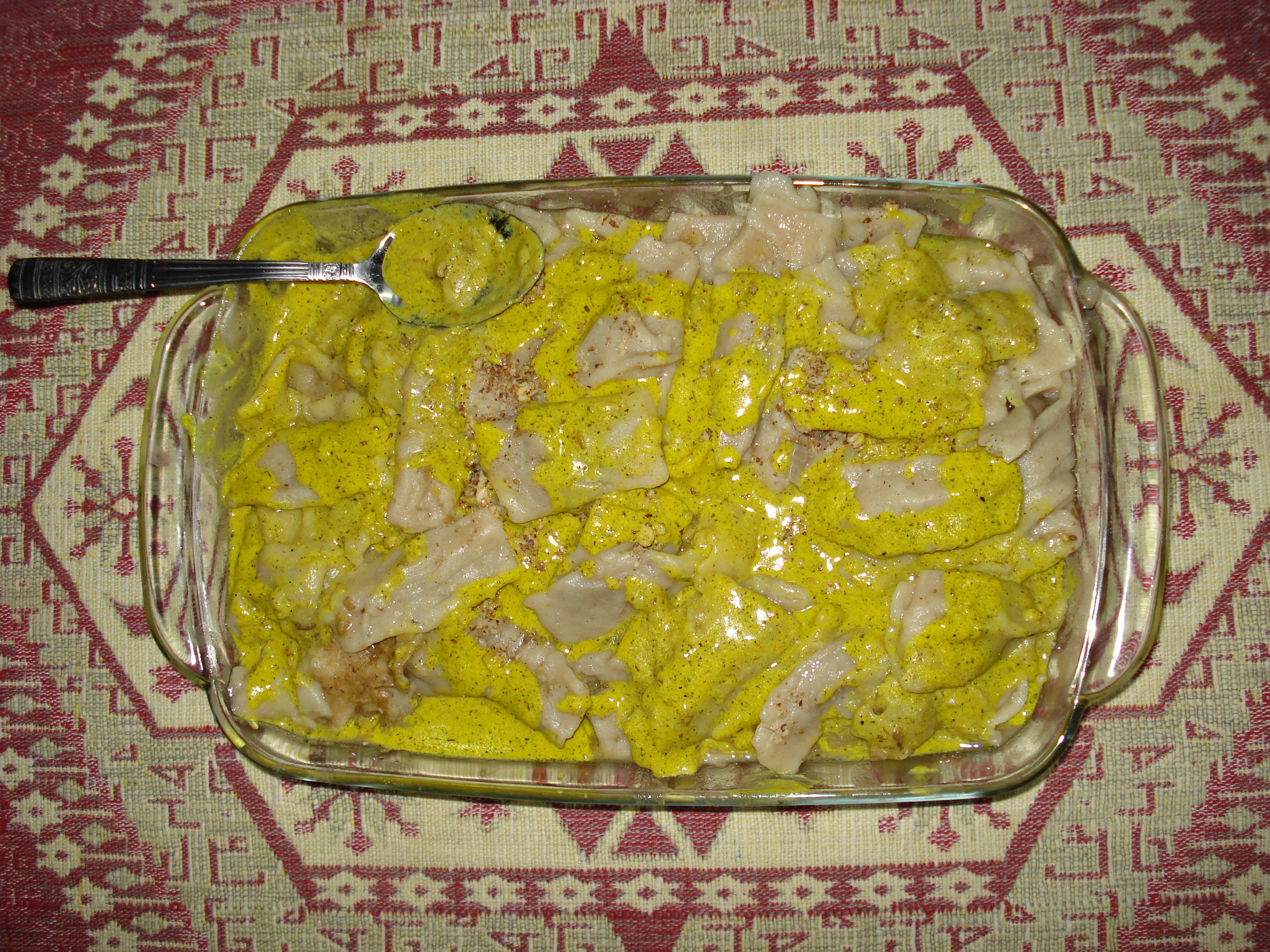
Aush jushpare

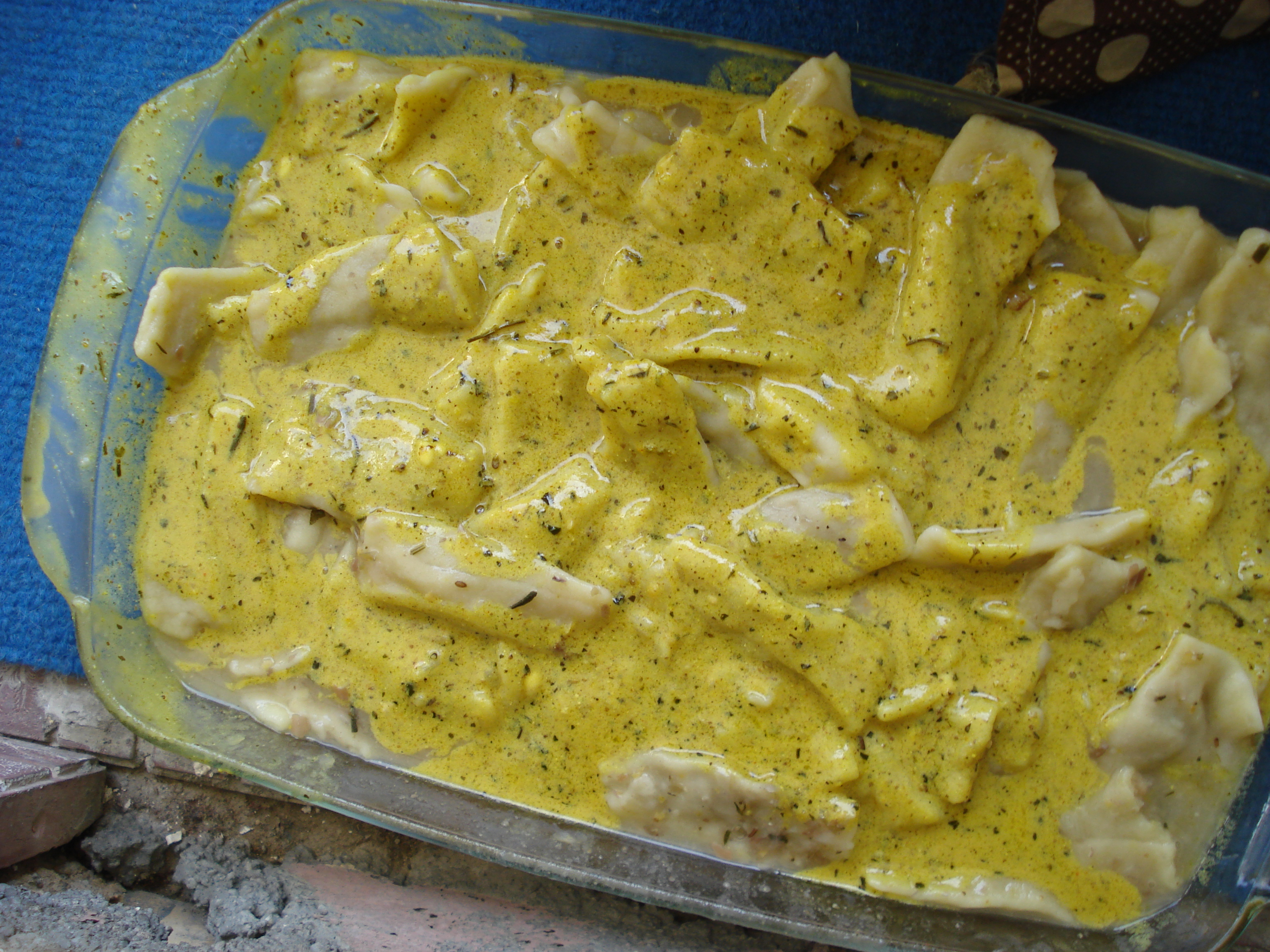
Aush jushpare

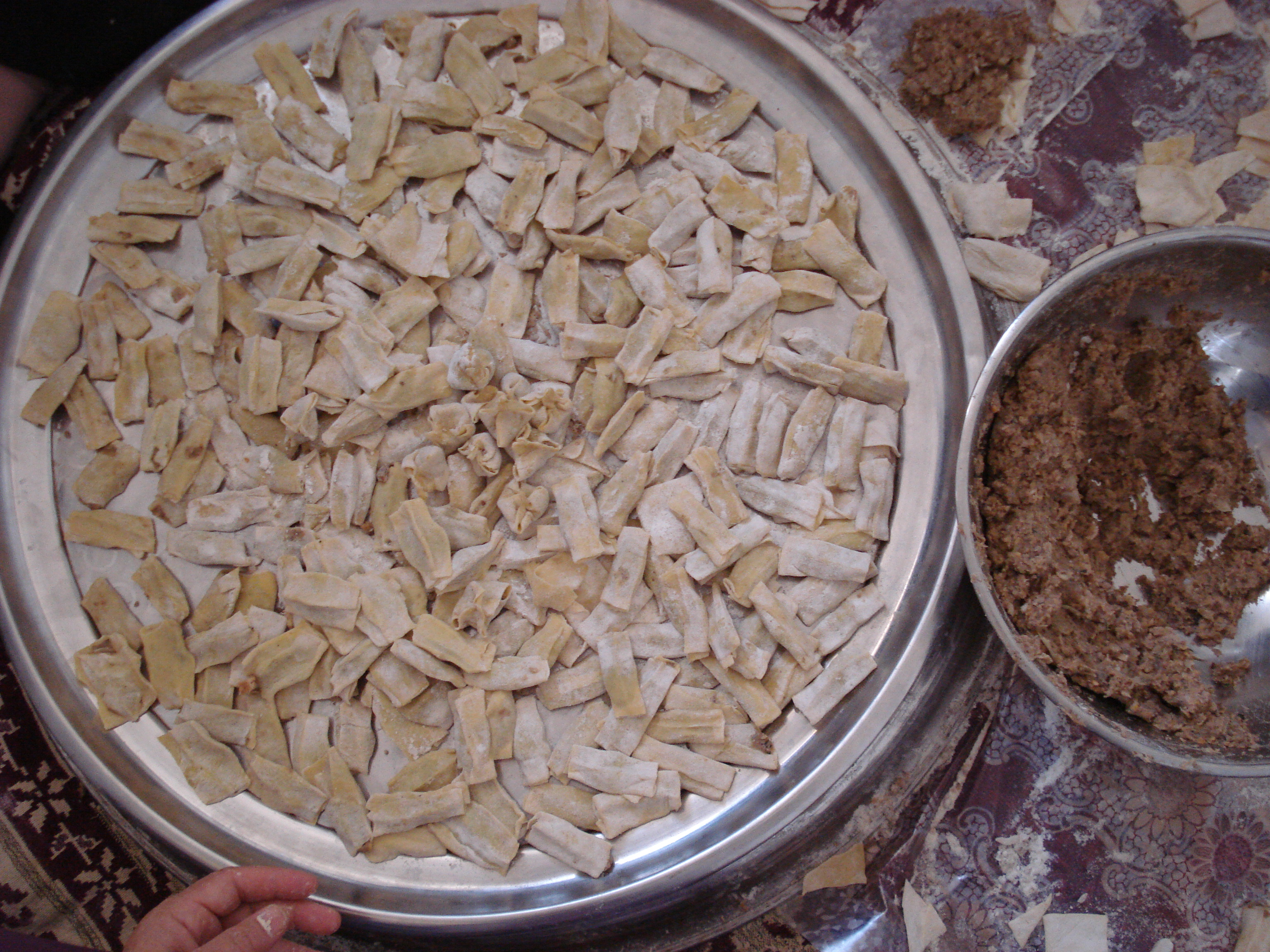
Jushpare（samosa）

Aush jushpare (آش جوش پَره) is a type of aush (Iranian thick soup or stew), commonly cooked in Khorasan, Gonabad, Ferdous and Sabzevar in Iran. It is similar to the Chinese jiaozi. Historian Bayhaqi (-1077) mentioned aush jushpare in his book Tarikh-i Bayhaqi. Aush jushpare is one of the oldest aush, but since it takes a lot of time for preparation, it is not commonly eaten now. It is rather a dish of hospitality, which people eat on the occasion of special gatherings or festivals. Traditional guest house restaurants serve aush jushpare as a local specialty. Aush jushpare was registered as intangible heritage of Iran on 5 January 2021.

== Ingredients ==
Aush is typically made with a variation of ingredients but may include; flat wheat noodles, turmeric, vegetables (broccoli, carrots, onion, celery, spinach, garlic, jalapeño), legumes (chickpeas, kidney beans), herbs (dill, mint, coriander, minced cilantro), yogurt and ground lamb, beef or chicken.

As a dish prepared at home, each family has its own preferred method of making them, using favorite fillings, with types and methods of preparation varying from city to city. Usually in Gonabad people do not add meat to the aush but some add the dumpling meat fillings include, mutton, beef, chicken, which are usually mixed with chopped beans, peas and onions. Some families add other popular vegetable fillings like napa cabbage, scallion (spring onions), leek, celery, spinach, mushroom, edible black fungus, carrot, and garlic chives, but the main ingredients for jushpare are beans, peas and onions.

== How to cook aush jushpare ==
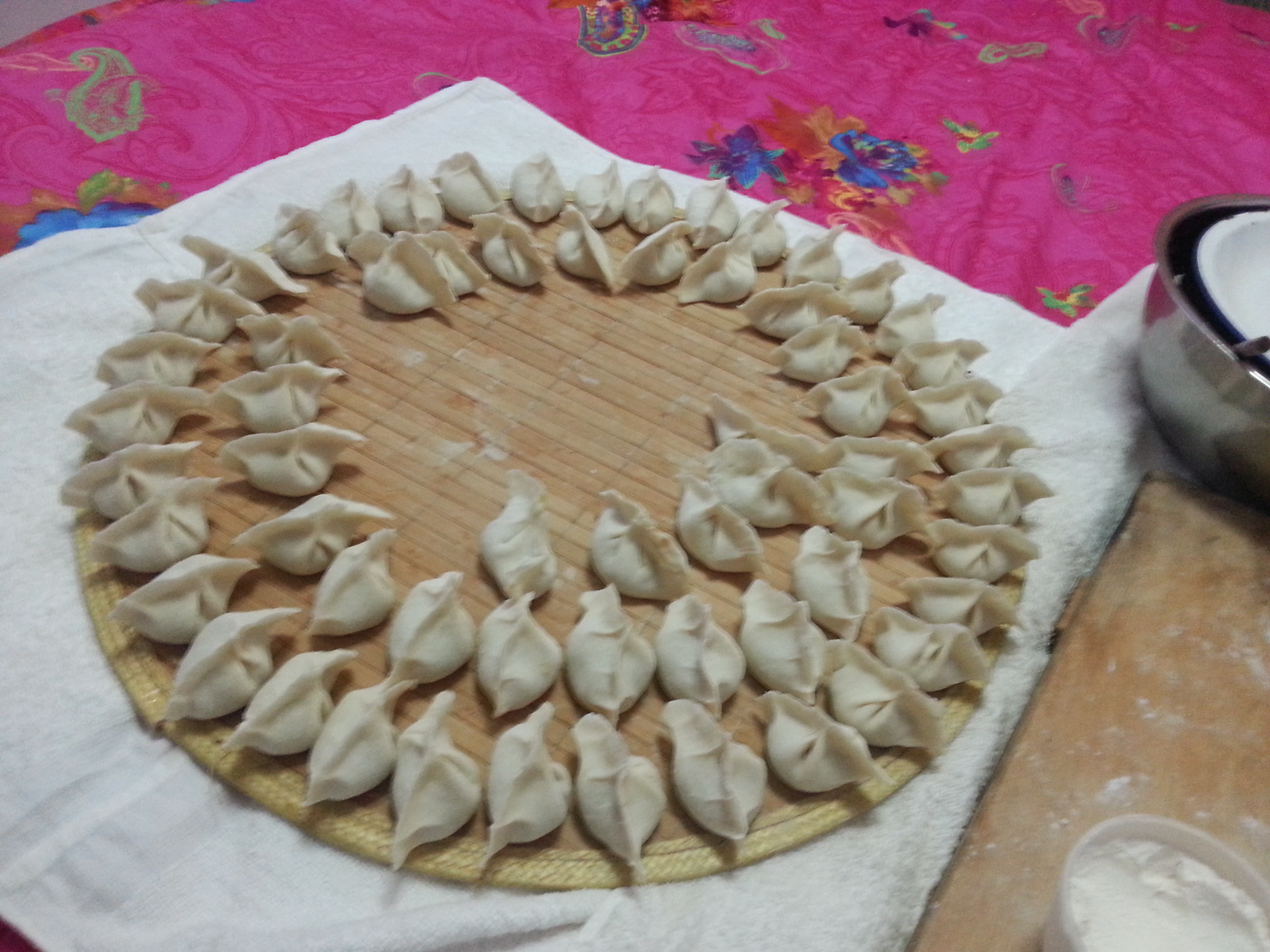
Jushpare

Leaf shape for jushpare and naan.

First, knead flour with water to make a dough. Broaden a small piece of the dough to make a thin leaf shape, and put chopped stir-fried onions, pre-cooked lentils, peas, and spices. Wrap it into the shape of triangle or quadrangle so that it does not open. This is called jushpare (similar to samosa, dumplings or ravioli). Then put the jushpare into boiling water, simmer it well, (about 35 minutes), and it is ready to eat. Before eating, add a little powdered kashk (dried fermented milk).

In recent days, pre-boiled jushpare or aush is available in stores. Also, some people fry jushpare in oil.

== Aush in Iranian cuisine ==
There are more than 50 types of thick soup (aush or aash) in Iranian cooking, ash reshteh being one of the more popular types. Some other well known āsh include ash-e anar (pomegranate stew), ash-e-jo (barley stew), ash-e doogh, ash-e sak (spinach stew), ash-e torsh (beet/pickle stew). The Iranian variation of aush often is topped with a garnish (na’na dagh) of fried mint oil, garlic chips, and/or shallot chips.

Depending on the type of aush, it could contain different types of grain, legumes (chick peas, black-eye beans, lentils), vegetables, tomato, turnips (Aush-e-Shalqham), herbs (parsley, spinach, dill, spring onion ends, coriander, dried mint), onions, oil, meat, garlic, reshteh (in Ash Reshteh) and spices, such as salt, pepper, turmeric, saffron, etc.

Aush can be considered a full meal or a first course. Aush can often be bought in Persian stores canned, as dried mixes or frozen.

Since Aush is a very basic food in Iran, it became the etymology of words related to cooking. The word "cook" is "AushPaz" in Persian which is combination of "Aush" and "Paz", and literally means "a person who cooks Aush". Also the word "kitchen" is "AushPaz Khaneh": the combination of "AushPaz" and "Khaneh" which means house.

== See also ==
- Ash-e anar
- Ash reshteh
- Kalehjoosh
- List of soups
- Iranian cuisine
- Iraqi cuisine
