= Al-Khwarizmi (disambiguation) =

Al-Khwarizmi or Muḥammad ibn Mūsā al-Khwārizmī (c. 780 – c. 850) was a Persian scholar who produced works in mathematics, astronomy, and geography.

Al-Khwarizmi may also refer to:

== People ==
- Muhammad ibn Ahmad al-Khwarizmi, 10th-century encyclopedist who wrote Mafātīḥ al-ʿulūm ("Key to the Sciences")
- Abū Bakr Muḥammad b. al-ʿAbbās al-Khwarizmi, Arabic poet and writer (934-93)
- Al-Khwarizmi al-Khati, 11th-century alchemist
- Shuja al-Khwarazmi (d. 861) was the mother of Abbasid caliph Ja'far al-Mutawakkil

== Places ==
- Al-Khwarizmi (crater), a crater on the far-side of the Moon named after Muhammad ibn Musa al-Khwarizmi
- Khwarizmi International Award, a research award for achievements in science and technology research

== See also ==
- Khwarezmian (disambiguation)
