= Guotie =

Guotie could refer to:

- Guotie (Chinese: 锅贴, pinyin: guōtiē), a northern Chinese style dumpling
- China Railway (Chinese: 国铁, pinyin: guótiě)
