= Khorasan (disambiguation) =

Khorasan is a historical region of Central Asia, now in modern-day northeastern Iran, southern Turkmenistan and northern Afghanistan, sometimes used in a looser sense to include parts of Tajikistan and Uzbekistan.

Khorasan may also refer to:

- The northeastern area of Iran, until 2004 comprising Khorasan Province, subsequently divided into:
  - South Khorasan Province
  - North Khorasan Province
  - Razavi Khorasan Province
- Khorasan, Kurdistan, a village in Kurdistan Province, Iran
- Khorosan, an alternate name of Sain Qaleh, a city in Zanjan Province, Iran
- Khuroson District, a district in Khatlon province of Tajikistan
- Horasan, a town and district of Erzurum Province of Turkey
- Khorasan wheat, a wheat variety
- Khorasan group, a group of senior al-Qaeda members who reportedly operate in Syria
- Khorasan (newspaper), an Iranian newspaper
- Islamic State – Khorasan Province, a branch of ISIS that operates in Pakistan and Afghanistan

== See also ==
- Khorasani (disambiguation)
- Khwarazm or Chorasmia, an oasis region south of the Aral Sea
- Khwarazmian (disambiguation)
