= Aush reshteh =

Type of Iranian thick soup

Ash reshteh
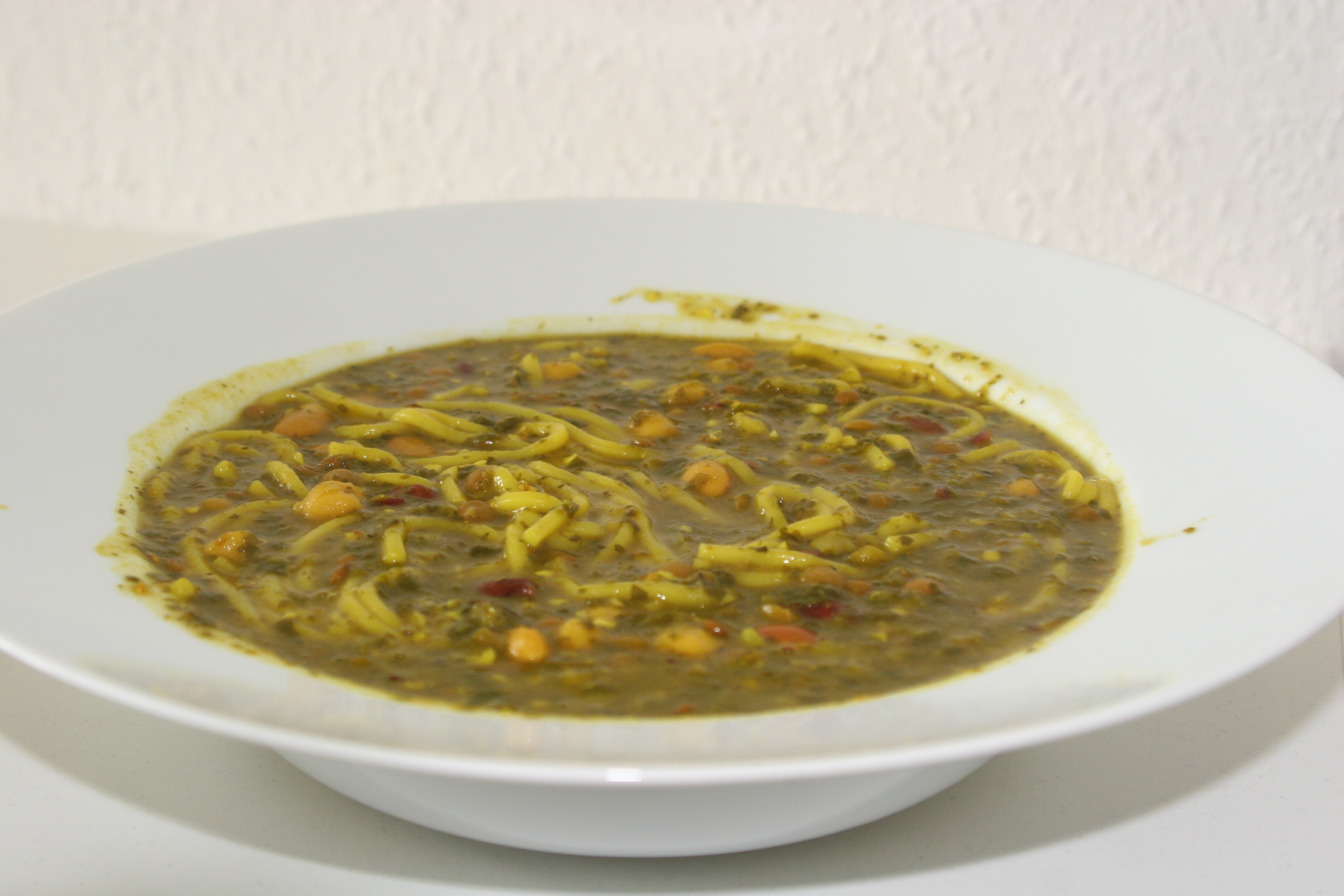
- Aush reshteh, an Iranian thick soup (pottage), mainly consisting of herbs, beans, and noodles
- Alternative names: آش رشته, ash reshteh, ash-e-reshteh, aashe reshteh, ash e-reshteh, āsh e reshteh, aash-e-reshteh-e
- Type: Thick soup (pottage)
- Course: First or main (optional)
- Place of origin: Iran
- Region or state: Iran
- Created by: Iranians
- Main ingredients: Herbs, kidney beans, lentils, water, noodles and turmeric
- Variations: Pinto beans instead of kidney beans
- Other information: Vegan if served without kashk

Aush reshteh or ash-e-reshteh (Persian: آش رشته) is a type of āsh (Iranian thick soup) featuring reshteh (thin noodles), kidney beans, chickpeas, lentils, herbs, and kashk (a sour dairy product made from cooked or dried yogurt), commonly made in Iran. Hot fried garlic, onion, or mint are used as garnishes.

== Varieties ==
There are more than 50 types of thick soup (ash) in Iranian cooking, this being one of the more common types. The ingredients used are reshteh (thin noodles), kashk (a whey-like, fermented dairy product), herbs such as parsley, spinach, dill, spring onion ends and sometimes coriander, chickpeas, black-eye beans, lentils, onions, flour, dried mint, garlic, oil, salt, and black pepper. Common garnishes include fried onion and fried garlic. Aush reshteh is traditionally vegetarian but can easily be made vegan by omitting the kashk; alternatively, meat can be added.

== History ==
Ash reshteh has its origins in the distant past. By 500 A.D., noodles were added to the dish.

It is cooked most often in autumn and winter. Traditionally, aush reshteh is served at special Iranian events like Nowruz or Sizdah Be-dar, or during wintertime. The noodles are supposed to symbolize good fortune for the new year.

== See also ==
- Ash-e-anar
- List of soups
