= Kalehjoosh =

Soup of Iran, Armenia, Azerbaijan, and Turkey

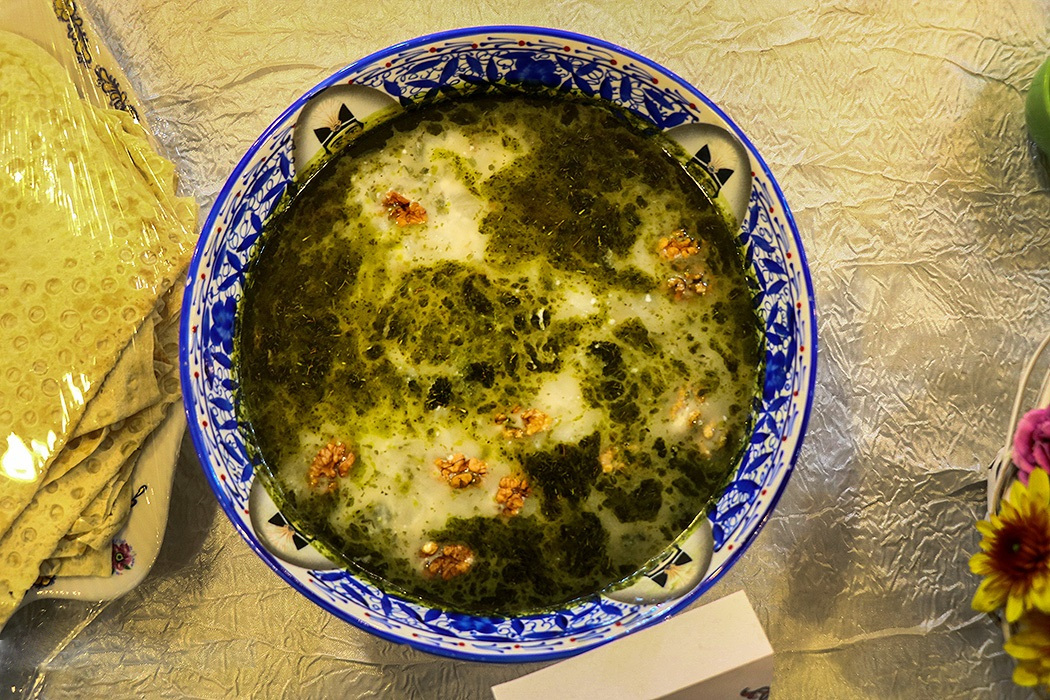
- Alternative names: Կալջոշ (Armenian), Keledoş (Turkish), Kələcoş (Azeri Turkic), Kalejoosh (Persian)
- Type: Soup, Aush
- Course: Main dish, side dish
- Place of origin: Armenia
- Region or state: Middle East, Caucasus

Kalehjoosh (Persian: کاله‌جوش), or Kyalagyosh (Armenian: քյալագյոշ) is a popular traditional soup in Iran, Armenia, Azerbaijan (Azerbaijani: Kələcoş), and Turkey (Turkish: Keledoş, Kelecoş, or Kelecaşı).

It is believed to be of Armenian origin due to Its etymology.

== Etymology ==
According to Sevan Nişanyan, the name comes from the Armenian term կալաճաշ, galajash, in which կալ, gal, means blend, and ճաշ, jash, means food, thus blend food.

== Regional recipes ==
In Armenia, kyalagyosh is a matzoon-based soup served over toasted pieces of lavash. The soup is prepared with eggs, flour, onions, walnuts, butter, matzoon, sour cream, thyme, mint, coriander, black pepper and other spices. When it is finished, it is often topped with aleppo pepper, or another spice-flavored melted butter. Other common versions also add meat, or sometimes lentils to the soup.

In Iran, kalehjoosh has different regional recipes and cooking styles in Isfahan, Yazd, and Khorasan. Iranian kalehjoosh recipes may include meat (optional), kashk, yogurt, dried fenugreek, dried mint, roasted onions, walnuts.

In Turkey, the recipe may include chickpeas, lentils, white beet and meat, all of which are cooked separately. Onion is added to the meat, and then they add everything to broth and set it to simmer. The kashk is added in last. The Turkish variety includes topping the soup with butter and red pepper sauce.

== See also ==
- List of soups
- Iranian cuisine
