= Khorasani =

Khorasani (Persian: خراسانى) may refer to:

== Linguistics ==
- Kurmanji language, a dialect of Kurdish
- Khorasani Turkic
- Khorasani Arabic

== People ==
- Abu Muslim Khorasani
- Mohammad-Kazem Khorasani
- Noushin Ahmadi Khorasani
- Mohammad Va'ez Abaee-Khorasani
- Sultan Ali Khorasani
- Hossein Waheed Khorasani
- Abdul Hamid Khorasani

== Places ==
- Khorasani, Fars, a village in Fars Province, Iran

== See also ==
- Khorasan (disambiguation)
- Greater Khorasan
- Khorasan Province
- Khorasani style, a medieval architectural style
- Khorasani style (poetry), a medieval Persian poetic style
