= Khwarazmian =

The name Khwarazmian (also Khwarezmian, Khwarizmim, Khorezmian, Chorasmian, Carizmian, and others) may refer to:

== Places and peoples ==
- Khwarazm, a large oasis region on the Amu Darya river delta in western Central Asia
  - Khwarazmshah, the title of various rulers of Khwarazm from four different dynasties
- Khwarazmian Empire, a Turko-Persian Sunni Muslim empire that ruled large parts of present-day Central Asia, Afghanistan, and Iran from about 1077 to 1231
  - Khwarazmian dynasty, its ruling dynasty of Khwarazmshahs
  - Khwarazmian army between 1231 and 1246, which sacked Jerusalem in 1244

== Languages and scripts ==
- Khwarezmian language (6th century BCE – 13th century CE), an extinct East Iranian language
  - Chorasmian (script), script used in writing the (Iranian) Khwarazmian language
  - Chorasmian (Unicode block), the Unicode block containing the script
- Khorezmian Turkic (13th–14th century), an extinct Turkic language

== See also ==
- Al-Khwārizmī (disambiguation)
- Khorasan (disambiguation)
