= Aush =

Variety of thick soups from Iranian and Afghan cuisines

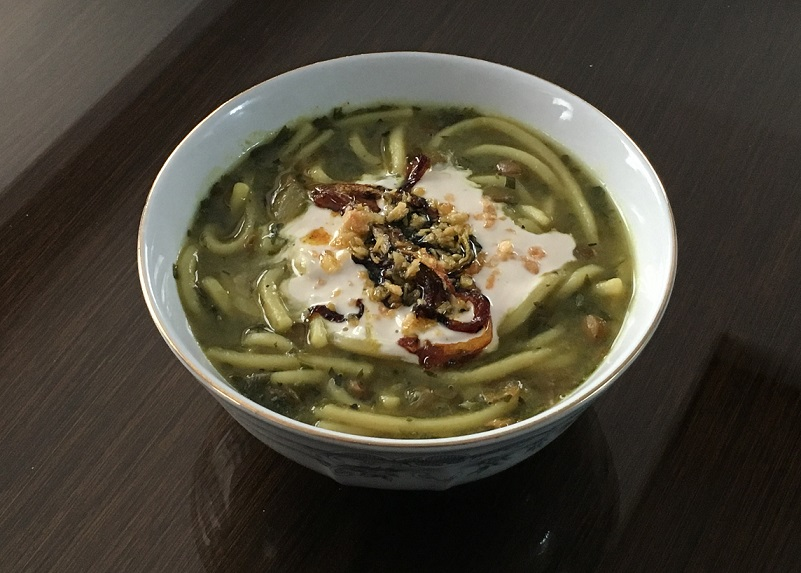
- Aush reshteh
- Alternative names: Āsh, Ash, Aash
- Type: Soup
- Place of origin: Persia (now Iran)
- Region or state: Iran, Afghanistan, Azerbaijan, Turkey, South Caucasus,
- Serving temperature: hot
- Main ingredients: Noodles, vegetables, broth, chaka
- Variations: ash-e anar (pomegranate stew), ash-e-jo (barley stew), ash-e doogh (yogurt soup), ash-e sak (spinach stew).

Aush (/ˈɔːʃ, ˈɑːʃ/ AWSH, AHSH; Persian: آش [ˈɒːʃ]), properly romanized as āsh, is a variety of thick soup, usually served hot. It is part of Iranian cuisine and Afghan cuisine, and is also found in Azerbaijani, Turkish, and South Caucasian cuisines.

== Etymology ==
The spelling of the name of this dish varies in English and can include aush, āsh, ashe, ashe, āshe, aash, or osh. Aush means "thick soup" in Iranian languages.

The noun "cook" translates to "Ashpaz" (آشپز) in Persian. The word is a combination of two Persian words of "aush" and "paz" and literally means "a person who cooks aush". Also the word "kitchen" in Persian is "Ashpazkhaneh" (آشپزخانه) literally meaning "cookhouse".

== History ==
This Persian dish has its roots in ancient times, with some accounts tracing it to the Sasanian Empire from the 3rd to the 7th century AD. Aush was originally a humble peasant food that arose due to the need for sustenance in a challenging agricultural environment.

Aush plays a prominent role in Iranian celebrations and gatherings, with variations like Aush Reshteh taking center stage during Nowruz, the Persian New Year.

== Ingredients ==
Aush is typically made with a variation of ingredients but may include flat wheat noodles, turmeric, vegetables (broccoli, carrots, onion, celery, spinach), legumes (chickpeas, kidney beans), herbs (dill, mint, coriander, minced cilantro), and optional meat such as ground lamb, beef or chicken. Depending on the type of aush, it could contain different types of grain, legumes (chick peas, black-eye beans, lentils), vegetables, tomato, herbs (parsley, spinach, dill, spring onion ends, coriander, dried mint), yogurt, onions, oil, meat, garlic, and spices, such as salt, pepper, turmeric, saffron, etc.

Aush can be considered a full meal or a first course. Aush can often be bought in Persian stores canned, as dried mixes or frozen.

== Regional variation ==
=== Afghan cuisine ===
The Afghan soup is usually made with noodles and different vegetables in a tomato-based broth. The Afghan version of the soup is more likely to have tomatoes or a tomato broth. It is topped with chaka (yogurt sauce), fried garlic, and dried/crushed mint leaves.

=== Iranian cuisine ===
There are more than 50 types of thick soup (āsh) in Iranian cooking, ash reshteh being one of the more popular types; using reshteh. Some other well known āsh include ash-e anar (pomegranate stew), ash-e-jo (barley stew), ash-e doogh (yogurt stew), ash-e sak (spinach stew), ash-e torsh (beet/pickle stew), and aush-e-shalgham (turnip stew). The Iranian variation of aush often is topped with a garnish (na’na dagh) of fried mint oil, garlic chips, and/or shallot chips. In Jewish Iranian cuisine, aush is not typically served with dairy or yogurt.

== See also ==
- Ash-e anar
- Ash reshteh
- Ash-e-doogh
- Chorba
- Kalehjoosh
- List of soups
