= Abu Bakr Muhammad ibn al-Abbas al-Khwarizmi =

Abū Bakr Muḥammad b. al-ʿAbbās al-Khwarizmi (934 – Nishapur, 1002) was a poet and writer in the Arabic language. He gained patronage variously in the courts of Aleppo (with Sayf al-Dawla), Bukhara (with vizier Abu Ali Bal'ami ), Nishapur (praising its emir, Ahmad al-Mikali), Sijistan (under Tahir ibn Muhammad), Gharchistan, and Arrajan (with Sahib ibn Abbad).
