= Jiaozi =

Chinese dumplings

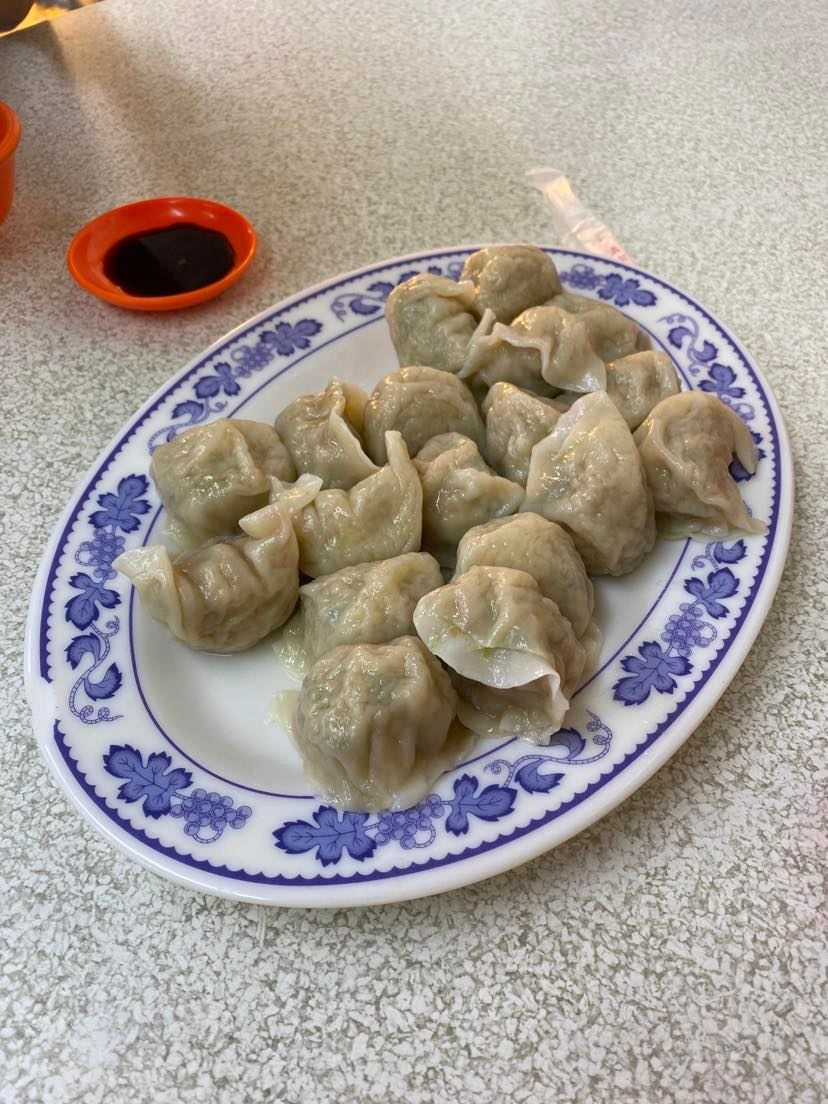
- A plate of boiled jiaozi with dipping sauce
- Type: Dumpling
- Course: Entrée
- Place of origin: China
- Region or state: East Asia
- Main ingredients: Dough, ground meat, or vegetables
- Other information: Unicode emoji 🥟

Chinese name
- Traditional Chinese: 餃子
- Simplified Chinese: 饺子
Transcriptions
Standard Mandarin
- Hanyu Pinyin: jiǎozi
- Bopomofo: ㄐㄧㄠˇ ㄗ˙
- Wade–Giles: chiao^{3}-tzu^{5}
- Tongyong Pinyin: jiǎo-zih
- IPA: [tɕjàʊ.tsɹ̩]
Wu
- Suzhounese: ciau^{3}-tsy^{3}
Hakka
- Romanization: giau^{2} ê^{3}
Yue: Cantonese
- Yale Romanization: gáau-jí
- Jyutping: gaau2 zi2
- IPA: [kaw˧˥ tsi˧˥]

Vietnamese name
- Vietnamese: Sủi cảo

Korean name
- Hangul: 만두
- Hanja: 饅頭

Japanese name
- Kanji: 餃子
- Kana: ぎょうざ
Transcriptions
- Romanization: Gyōza

Malay name
- Malay: Ladu cina (لادو چينا)

Indonesian name
- Indonesian: Ladu cina

Manchu name
- Manchu script: ᡤᡳᠶᠣᠰᡝ
- Möllendorff: giyose

Jiaozi (simplified Chinese: 饺子; traditional Chinese: 餃子; pinyin: jiǎo zi; [tɕjàʊ.tsɹ̩]) are a type of Chinese dumpling. They typically consist of a ground meat or vegetable filling wrapped into a thinly rolled piece of dough, which is then sealed by pressing the edges together. They can be boiled (水饺; 水餃; shuǐjiǎo), steamed (蒸饺; 蒸餃; zhēngjiǎo), pan-fried (煎饺; 煎餃; jiānjiǎo), deep-fried (炸饺; 炸餃; zhájiǎo, zhàjiǎo), or baked (烤饺; 烤餃; kǎojiǎo), and are traditionally served with a black vinegar and soy sauce dip. They can also be served in a soup (汤饺; 湯餃; tāngjiǎo). Jiaozi have great cultural significance within China. They are one of the major dishes eaten during the Chinese New Year throughout northern China and eaten all year round in the northern provinces. Their resemblance to the gold and silver ingots (sycee) used in Imperial China has meant that they symbolize wealth and good fortune.

A Japanese variety of jiaozi is referred to as gyōza. Jiaozi was introduced to Japan by the return of millions of Japanese colonizers from China following the end of World War II (specifically the Second Sino-Japanese War). In the West, pan-fried jiaozi or jianjiao may be referred to as potstickers, derived from the Chinese word guōtiē (鍋貼; 'pot stick').

== Origin and custom ==
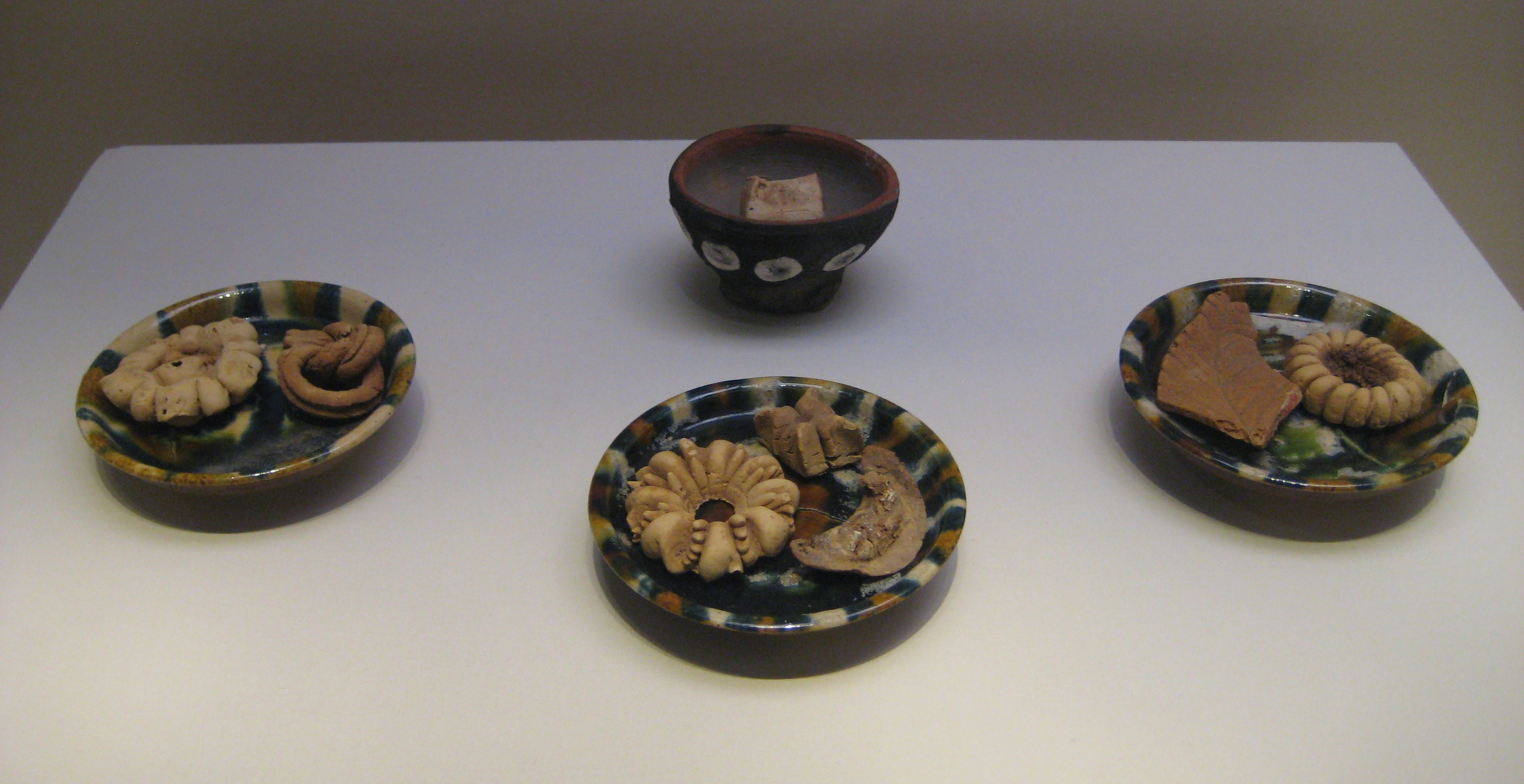
Pottery dumpling and delicacies from a Tang-dynasty tomb

In China, several folk stories explain the origin of jiaozi and its name.

Traditionally, jiaozi were thought to have been invented during the era of the Eastern Han (AD 25–220) by Zhang Zhongjing who was a great practitioner of traditional Chinese medicine. Jiaozi were originally referred to as "tender ears" (Chinese: 嬌耳; pinyin: jiāo'ěr) because they were used to treat frostbitten ears. Zhang Zhongjing was on his way home during wintertime when he saw that many common people had frostbitten ears, because they did not have warm clothes and sufficient food. He treated these poor people by stewing lamb, black pepper, and some warming medicines in a pot, chopped them, and used them to fill small dough wrappers. He boiled these dumplings and gave them with the broth to his patients, until the coming of the Chinese New Year. In order to celebrate the New Year as well as recovering from frostbitten ears, people imitated Zhang's recipe to make tender ears.

In the Western Han dynasty (206 BC – AD 9) jiaozi (餃子) were called jiaozi (角子). During the Three Kingdoms period (AD 220–280), the book Guangya by Zhang Yi mentions jiaozi. Yan Zhitui during the Northern Qi dynasty (AD 550–577) wrote: "Today the jiaozi, shaped like a crescent moon, is a common food in the world." Six Dynasties Turfan tombs contained dumplings. Later in the Tang dynasty (AD 618–907), jiaozi become more popular, called Bian Shi (扁食). Chinese archaeologists have found a bowl of jiaozi in the Tang dynasty tombs in Turpan. 7th or 8th century dumplings and wontons were found in Turfan.

Jiaozi may also be named because they are horn-shaped. The Chinese word for "horn" is jiao (Chinese: 角; pinyin: jiǎo), and jiaozi was originally written with the Chinese character for "horn", but later it was replaced by the specific character 餃, which has the food radical on the left and the phonetic component jiāo (交) on the right.

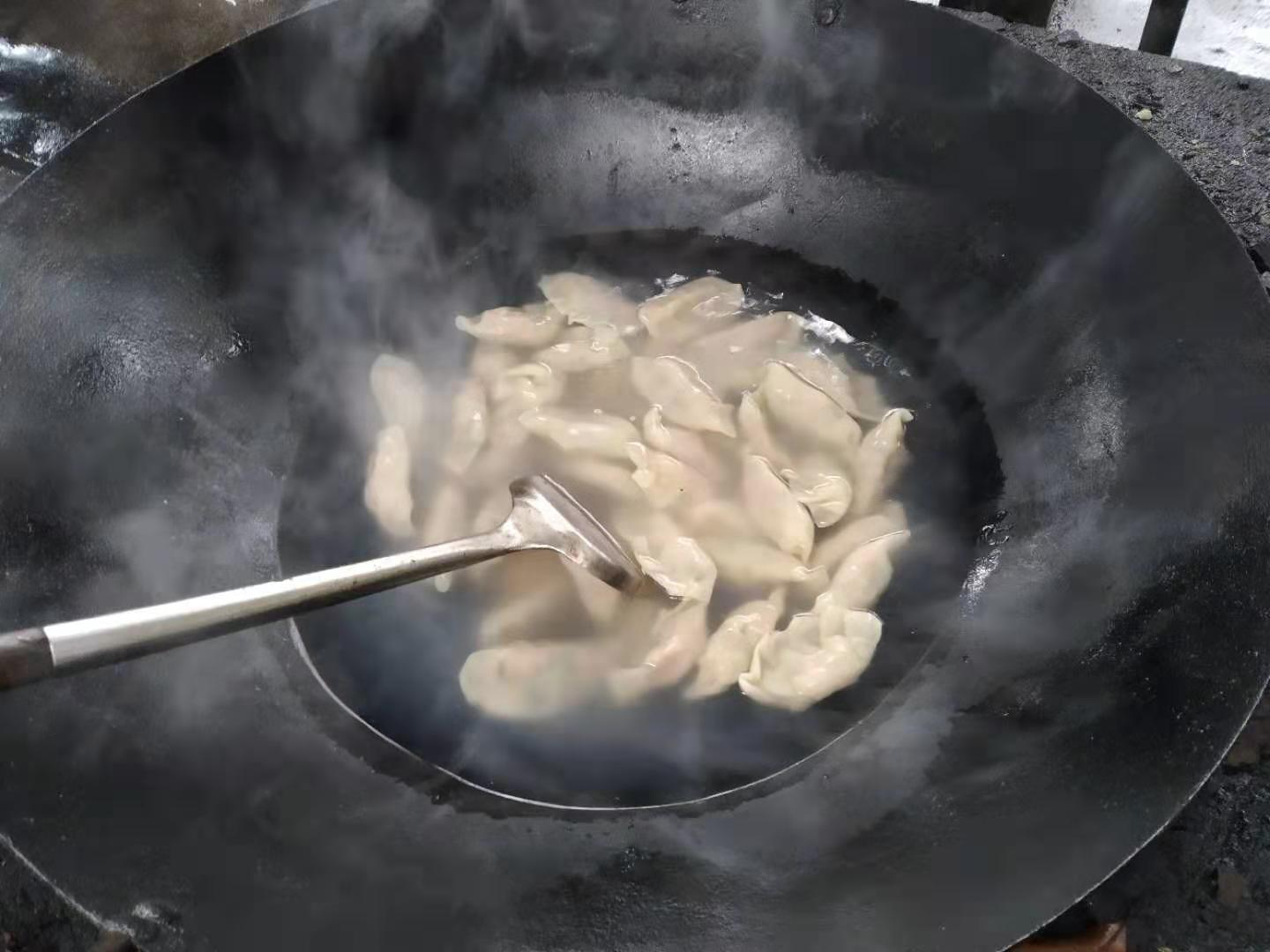
Cooking jiaozi in a wok on a wood stove

At the same time, jiaozi look like yuan bao silver or gold ingots used as currency during the Ming dynasty, and as the name sounds like the word for the earliest paper money, serving them is believed to bring prosperity. Many families eat these at midnight on Chinese New Year's Eve. Some cooks will even hide a clean coin inside a jiaozi for the lucky to find.

Nowadays, jiaozi are eaten year-round, and can be eaten for breakfast, lunch or dinner. They can be served as an appetizer, a side dish, or as the main course. In China, sometimes jiaozi is served as a last course during restaurant meals. As a breakfast dish, jiaozi are prepared alongside xiaolongbao at inexpensive roadside restaurants. Typically, they are served in small steamers containing ten pieces each. Although mainly serving jiaozi to breakfast customers, these small restaurants keep them hot on steamers and ready to eat all day. Jiaozi is always served with a dipping sauce that may include vinegar, soy sauce, garlic, ginger, rice wine, hot sauce, and sesame oil. They can also be served with soup.

== Types ==
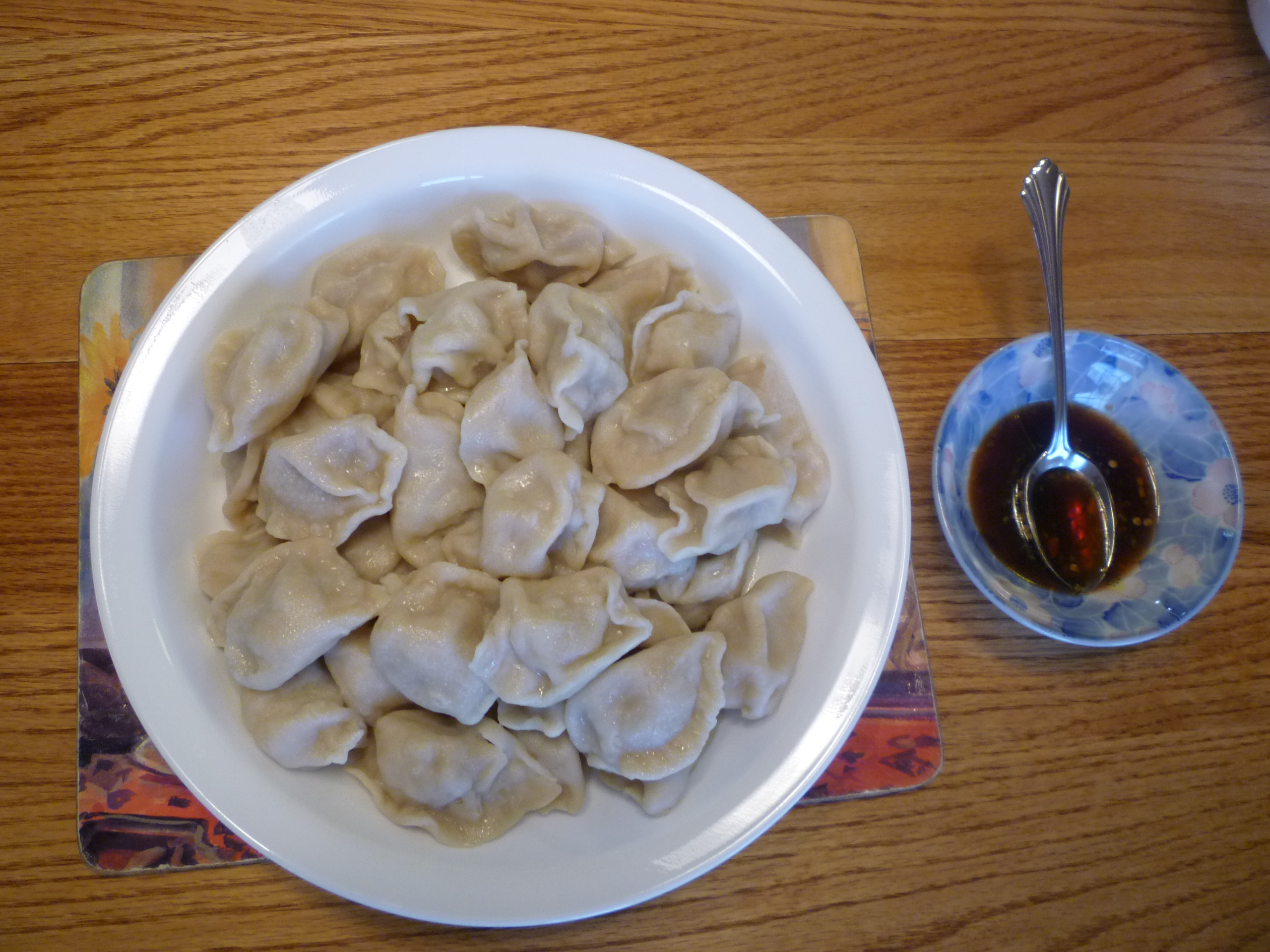
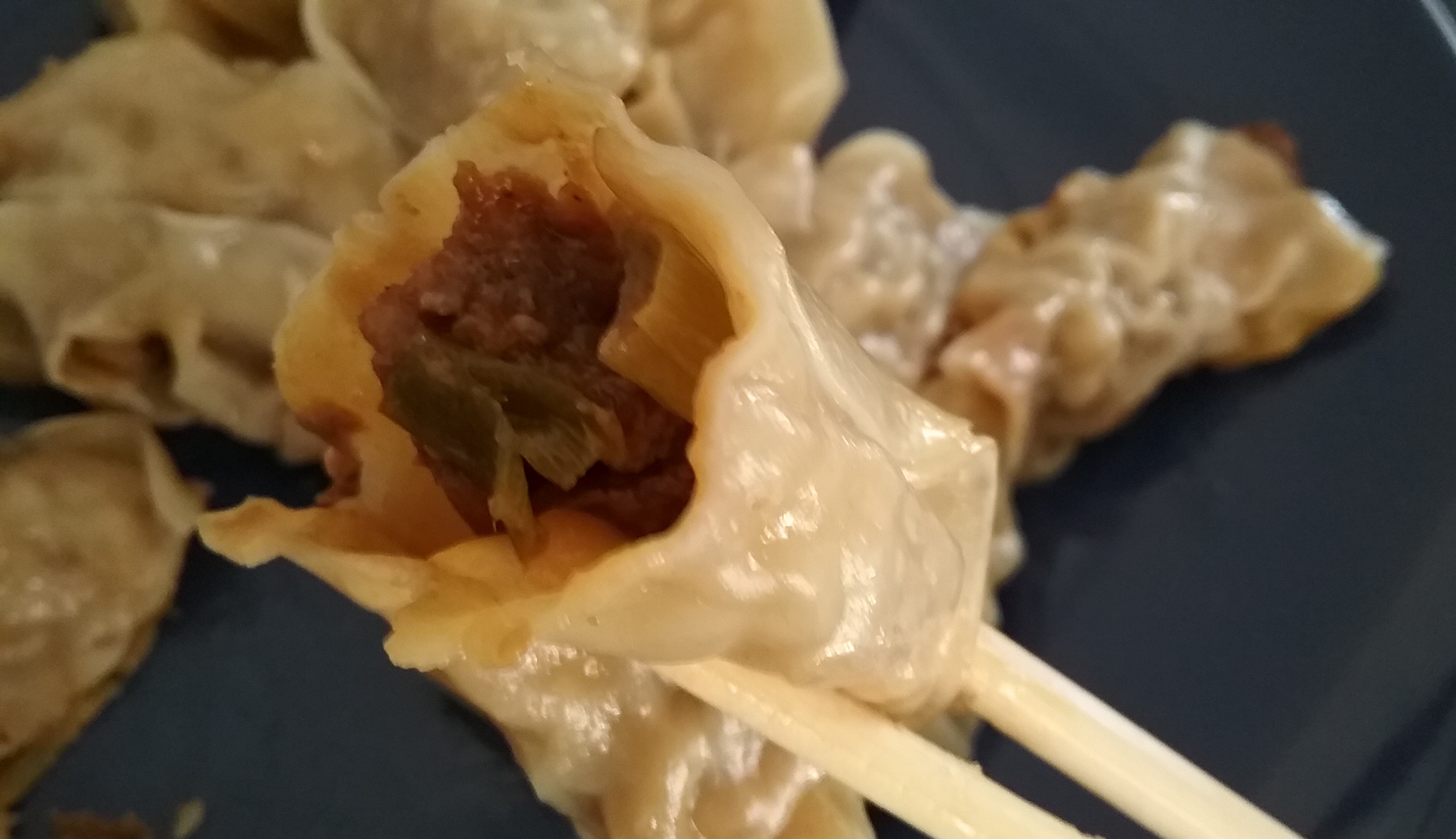
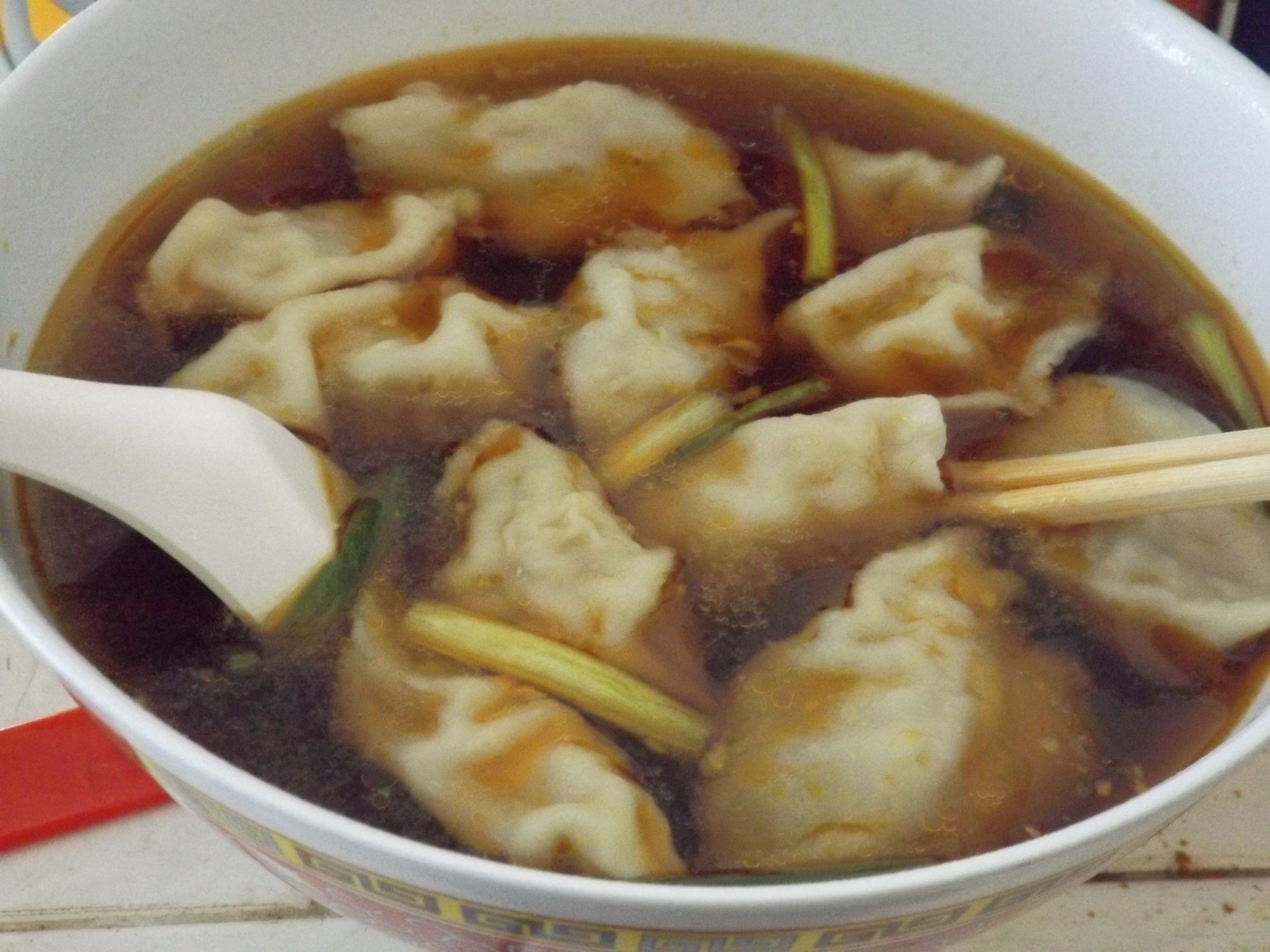
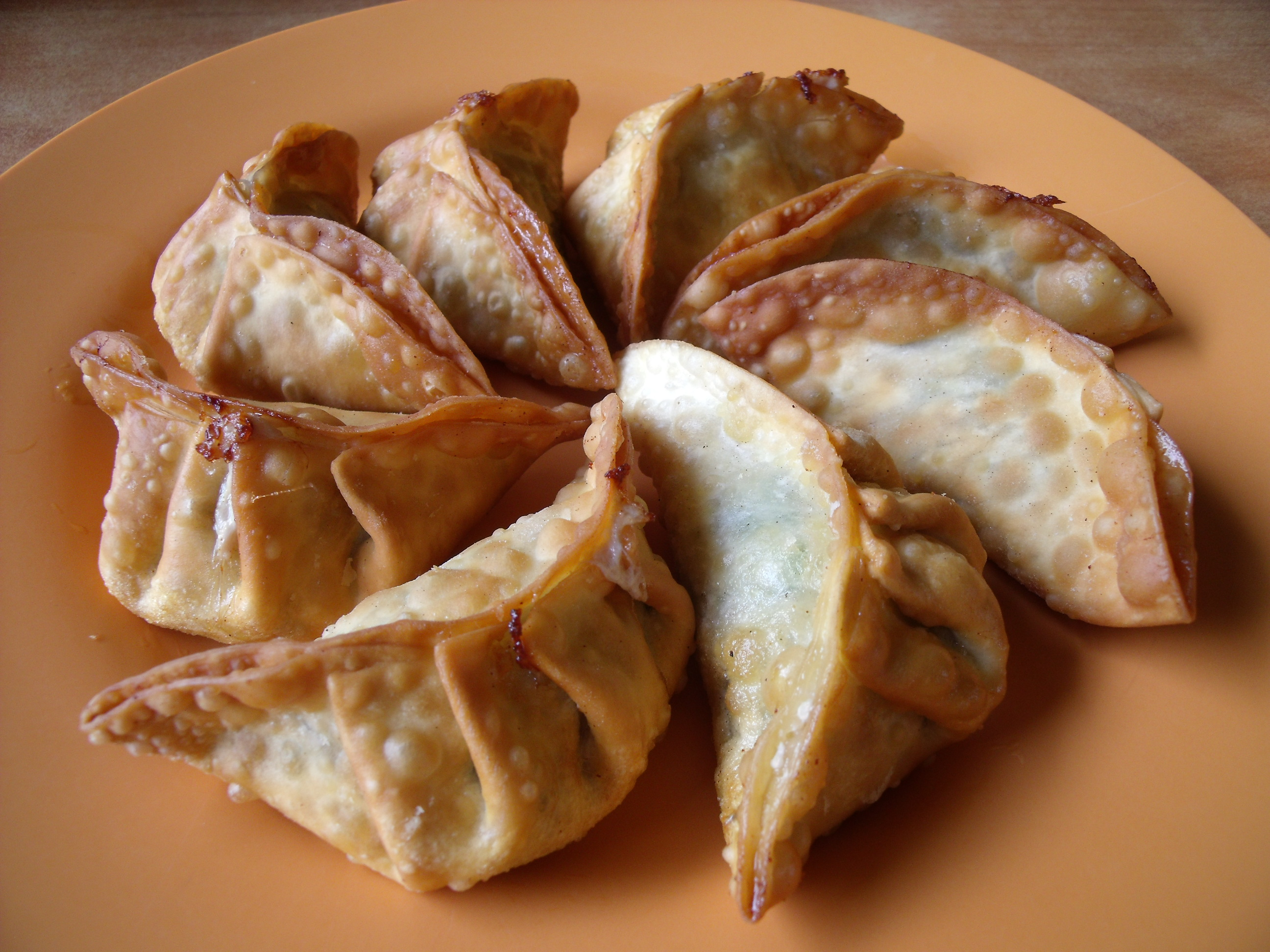
Four types of jiaozi. Clockwise from upper left: boiled dumplings (shuijiao), steamed dumplings (zhengjiao), deep-fried dumplings (zhajiao), soup dumplings (tangjiao).

Jiaozi may be divided into various types depending on how they are cooked:

- Boiled jiaozi (simplified Chinese: 水饺; traditional Chinese: 水餃; pinyin: shuǐjiǎo; lit. 'water dumpling')
- Steamed jiaozi (蒸饺; 蒸餃; zhēngjiǎo)
- Pan-fried jiaozi (煎饺; 煎餃; jiānjiǎo; 'dry-fried dumplings'), also referred to as "pot-stickers" (锅贴; 鍋貼; guōtiē) in southern China
- Deep-fried jiaozi (炸饺; 炸餃; zhàjiǎo)
- Baked jiaozi (烤饺; 烤餃; kǎojiǎo)
- Soup dumplings (汤饺; 湯餃; tāngjiǎo)

Jiaozi that use egg rather than dough to wrap the filling are called "egg dumplings" (蛋饺; 蛋餃; dànjiǎo).

Pan-fried jiaozi can be joined by a brown, crispy lattice base created by pouring a flour and water mix into the pan at the end of cooking. In Chinese, this is known as "frost" or "ice crystal" (冰花). The dumplings can also be joined with an egg base which is topped with green onion and sesame seeds.

== Fillings ==
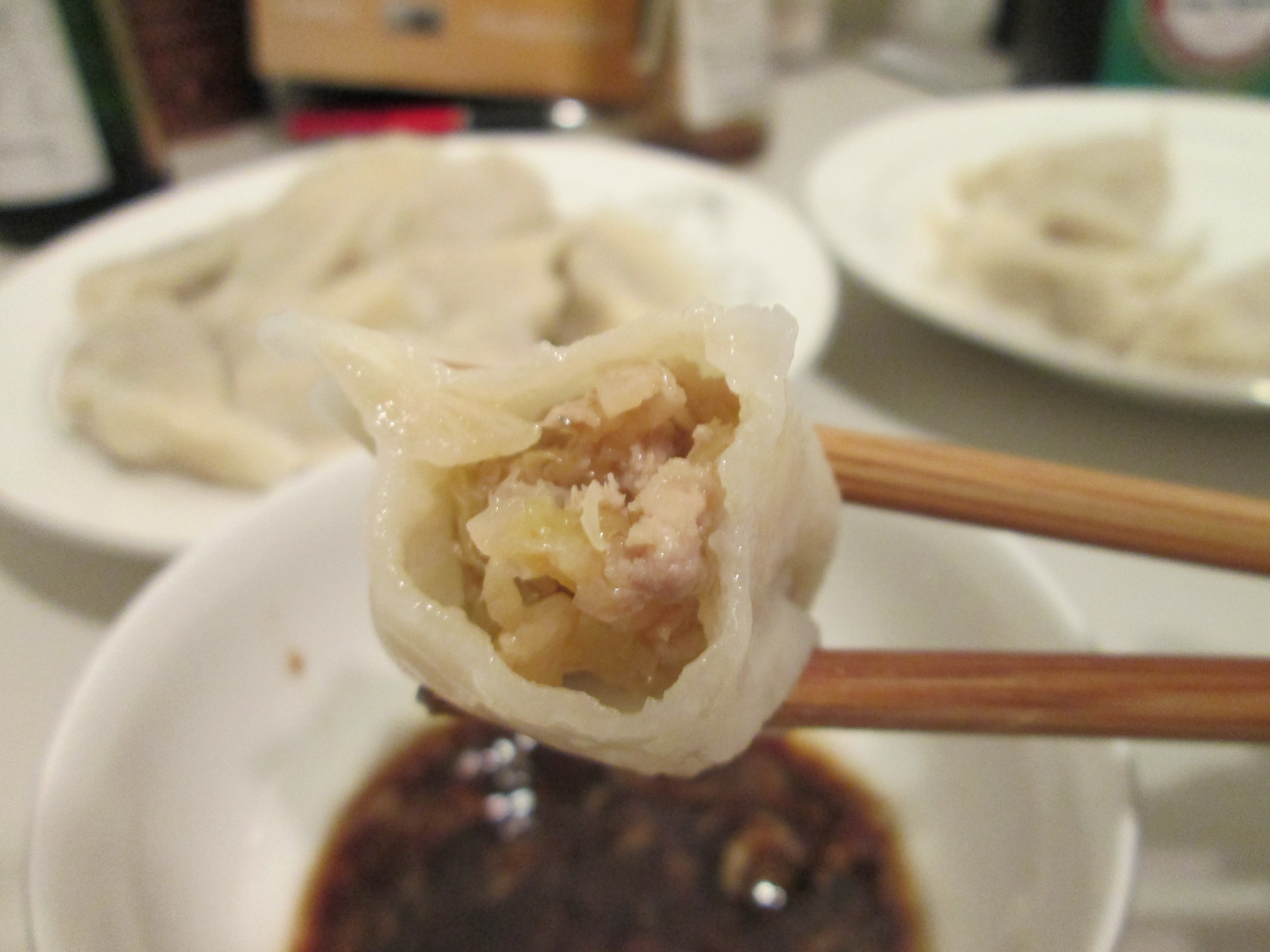
Chinese sauerkraut-filled dumplings (酸菜水餃), Northeastern Chinese style

Common jiaozi meat fillings include chicken, pork, beef, shrimp, and fish which are usually mixed with chopped vegetables. Popular vegetable fillings include napa cabbage, scallion (spring onions), celery, leek, spinach, mushroom, carrot, garlic chives, and edible black fungus.

== Folding technique ==
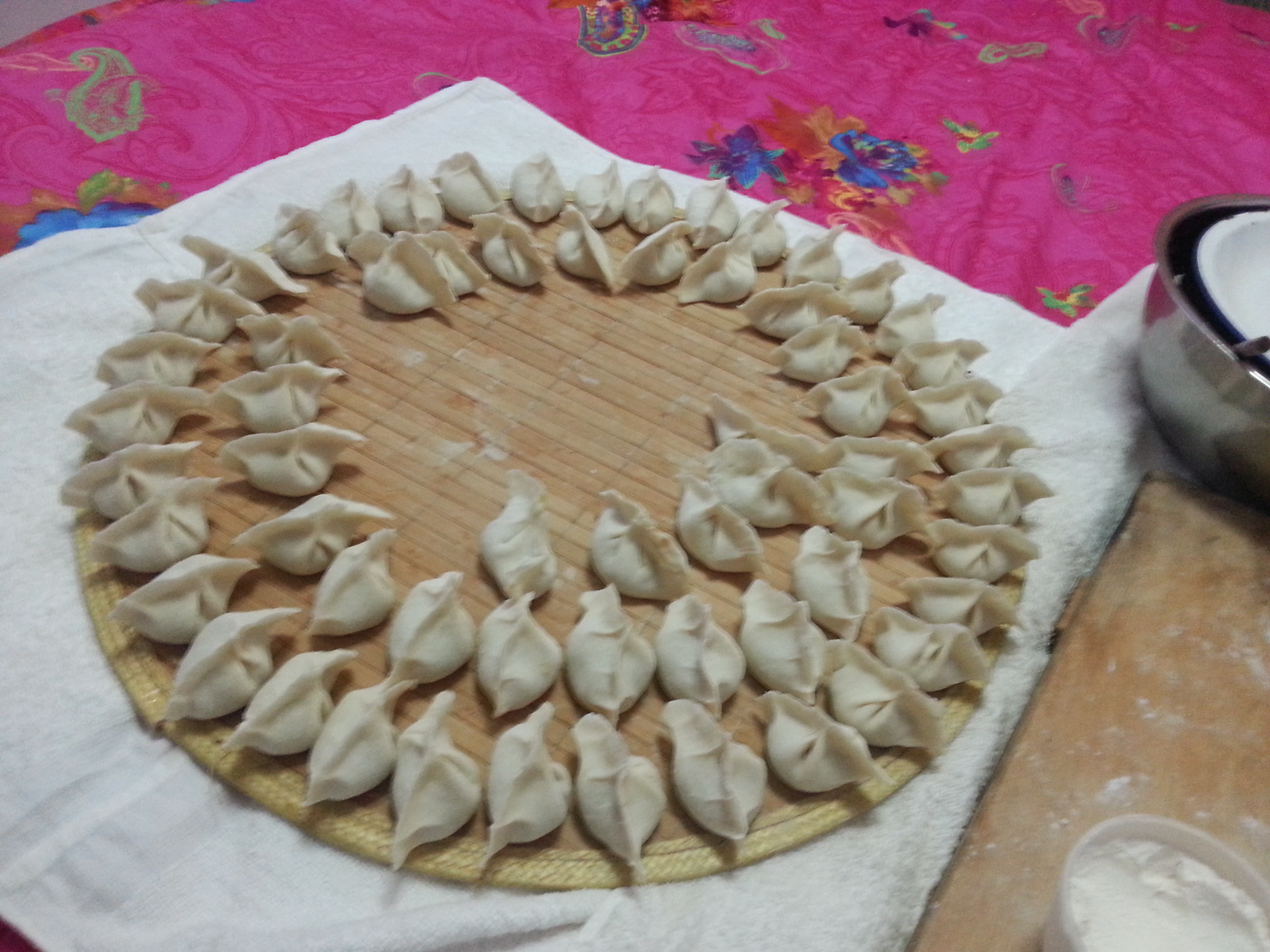
In north China, folded jiaozi are placed on bi (箅), to prevent the stuffing from making the shape sag. Bi is made of dried sorghum stems, and gives jiaozi a mark on the bottom.

There are many ways to fold jiaozi. Basically, steps for folding the skin include putting a single pleat in the middle, putting multiple pleats along the edge, making a wavy edge like a pie crust, turning a pleated edge in toward the body resulting in a rounded edge, and putting both ends together resulting in a round shape. Different shapes of jiaozi require different folding techniques, but the most famous and common technique is the pinched-edge fold. Take a wrapper and put one tablespoon of filling into the center of the wrapper. Fold a half of edge to the other half. Use left thumb and forefinger to pinch one side of the half-moon wrapper, and then use right thumb to push the inside skin outward, right forefinger to make outside skin into small pleats. Use right thumb to clench those pleats. Repeat these steps to the other side of the wrapper, and make sure to clench the seal. This is crescent-shaped jiaozi, the most popular shape in China.

== Variations ==
=== Cantonese ===
Jiaozi is called gaau ji in Cantonese and is standard fare in dim sum. The immediate noted difference to Northern style is that they are smaller and wrapped in a thinner translucent skin, and usually steamed. The smaller size and the thinner wrapper make the dumplings easier to cook through with steaming. In contrast to jiaozi, Cantonese gaau ji are rarely homemade because the wrapper, which needs to be thin but tough enough to not break, is more difficult to make. Many types of fillings exist, with the most common type being har gow (simplified Chinese: 虾饺; traditional Chinese: 蝦餃; Cantonese Yale: hā gáau; lit. 'shrimp dumplings'), but fillings can include scallop, chicken, tofu, and mixed vegetables; dim sum restaurants often feature their own house specials or innovations. Dim sum chefs and artists often use ingredients in new or creative ways, or draw inspiration from other Chinese culinary traditions, such as Chaozhou, Hakka, or Shanghai. More creative chefs may even create fusion gaau ji by using elements from other cultures, such as Japanese (teriyaki) or Southeast Asian (satay or curry), while upscale restaurants may use expensive or exotic ingredients such as lobster, shark fin, and bird's nest.

Another Cantonese dumpling is yau gok (Chinese: 油角; pinyin: yóu jiǎo; Cantonese Yale: yàuh gok), which are made with glutinous rice dough and deep fried.

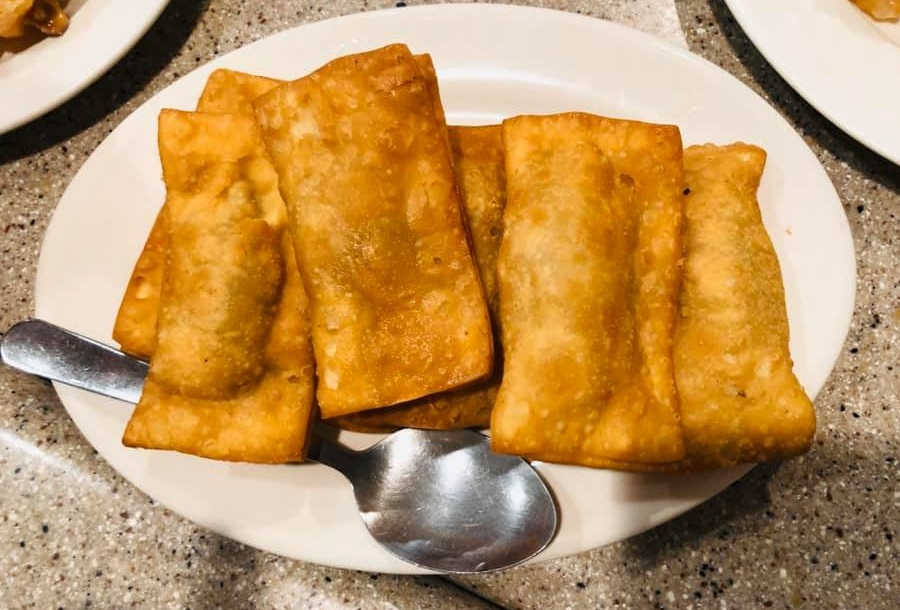
Crispy gau gee in Hawaii

Gau gee (crispy gau gee or kau gee) is a Hawaiian derivative of Cantonese origin brought about during the migration of Chinese in the mid-1800s. The deep-fried dumplings consist of a seasoned ground pork filling in a thick square wonton wrapper that is typically folded half into rectangles or triangles. It is usually accompanied with a condiment of soy sauce mixed with mustard. They are mistakenly called fried wontons in error because the pre-packaged store-bought wrappers are labeled as "wonton wrappers".

=== Guotie (potstickers) ===
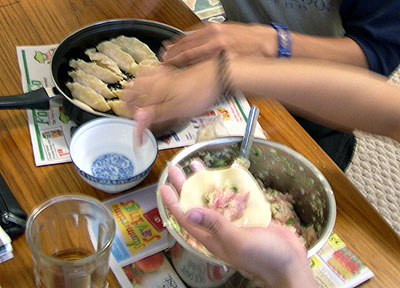
Making potstickers

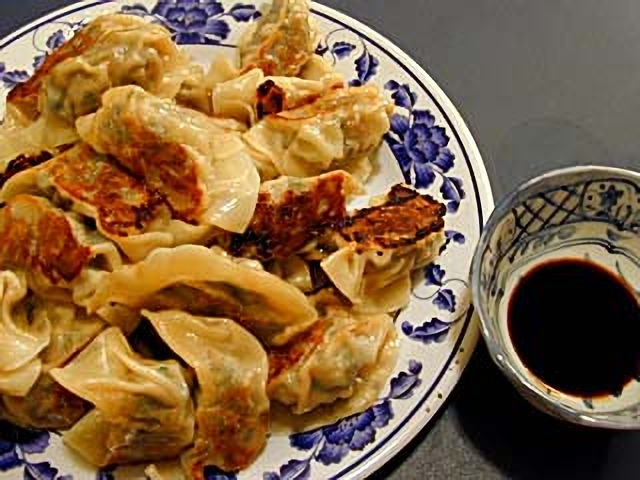
A plate of potstickers and dipping sauce

Guotie (Chinese: 鍋貼; pinyin: guōtiē; lit. 'pot stick') are a type of northern Chinese dumpling which are popular as a street food, appetizer, or side order. Guotie differ from pan-fried jiaozi, or jianjiao, in that the shape of guotie is usually elongated. In North China, the two ends of the guotie are often left open. Guotie are sometimes served on a dim sum menu, but may be offered independently. The filling for both guotie and jiaozi usually contains pork (sometimes chicken, or beef in Muslim areas), cabbage (or Chinese cabbage and sometimes spinach), scallions (spring or green onions), ginger, Chinese rice wine or cooking wine, and sesame seed oil. In northern China, the guotie is considered a separate type of dumpling from the jiaozi. In southern China, the term "guotie" is often used as a synonym for the pan-fried jiaozi or jianjiao. In Shanghai guotie refers to a type of dumping, containing only meat, that looks similar to jiaozi but is specifically prepared to be pan fried only and never cooked any other way. In the Western world, jianjiao are often referred to as potstickers because the term was introduced to the West by Buwei Yang Chao's book How to Cook and Eat in Chinese (1949 revised enlarged edition), who hailed from southern China.

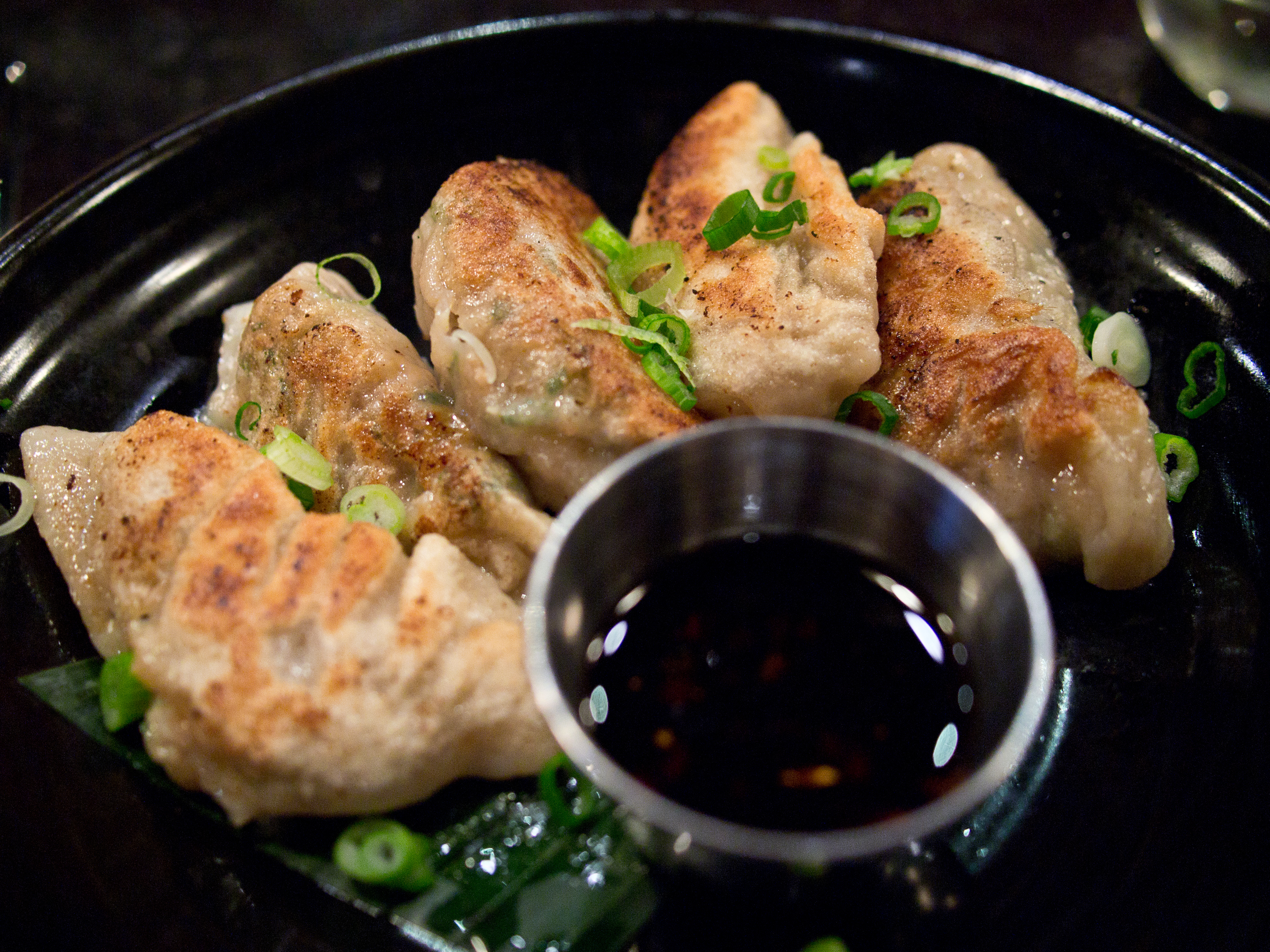
Fried dumplings served with green onion and sauce

=== Gyōza ===
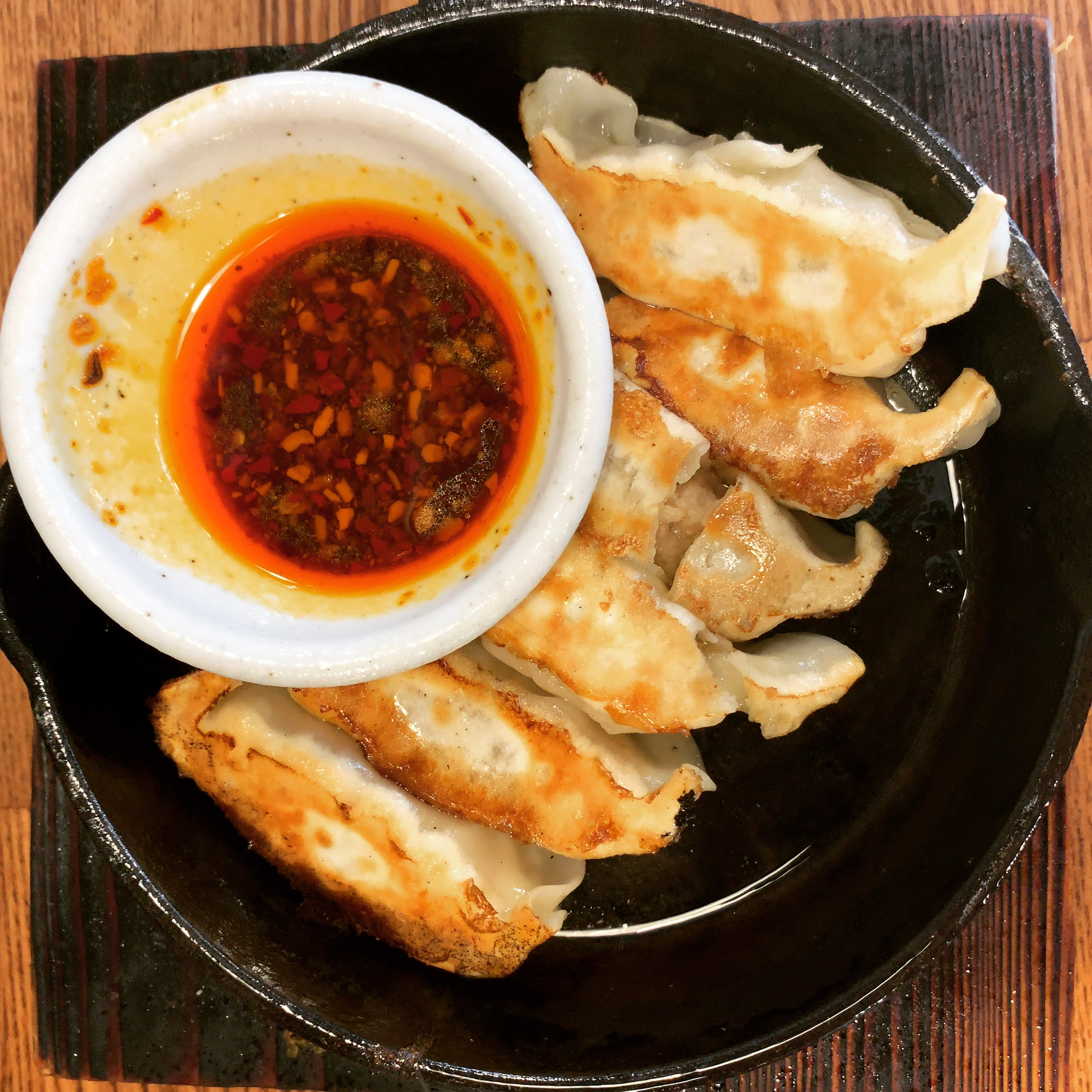
Gyōza with chili oil

Making gyōza in Tokyo, 2021

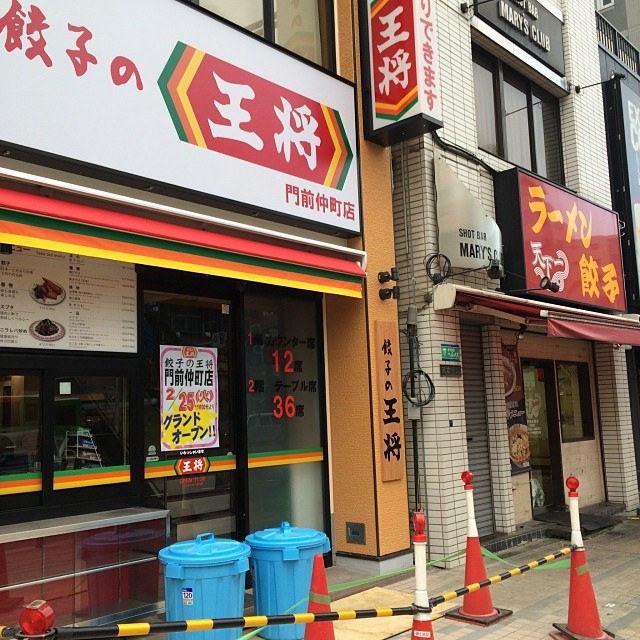
Gyōza no Ōshō restaurant in Japan at Monzen-Nakachō Station

Gyōza are a Japanese version of jiaozi, developed from recipes brought back by Japanese colonizers returning from the Japanese-backed puppet state of Manchukuo in Northeast China after World War II. The word gyōza was likely adopted by Japanese settler colonists from the Manchu word giyose. Many Japanese repatriates, already familiar with Chinese cuisine, opened yatai (food stalls) serving ramen and began offering gyōza as a side dish.

The prevalent differences between Japanese-style gyōza and Chinese-style jiaozi are the rich garlic flavor, which is less noticeable in the Chinese version (this is mainly due to the lack of ingredients in Japan and due to the palate of the Japanese people at the time who, unlike the Chinese, did not have a meat-rich diet), and that gyōza wrappers tend to be thinner, due to the fact that most Japanese restaurants use machine-made wrappers. In contrast, the rustic cuisine of poor Chinese immigrants shaped Westerners' views that Chinese restaurant jiaozi use thicker handmade wrappers. As jiaozi vary greatly across regions within China, these differences are not as clear in the country of origin. For example, visitors will easily find thin-skinned jiaozi at restaurants in Shanghai and at street food vendors in the Hangzhou region. Gyōza wrappers are actually identical to jiaozi wrappers seen in Chinese households using store-bought machine-made wrappers. Gyōza are usually served with soy-based tare sauce seasoned with rice vinegar or chili oil (rāyu in Japanese, làyóu (辣油) in Mandarin Chinese). The most common recipe is a mixture of minced pork (sometimes chicken or beef), cabbage, Asian chives, sesame oil, garlic or ginger, which is then wrapped in the thinly rolled dough skins. Gyōza share similarities with both pierogi and spring rolls and are cooked in the same fashion as pierogi, either boiled or fried.

Gyōza and gyōza wrappers can be found in supermarkets and restaurants throughout Japan, either frozen or ready to eat. Pan-fried gyōza are sold as a side dish in many ramen and Chinese restaurants. Both the wrappers and the prepared gyōza themselves are increasingly easy to find in Asian markets around the world.

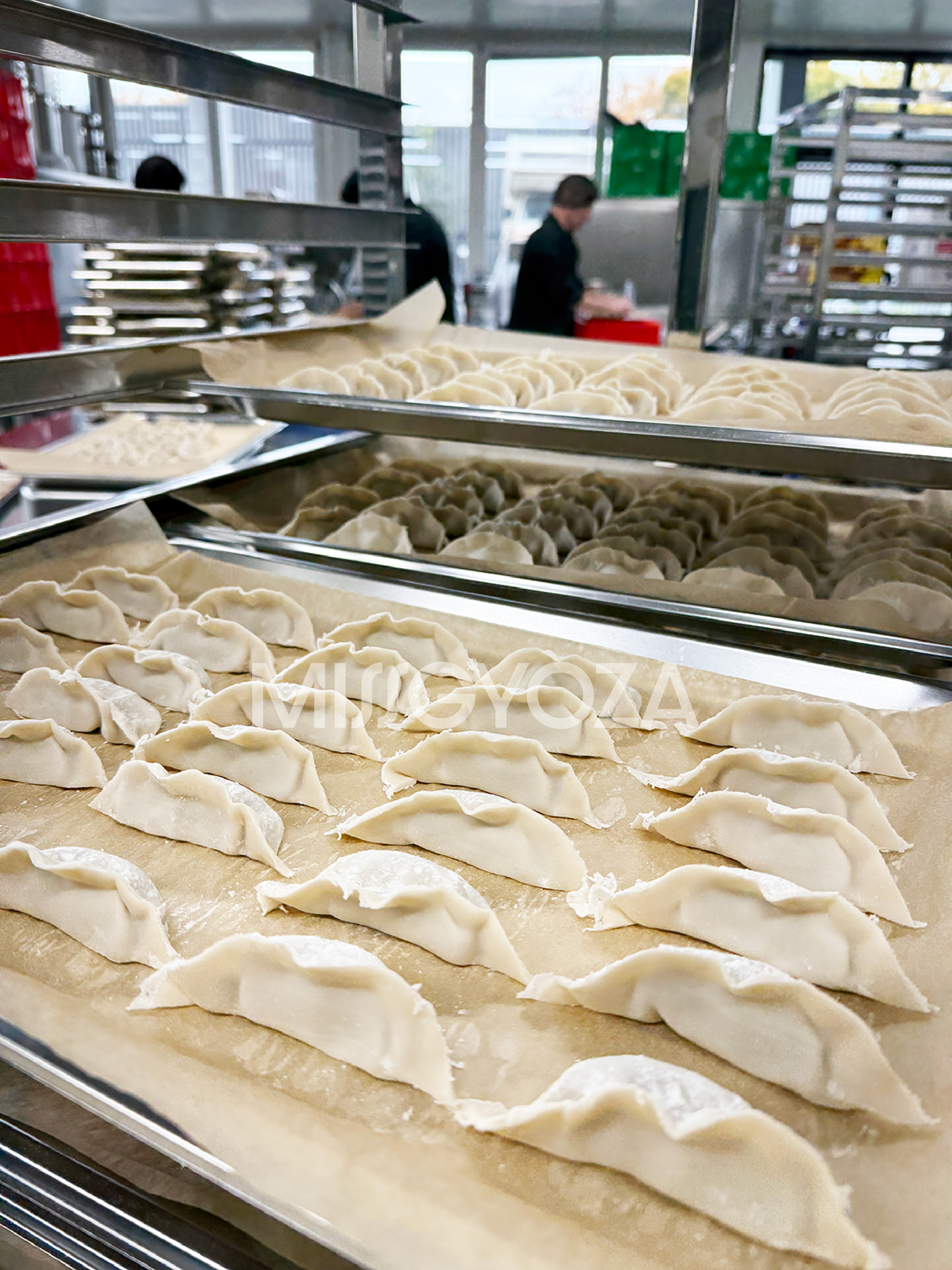
Gyoza Production in Switzerland

In Europe, gyōza is becoming increasingly popular as Japanese restaurants promote it as a starter or even as a main dish served with rice. Local production is also emerging, particularly in Switzerland, driven by the zero-kilometer and low-CO₂ footprint concepts, using locally sourced ingredients.

The most popular preparation method is the pan-fried style called yaki-gyōza (焼き餃子), in which the dumpling is first fried on one flat side, creating a crispy skin. Then, water is added and the pan sealed with a lid, until the upper part of the dumpling is steamed. This technique is what the Chinese call making potstickers (see above). Other popular methods include boiling sui-gyōza (水餃子) and deep frying age-gyōza (揚げ餃子).

Store-bought frozen dumplings are often prepared at home by first placing them in a pot of water, bringing it to a boil, and then transferring them to a pan with oil to fry the skin.

=== Mandu ===
Mandu (Korean: 만두; Hanja: 饅頭), or mandoo, are dumplings in Korean cuisine. Mandu can be steamed, boiled, pan-fried, or deep-fried. Although the dumpling originated in China, it is now considered one of the most recognized signature Korean dishes. The styles also vary across regions in the Korean Peninsula. Mandu were long part of Korean royal court cuisine, but are now found in supermarkets, restaurants, and snack places such as pojangmacha and bunsikjip throughout South Korea.

=== Momo ===
The Tibetan and Nepalese version is known as momo (Tibetan: མོག་མོག་; Nepali: मम). The word "momo" comes from a Chinese loanword, "momo" (饃饃), which translates to "steamed bread". When preparing momo, flour is filled, most commonly with ground water buffalo meat. Often, ground lamb or chicken meat is used as alternate to water buffalo meat. In Nepal there is also a vegetarian option where mixtures of potato, cheese and other vegetable items are mixed. Finely chopped onion, minced garlic, fresh minced ginger, cumin powder, salt, coriander/cilantro, etc. are added to the meat for flavor. A sauce made from cooked tomatoes flavored with Sichuan pepper and minced red chilies is often served along with momo.

The Nepalese momo is usually served with dipping sauces that include tomato based chutneys or sesame-based sauces. Sauces can be thick or thin consistency depending on the eatery (locally called chutney/achhar), that is normally made with tomato as the base ingredient. In the Kathmandu valley, the traditional way of serving momo (momocha) is 10 ping-pong-ball-sized round momo drowned in a tangy, tomatoey and nutty broth or sauce called jhol (watery soup/broth in Nepali) achar (served at room temperature, with watery/runny consistency, also known as Kathmandu-style momo). Jhol momo has a warm or hot broth poured over momo (not cooked in the soup/broth). To make the jhol achar one of the main ingredients is Nepali hog plum (lapsi), but if it is unavailable, lemon or lime juice can be used.

== Confusion with wonton ==
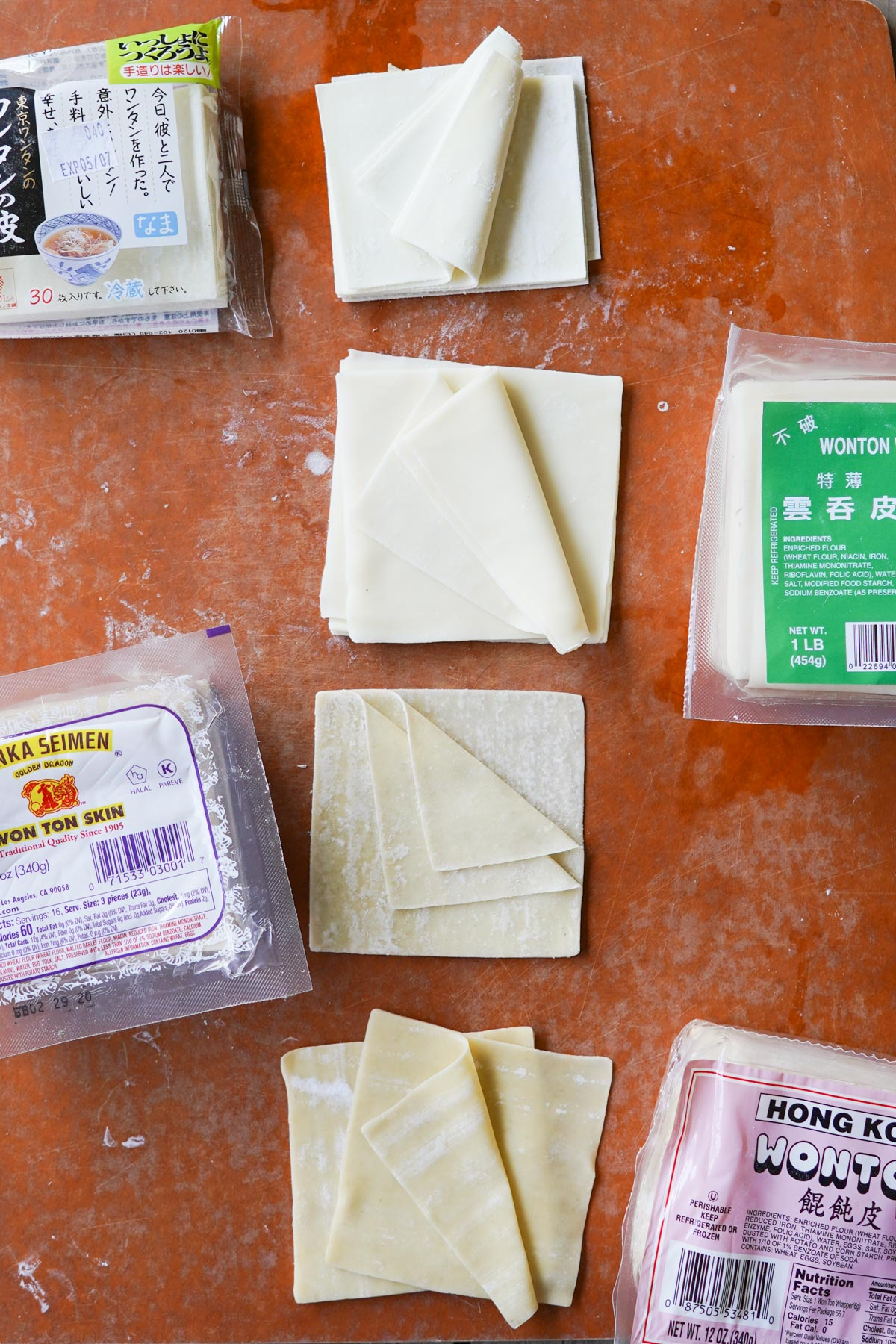
various wrappers labeled as wonton skins

Jiaozi are often confused with wonton. Jiaozi have a thicker skin and a relatively flatter, more oblate, double-saucer like shape, and are usually eaten with a soy-vinegar dipping sauce or hot chili sauce while wontons have thinner skin and are usually served in broth as soup. The dough for the jiaozi and wonton wrappers also consist of different ingredients. Amateur home cooks are perhaps unaware of the difference because pre-packaged store-bought wrappers are often labeled as "wonton skins" which are often a shortcut substitution for actual jiaozi wrappers.

In the greater Boston area, jiaozi are commonly referred to as Peking Ravioli, due in large part to chef Joyce Chen's influence. Chen renamed the dumplings to Peking Ravioli on her menus to appeal to Italian-American customers.

== See also ==
- Baozi – Chinese stuffed yeast bun
- Buuz, khuushuur, bansh – Mongolian
- Dim sim – Chinese jiaozi–inspired meat and vegetable snack food, popular in Australia and New Zealand.
- Aush jushpare – Iran
- Empanada – Spanish
- Gürzə – Azerbaijani
- Khinkali – Georgian
- Kreplach – Ashkenazi Jewish cuisine
- Maultasche – German
- Mandu – Korean
- Manti – Turkic
- Pastel - Brazilian
- Pelmeni – Russian
- Pierogi – Polish
- Ravioli – Italian
- Samosa – India
- Tortellini – Italian
- Varenyky – Ukrainian
- List of Chinese dishes
