= Reshteh =

Persian noodle

Reshteh (Persian: رشته), from the Persian word for thread or string, refers to a very fine noodle similar to capellini (angel hair pasta). However, it generally means a fresh (as opposed to dry) ribbon shaped egg noodle. Traditionally the noodle would be homemade and cut. Noodles are used for special occasion dishes in giving thanks and for journeys. Typical preparation is for the noodles to be broken into parts, fried or grilled brown and then added to rice.

The reshteh used currently in the Iranian cuisine is actually a thicker type of noodle, used in reshteh pollo and also a type of āsh, called aush reshteh.
