= Al-Khwarizmi al-Khati =

Abu al-Hakim Muhammad ibn Abd al-Malik al-Salihi al-Khwarizmi al-Khati, Al-Khati (flourished 1034), was a Muslim alchemist from the village of Kath in the Khwarezm region. He is known for systematizing Muslim alchemy.

Al-Khati lived and worked in Baghdad and nearby, and wrote Ain al-San'a wa awn al-Sunâ (The essential[s] of the Art and the Help for the Artisans). The work was crucial for the training of glass-makers, metallurgists, carpenters, and other craftsmen and artisans. The book provided detailed information on various techniques and methods used practically.
