= Pomegranate soup =

Iranian soup

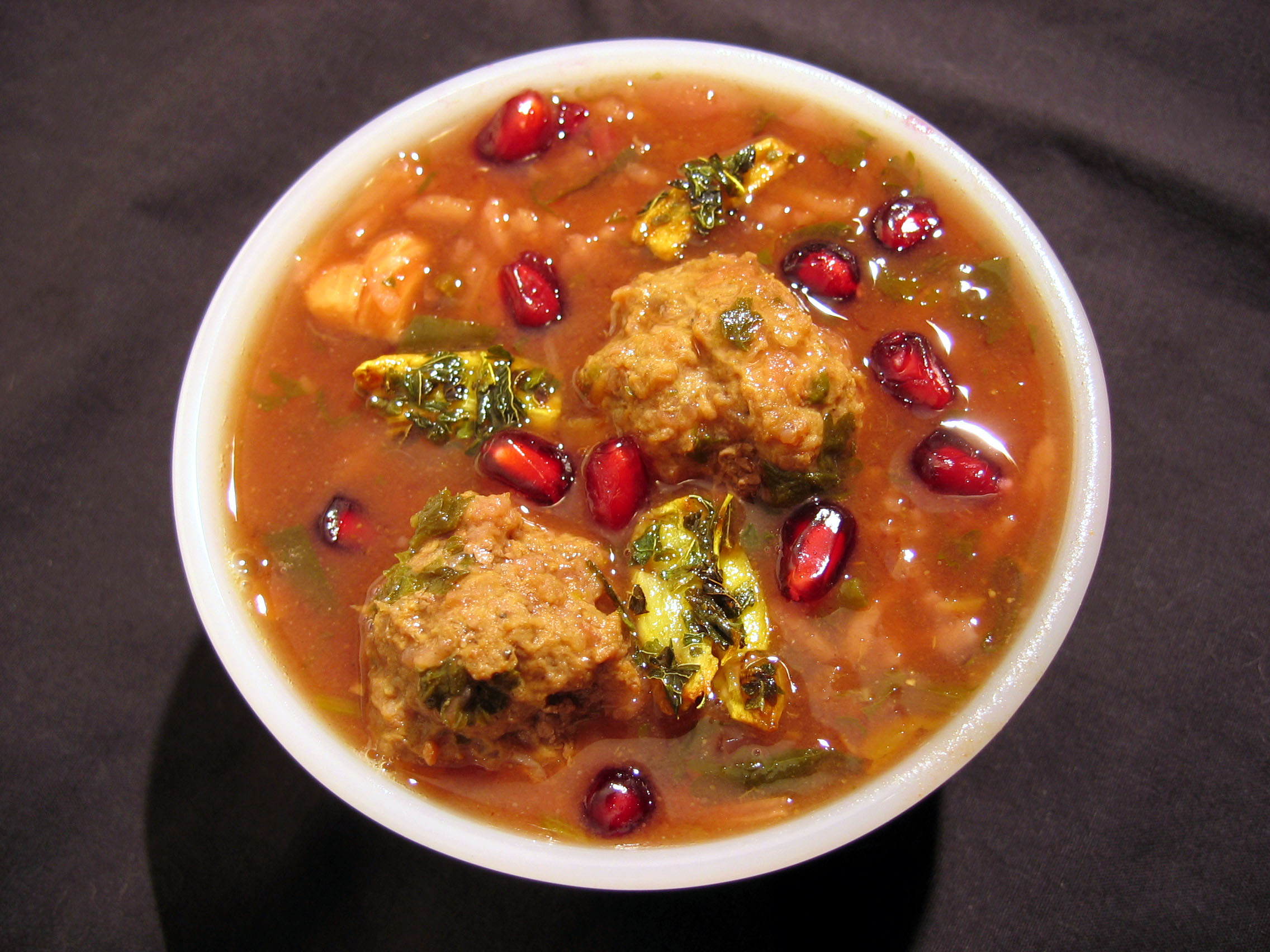
- A bowl of āsh-e anār
- Type: Āsh
- Place of origin: Iran
- Associated cuisine: Iranian cuisine
- Main ingredients: Pomegranate juice and seeds, yellow split peas, mint leaves, spices

Pomegranate soup (Note: Persian: آش انار, romanized: Āsh-e-anār; Tajik: Оши анор; Azerbaijani: انار آشی, romanized: Anar aşı; Mazanderani: اسپاش انار او, romanized: Aspāsh enār ow; Arabic: شوربة رمان, romanized: Shōrbat rummān) is an Iranian dish made from pomegranate juice and seeds, yellow split peas, mint leaves, spices, and other ingredients. It is regarded as an āsh, which is the Iranian term for a "thick soup". This soup has different forms in Iran.

== See also ==
- List of soups
- Çorba
