= Khorasan, Kurdistan =

Khorasan خراسان
- Village
- Location within Iran
- Coordinates: 35°42′47″N 47°15′56″E
- Country: Iran
- Province: Kurdistan
- County: Bijar
- Bakhsh: Central
- Rural District: Najafabad

Population (2006)
  - Total: 105
- Time zone: UTC+3:30 (IRST)
  - Summer (DST): UTC+4:30 (IRDT)

Khorasan (Persian: خراسان, also Romanized as Khorāsān; also known as Khurāmān) is a village in Najafabad Rural District, in the Central District of Bijar County, Kurdistan Province, Iran. At the 2006 census, its population was 105, in 26 families. The village is populated by Kurds.
