= Spiced wine =

Spiced wine may refer to:

- Conditum, a family of spiced wines in ancient Roman and Byzantine cuisine
- Hippocras, a drink made from wine mixed with sugar and spices, usually including cinnamon, and possibly heated
- Mulled wine, a beverage usually made with red wine along with various mulling spices and raisins, served hot or warm
