= Puls (food) =

Ancient Roman pottage

- Place of origin: Ancient Rome
- Serving temperature: Hot
- Main ingredients: Farro, water, salt

Puls is a pottage made from farro grains boiled in water, flavoured with salt. It was a staple dish in the cuisine of Ancient Rome.

The dish was considered the aboriginal food of the Ancient Romans, and played a role in archaic religious rituals.

The basic grain pottage could be elaborated with vegetables, meat, cheese, or herbs to produce dishes similar to polenta or risotto.
