= Ancient Roman cuisine =

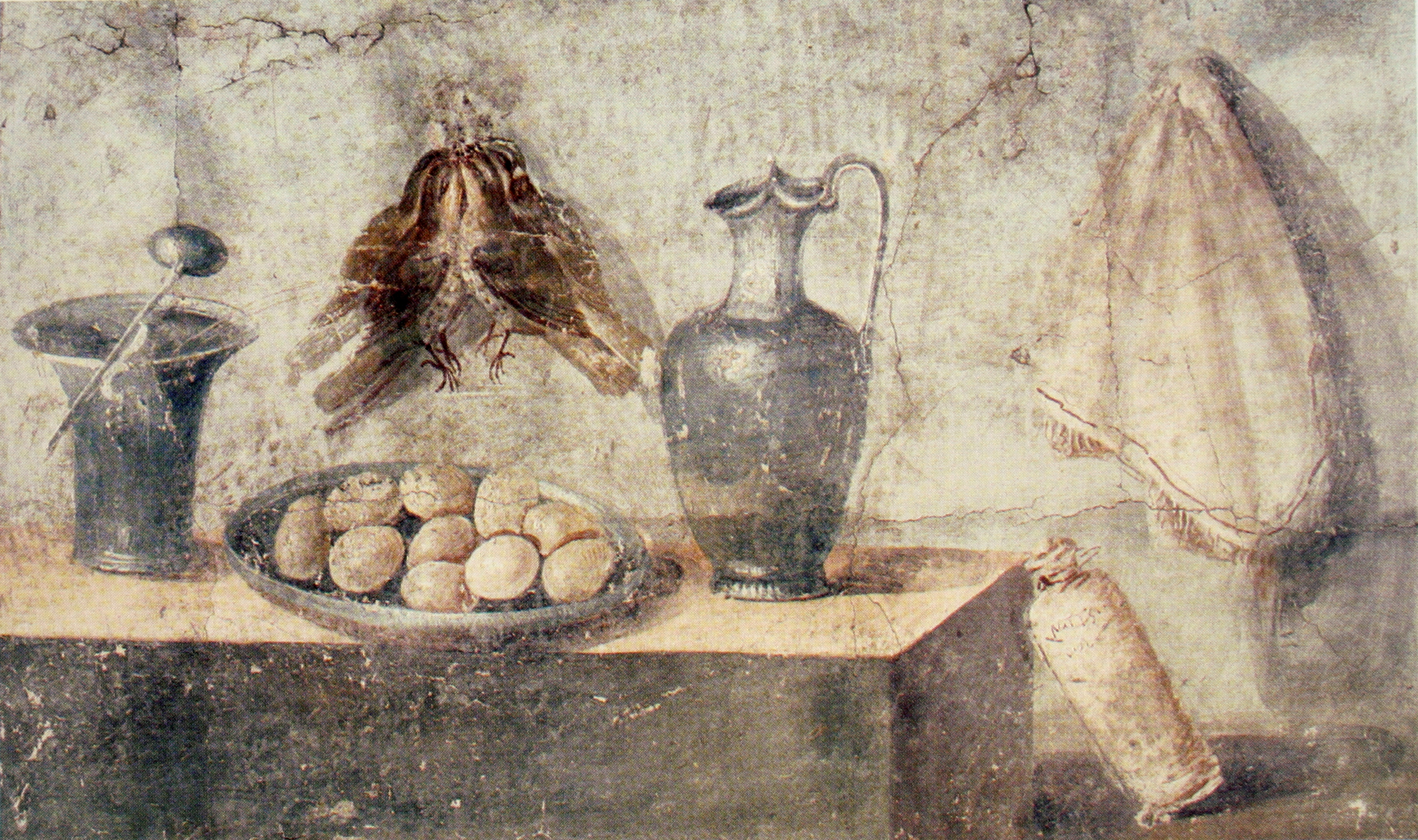
Ancient Rome painting depicting eggs, birds and bronze dishes found in the Roman House of Julia Felix

The cuisine of ancient Rome changed significantly over the duration of the civilization's existence. Dietary habits were affected by the political changes from kingdom to republic to empire, and Roman trading with foreigners along with the empire's enormous expansion exposed Romans to many new foods, provincial culinary habits and cooking methods.

In the beginning, dietary differences between Roman social classes were not great, but disparities developed with the empire's growth.

== Archaeology ==
Most organic foods decay under ordinary conditions, but ashes and animal bones offer some archaeological details about the ancient Roman diet. Phytoliths have been found at a cemetery in Tarragona, Spain. Imported figs were among the charred foods preserved when Boudica and her army burned down a Roman shop in Colchester. Chickpeas and bowls of fruit are known from Herculaneum, preserved since Vesuvius destroyed the town in 79 AD. Remains of small fish bones, sea urchin spines and mineralized plants have survived in the city's sewers; the plants archaeologists have identified include dill, coriander, flax, lentil, cabbage, opium poppy and various other nuts, fruits and legumes, as well as a diverse variety of fish and shellfish. At Pompeii, grapes, cheese, bread and pastry were burned and buried in peristyle courtyard gardens as offerings to household Lares.

== Meals ==
Traditionally, a breakfast called ientaculum was served at dawn. At mid-day to early afternoon, Romans ate cena, the main meal of the day, and at nightfall a light supper called vesperna. With the increased importation of foreign foods, the cena grew larger in size and included a wider range of foods. Thus, it gradually shifted to the evening, while the vesperna was abandoned completely over the course of the years. The mid-day meal prandium became a light meal to hold one over until cena. Among the lower classes of the Roman society, these changes were less pronounced as the traditional routines corresponded closely to the daily rhythms of manual labour.

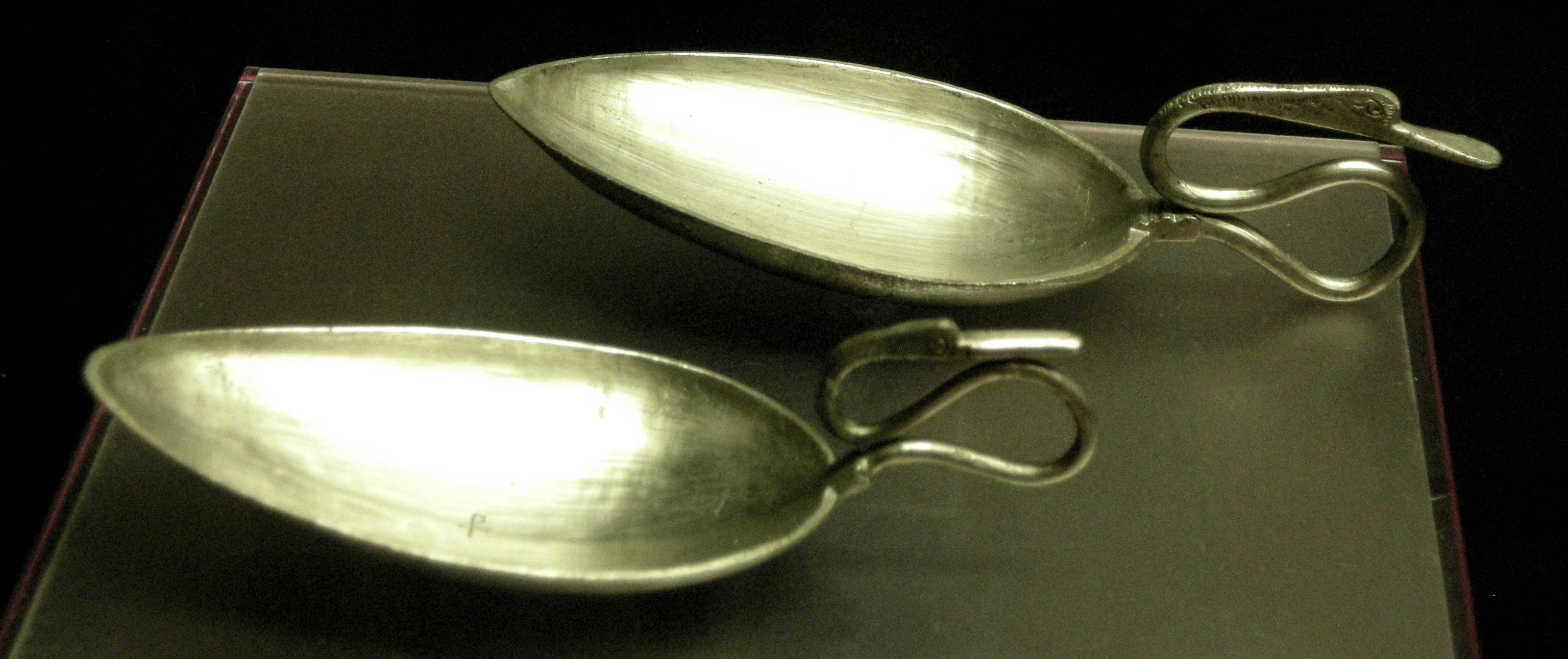
Roman spoons with duck or swan handles

However, among the upper classes, who normally did not engage in manual labour, it became customary to schedule all business obligations in the morning. After the prandium, the last responsibilities would be discharged, and a visit would be made to the baths. Around 2 p.m., the cena would begin. This meal could last until late in the night, especially if guests were invited, and would often be followed by comissatio, a round of alcoholic beverages (usually wine).

In the period of the kings and the early Republic, but also in later periods (for the working classes), the cena essentially consisted of a kind of porridge, the puls. The simplest kind would be made from emmer, water, salt and fat. A more sophisticated variation was made with olive oil, and consumed with an accompaniment of assorted vegetables when available. The wealthy commonly ate their puls with eggs, cheese, and honey and it was also occasionally served with meat or fish.

Over the course of the Republican period, the cena developed into two courses: the main course and a dessert with fruit and seafood (e.g. molluscs, shrimp). By the end of the Republic, it was usual for the meal to be served in three parts: an appetiser (gustatio), main course (primae mensae), and dessert (secundae mensae).

The Roman legions' staple ration of food was wheat. In the 4th century, most legionaries ate as well as anyone in Rome. They were supplied with rations of bread and vegetables along with meats such as beef, mutton, or pork. Rations also depended on where the legions were stationed or were campaigning. Mutton was popular in Northern Gaul and Britannia, but pork was the main meat ration of the legions.

== Foods and ingredients ==
The Roman colonies provided many foods to Rome; the city received ham from Belgium, oysters from Brittany, garum from Mauretania, wild game from Tunisia, silphium (laser) from Cyrenaica, flowers from Egypt, lettuce from Cappadocia, and fish from Pontus.

The ancient Roman diet included many items that are staples of modern Italian cooking. Pliny the Elder discussed more than 30 varieties of olive, 40 kinds of pear, figs (native and imported from Africa and the eastern provinces), and a wide variety of vegetables. (Note: Jacques André listed 54 cultivated and 43 wild vegetables in ancient Rome.) Some of these vegetables are no longer present in the modern world, while others have undergone significant changes. Carrots of different colours were consumed, but not in orange. Many kinds of vegetables were cultivated and consumed. These included celery, garlic, some flower bulbs, cabbage and other brassicas (such as kale and broccoli), lettuce, endive, onion, leek, asparagus, radishes, turnips, parsnips, carrots, beets, green peas, chard, field greens, cardoons, olives, and cucumber. Some vegetables were illustrated in reliefs.

However, some foods considered characteristic of modern Italian cuisine were not used. In particular, spinach and eggplant (aubergine) were introduced later from the Arab world, and tomatoes, potatoes, capsicum peppers, maize (the modern source of polenta) and beans of the Phaseolus genus Phaseolus vulgaris (green - French and runner, lima, kidney) only appeared in Europe following the discovery of the New World and the Columbian Exchange. The Romans knew of rice, but it was very rarely available to them. There were also few citrus fruits - lemons were known in Italy from the second century AD, but were not widely cultivated.

=== Breads and grains ===
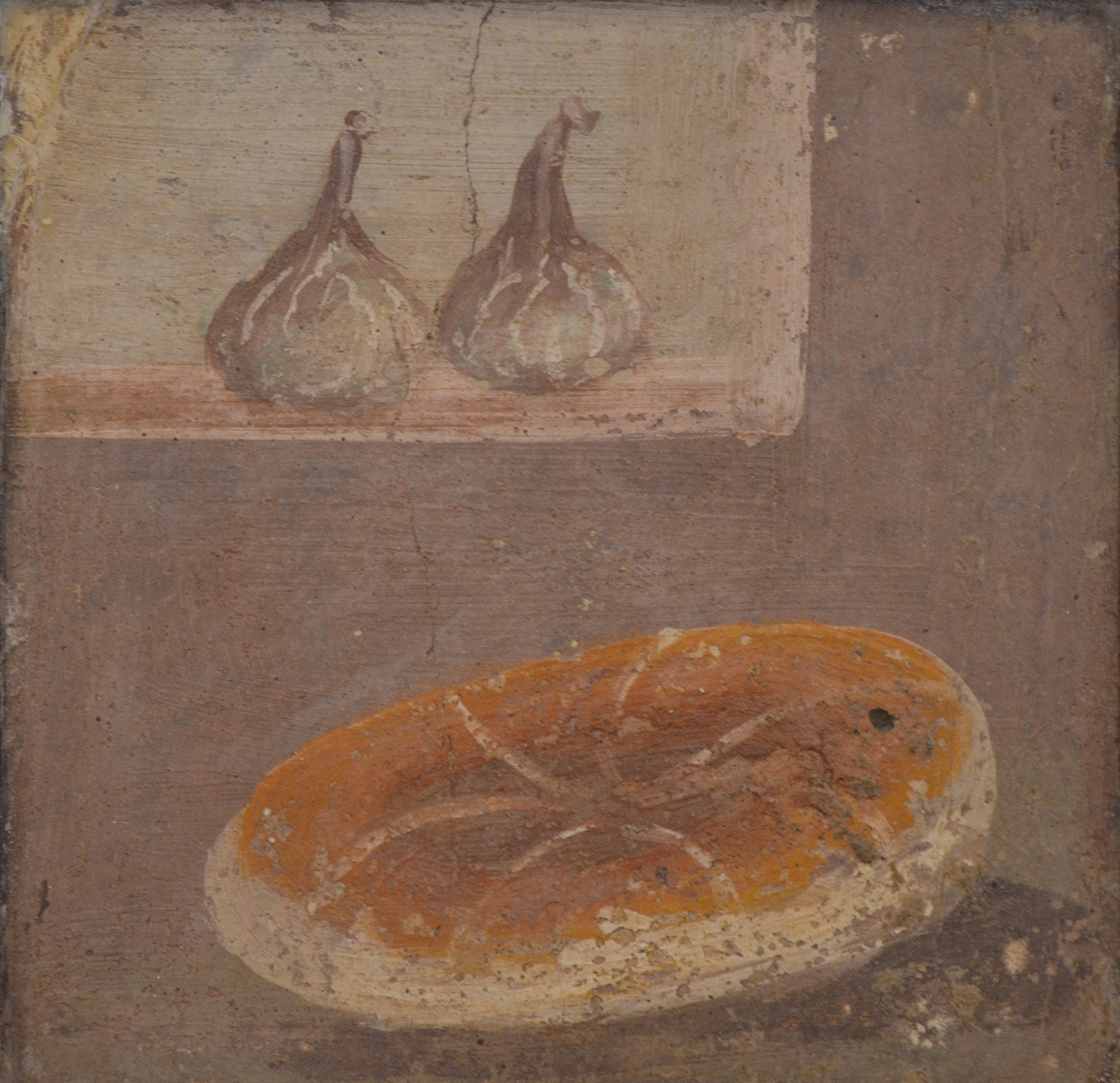
Fresco showing a piece of bread and two figs, from Pompeii, Naples National Archaeological Museum. Bread was a staple food in the Roman world.

From 123 BC, a ration of unmilled wheat (as much as 33 kg), known as the frumentatio, was distributed to as many as 200,000 people every month by the Roman state. There was originally a charge for this but from 58 BC this charge was abolished by the plebeian tribune Publius Clodius Pulcher. Individuals had to be citizens and domiciled in Rome to receive the frumentatio.

Originally flat, round loaves made of emmer (a species of wheat) with a bit of salt were eaten; among the upper classes, eggs, cheese, and honey, along with milk and fruit were also consumed. In the Imperial period, around 1 AD, bread made of wheat was introduced; with time, more and more wheaten foods began to replace emmer loaves. There were many kinds of bread of differing quality. Typically white bread was baked for the elite, with darker bread baked for the middle class, and the darkest bread for the poor peasants. The bread was sometimes dipped in wine and eaten with olives, cheese, and grapes. At the time of the destruction of Pompeii in AD 79, there were at least 33 bakeries in that city. Roman chefs made sweet buns flavored with blackcurrants and cheese cakes made with flour, honey, eggs, ricotta-like cheese and poppy seed. Sweet wine cakes were made with honey, reduced red wine and cinnamon. Fruit tarts were popular with the upper class, but the lower classes couldn't afford to personally make them or purchase them from markets and vendors.

Juscellum was a broth with grated bread, eggs, sage and saffron, described in Apicius, a Roman recipe book of the late 4th or early 5th century.

=== Meat ===
Butcher's meat was an uncommon luxury. The most popular meat was pork, especially sausages. Beef was uncommon in ancient Rome, being more common in ancient Greece—it is not mentioned by Juvenal or Horace. Seafood, game, and poultry, including ducks and geese, were more common. For instance, on his triumph, Caesar gave a public feast to 260,000 humiliores (poorer people) which featured all three of these foods, but no butcher's meat. John E. Stambaugh writes that meat "was scarce except at sacrifices and the dinner parties of the rich". Cows were prized for their milk; bulls as plough and draft animals. Meat of working animals was tough and unappetizing. Veal was eaten occasionally. Apicius gives only four recipes for beef but the same recipes call for lamb or pork as options. There is only one recipe for beef stew and another for veal scallopini.

Dormice were eaten and considered a delicacy. It was a status symbol among wealthy Romans, and some even had dormice weighed in front of dinner guests. A sumptuary law enacted under Marcus Aemilius Scaurus forbade the eating of dormice, but failed to stop the practice.

=== Fish and seafood ===
Fish was more common than meat. Aquaculture was sophisticated, with large-scale industries devoted to oyster farming. The Romans also engaged in snail farming and oak grub farming. Some fish were greatly esteemed and fetched high prices, such as mullet raised in the fishery at Cosa, and "elaborate means were invented to assure its freshness".

=== Fruit ===
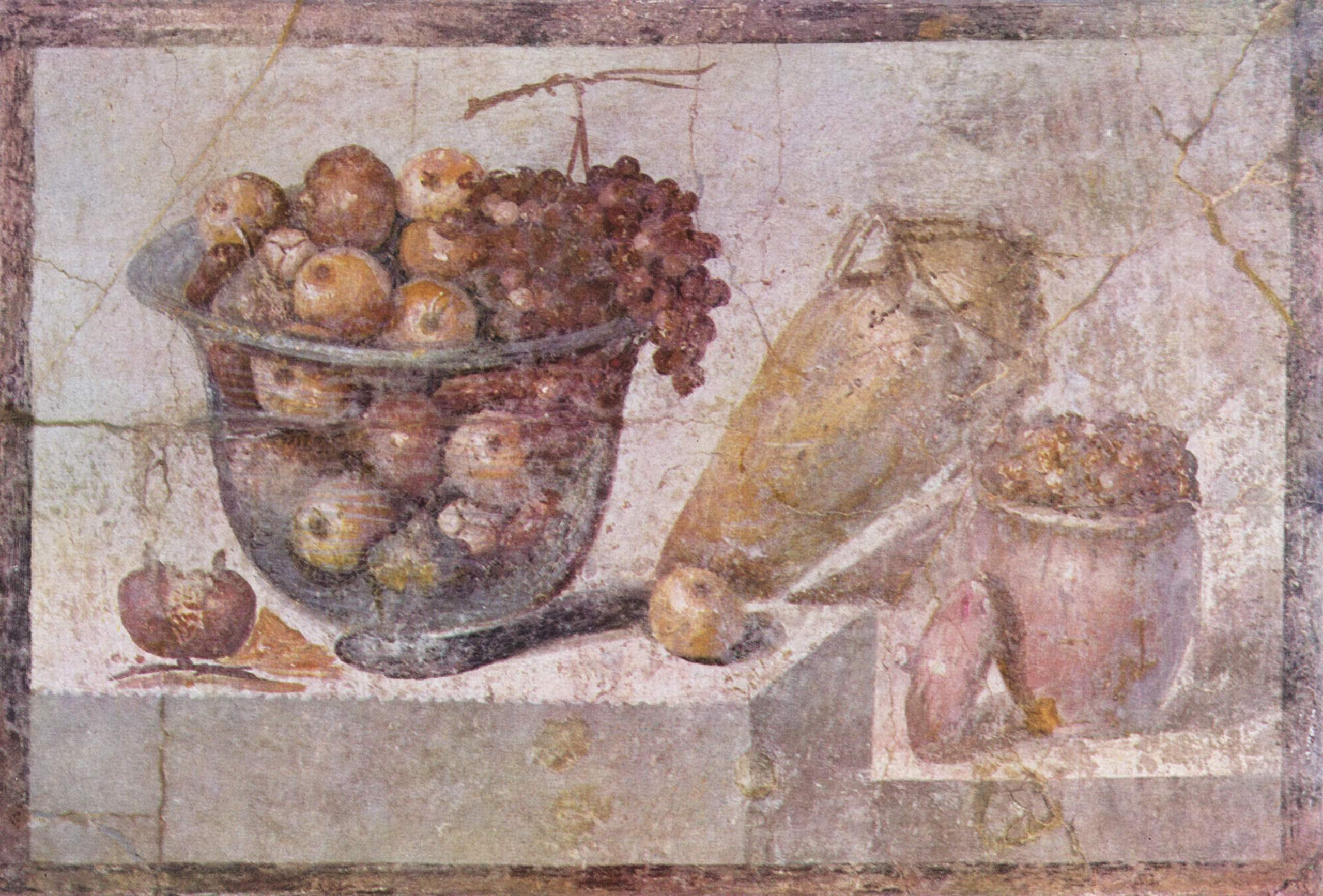
A still life with fruit basket and vases (Pompeii, c. AD 70)

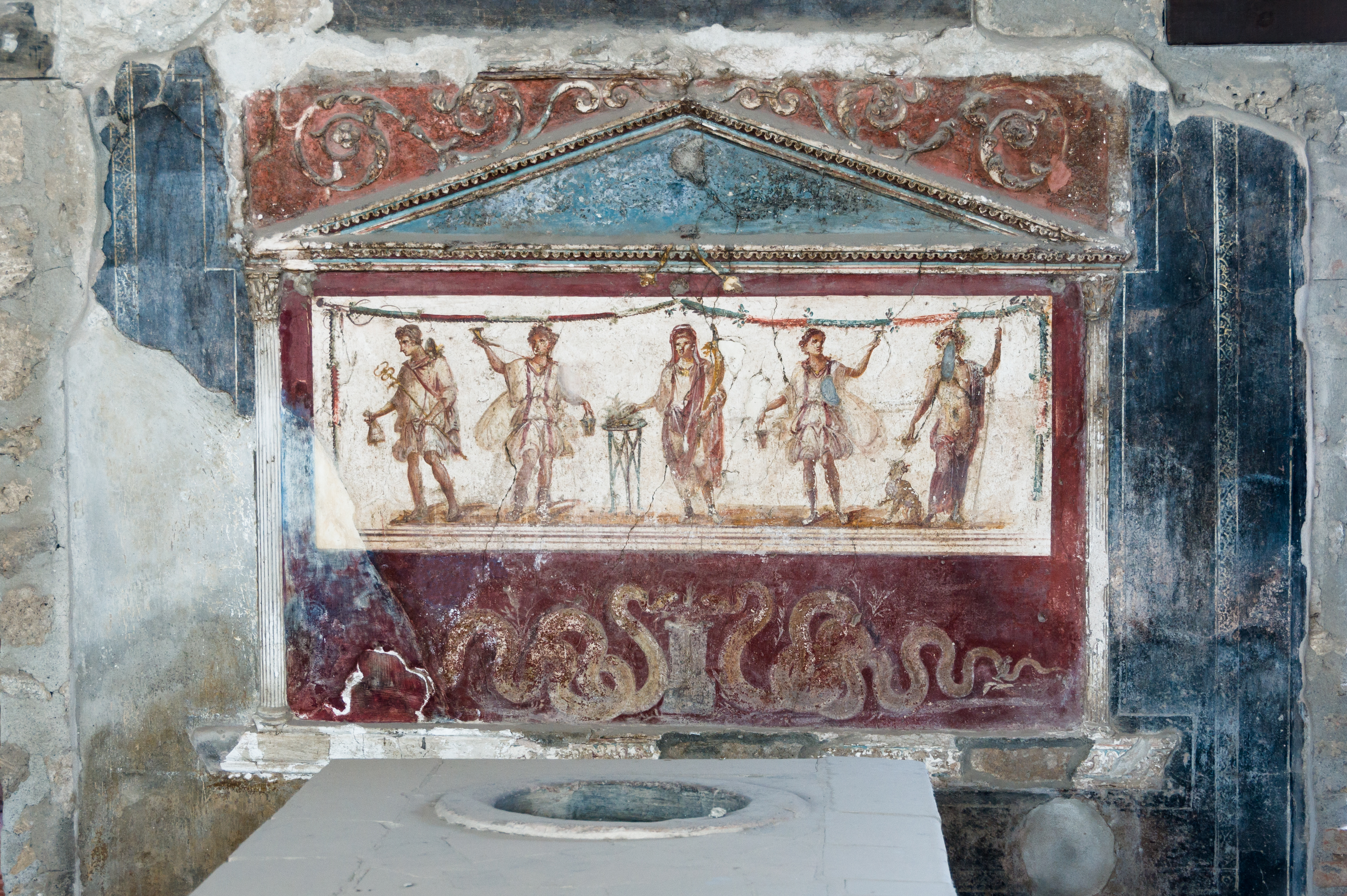
The thermopolium (eatery) of Pompeii, Italy, 1st century AD.

Fruit was eaten fresh when in season, and dried or preserved over winter. Popular fruits included apples, pears, figs, grapes, quinces, citron, strawberries, blackberries, elderberries, currants, damson plums, dates, melons, rose hips and pomegranates. Less common fruits were the more exotic azeroles and medlars. Cherries and apricots, both introduced in the 1st century BC, were popular. Peaches were introduced in the 1st century AD from Persia. Oranges and lemons were known but used more for medicinal purposes than in cookery. Although known to the ancient Romans, lemons were not cultivated in Italy until the Principate. At least 35 cultivars of pear were grown in Rome, along with three types of apples. Cato described pear culture methods similar to modern techniques. There are recipes for pear and peach creams and milk puddings flavored with honey, pepper and a little garum.

Columella offers advice on the preservation of figs by crushing them into a paste with anise, fennel seed, cumin and toasted sesame to be wrapped in fig leaves.

=== Vegetables ===
While the precursors of Brussels sprouts, artichokes, peas, rutabaga, and possibly cauliflower probably existed in Roman times, the modern cultivated forms we think of were not developed until the late Middle Ages and early Renaissance times. Cabbage was eaten both raw (sometimes dipped in vinegar) and cooked. Cato greatly esteemed cabbage, believing it to be good for the digestion, and also (inaccurately) believed that if a sick person ate a great deal of cabbage and bathed in his own urine, he would recover.

=== Legumes ===
Legumes were limited to dried peas, fava beans (broad beans), chickpeas, lentils, and lupins. The Romans knew several varieties of chickpea, such as venus, ram, and punic. They were either cooked down into a broth or roasted as a snack. The Roman cookbook Apicius gives several recipes for chickpeas.

=== Nuts ===
The ancient Romans ate walnuts, almonds, pistachios, chestnuts, hazelnuts (filberts), pine nuts, and sesame seeds, which they sometimes pulverized to thicken spiced, sweet wine sauces for roast meat and fowl to serve on the side or over the meat as a glaze. Nuts were also used in savoury pesto-like sauces for cold cuts. Nuts were used in pastries, tarts and puddings sweetened with honey.

=== Dairy ===
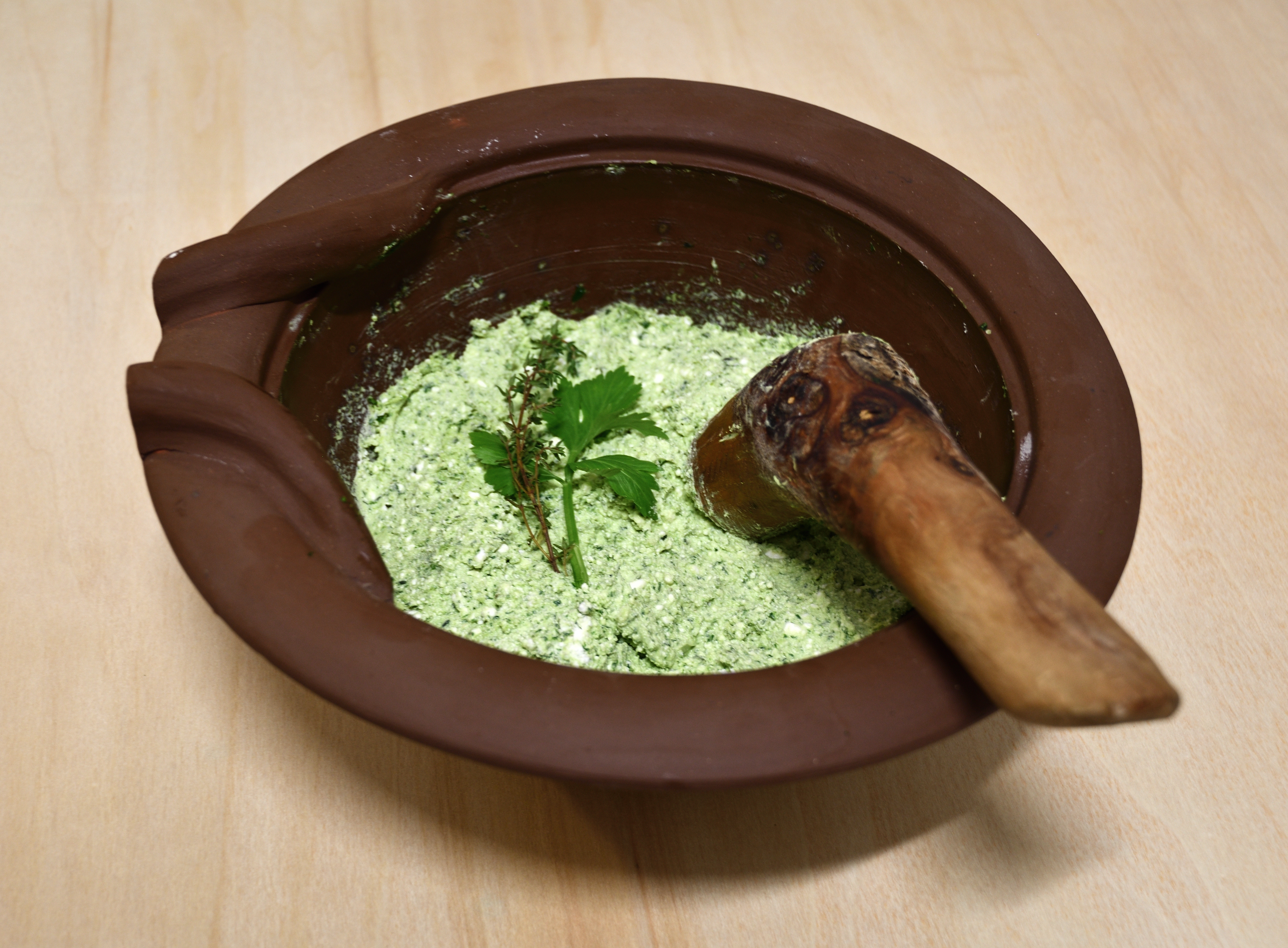
A re-creation of moretum, an herb and cheese spread eaten with bread

Cheese was eaten and its manufacture was well-established by the Roman Empire period. It was part of the standard rations for Roman soldiers and was popular among civilians as well. The Emperor Diocletian (284–305 CE) fixed maximum prices for cheese. The manufacture of cheese and its quality and culinary uses are mentioned by a number of Roman authors: Pliny the Elder described cheese's dietary and medicinal uses in Book 28 of Historia Naturalis, and Varro in De Agricultura described the Roman cheesemaking season (spring and summer) and compared soft, new cheeses with drier, aged cheeses. The most extensive description of Roman cheese-making comes from Columella, from his treatise on Roman agriculture, De Re Rustica.

=== Condiments ===
Garum was the distinctive fish sauce of ancient Rome. It was used as a seasoning, in place of salt; as a table condiment; and as a sauce. There were four major fish sauce types: garum, liquamen, muria, and allec. It was made in different qualities, from fish such as tuna, mullet, and sea bass. It could be flavored, for example mixed with wine, or diluted with water (hydrogarum), a form popular among Roman soldiers, although the emperor Elagabalus asserted that he was the first to serve it at public banquets in Rome. The most costly garum was garum sociorum, made from mackerel (scomber) at the New Carthage fisheries in Spain, and widely traded. Pliny wrote in his Natural History that two congii (7 litres) of this sauce cost 1,000 sesterces. One thousand sesterces in the Early Empire was equal to 110 g of gold.

== Cooking ==
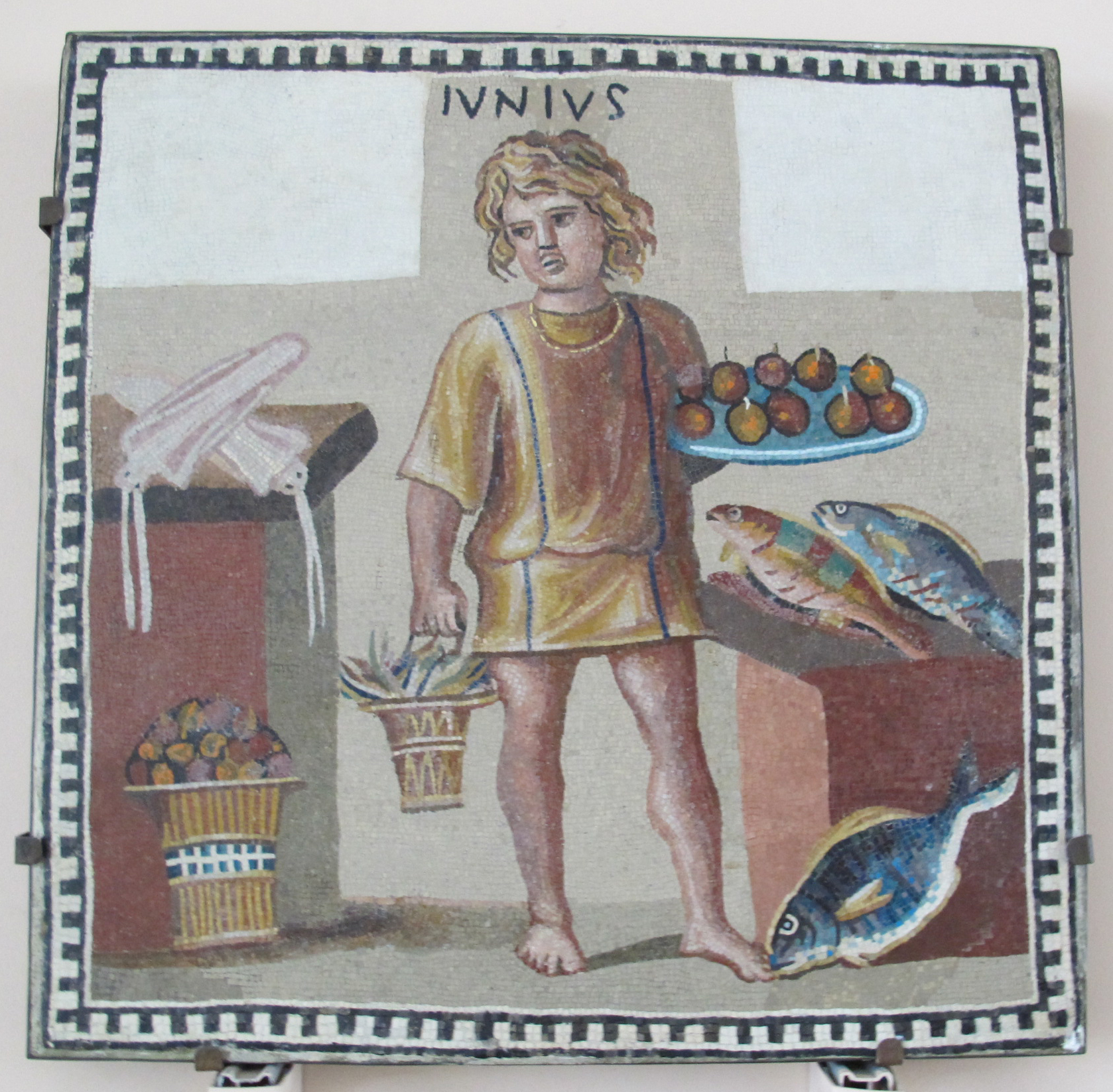
A boy holding a platter of fruits and what may be a bucket of crabs, in a kitchen with fish and squid, on the June panel from a mosaic depicting the months (3rd century)

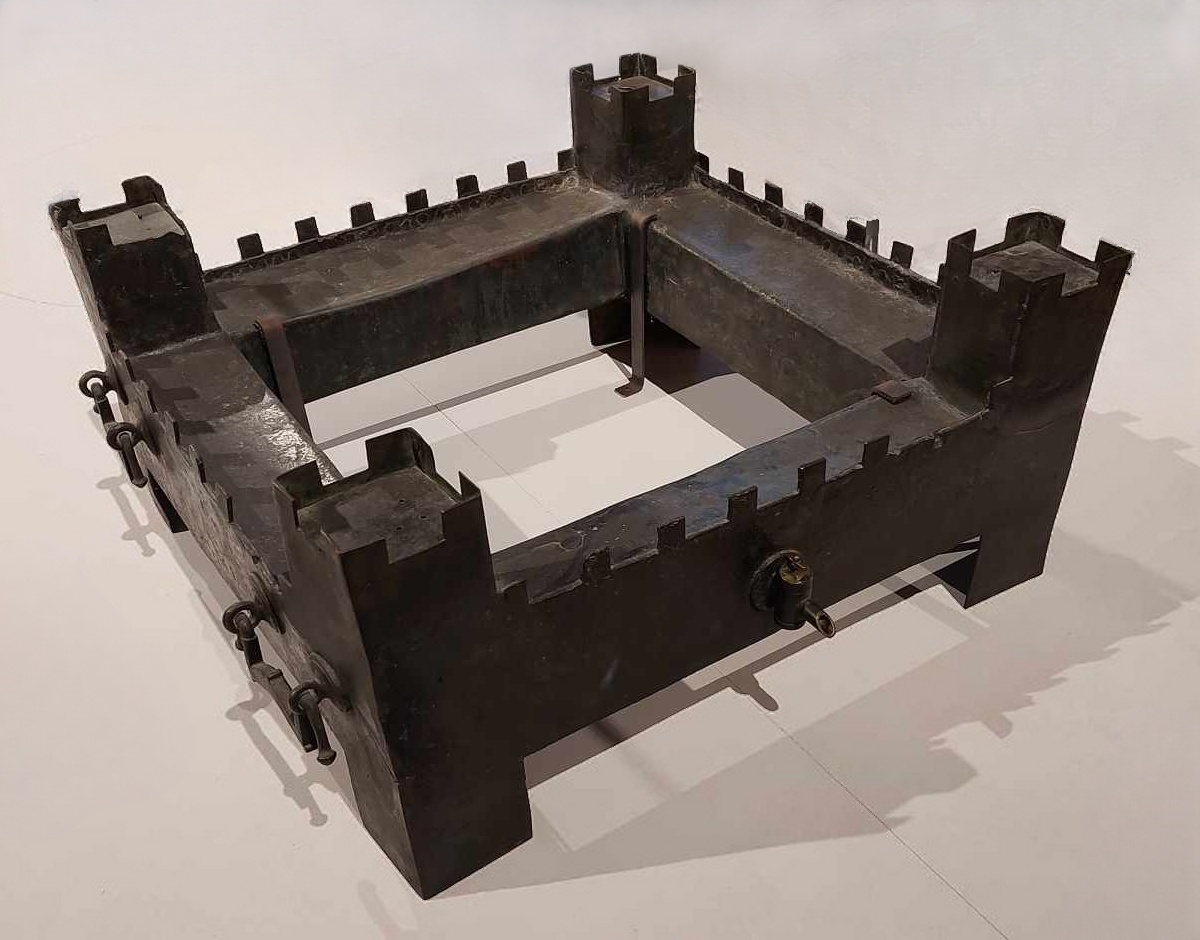
This Roman kettle was made in the shape of a fortress adding a reference to military life to an everyday object.

One of many modes of cooking in ancient Rome was the focus, a hearth that was placed in front of the lararium, the household altar which contained small sculptures of the household deity (the lares, or guardian ancestor-spirits, and the penates, who were believed to protect the floor, the larder). In homes where the lararium was built into the wall, the focus was sometimes built of raised brick into four sides, constructed against a baseboard on which a fire was lit. More common was a focus that was rectangular and portable, consisting simply of a moveable hearth with stone or bronze feet. After the development of separate kitchens, the focus began to be used only for religious offerings and for warmth, rather than for cooking.

Portable stoves and ovens were used by the Romans, and some had water pots and grills laid onto them. At Pompeii, most houses had separate kitchens, most fairly small, but a few large; the Villa of the Mysteries covers a nine-by-twelve meter area. A number of kitchens at Pompeii had no roofs, resembling courtyards more than ordinary rooms; this allowed smoke to ventilate. Kitchens that did have roofs must have been extremely smokey, since the only ventilation would come from high windows or holes in the ceiling; while the Romans built chimneys for their bakeries and smithies, they were unknown in private dwellings until about the 12th century A.D, well after the collapse of Roman civilization.

Many Roman kitchens had an oven (furnus or fornax), and some (such as the kitchen of the Villa of the Mysteries) had two. A square or dome-shaped construction of brick or stone, these ovens had a flat floor, often of granite and sometimes lava, which were filled with dry twigs and then lit. On the walls of kitchens were hooks and chains for hanging cooking equipment, including various pots and pans, knives, meat forks, sieves, graters, spits, tongs, cheese-slicers, nutcrackers, jugs for measuring, and pâté moulds.

== Alcoholic drinks ==
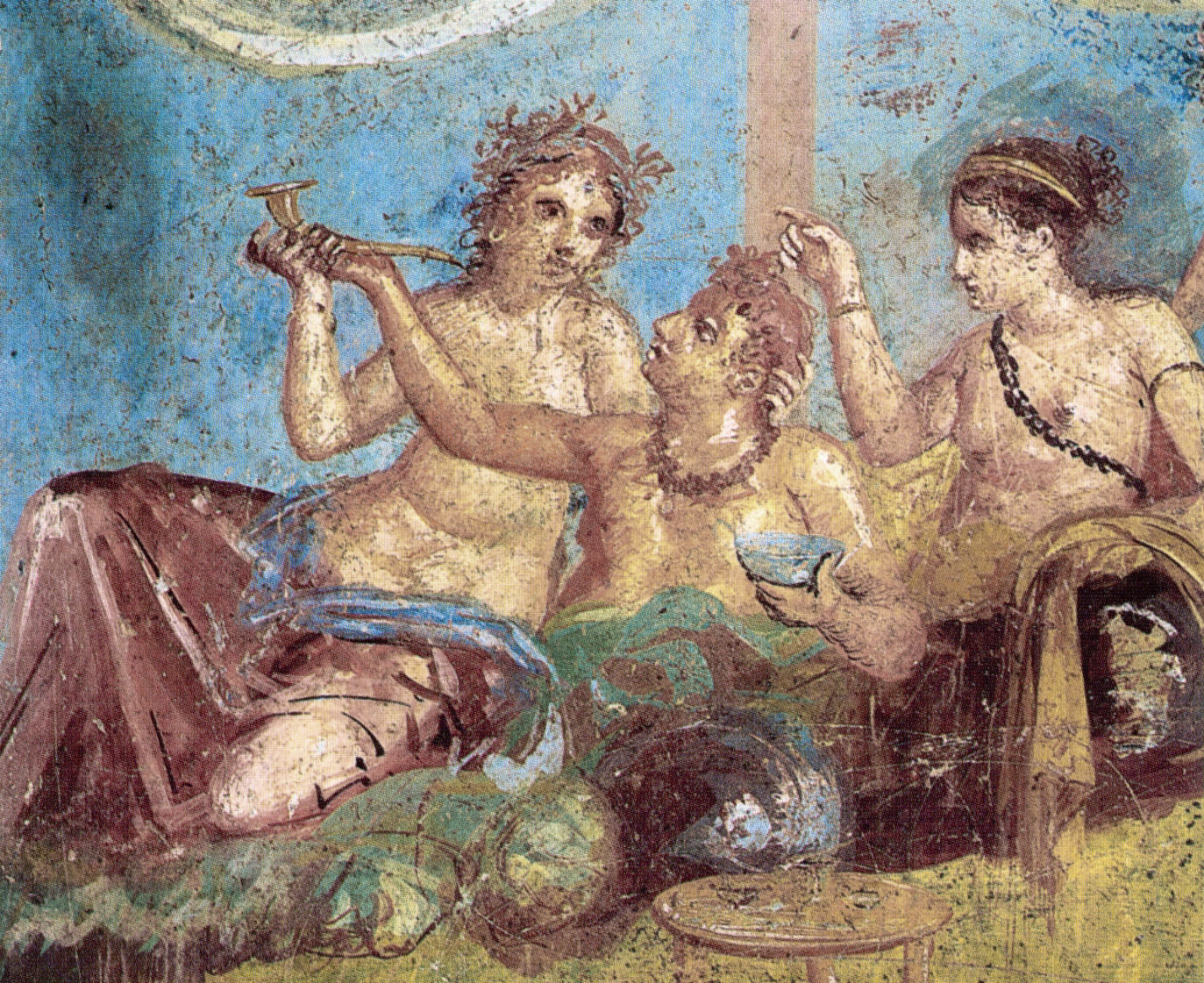
Roman fresco with a banquet scene from the Casa dei Casti Amanti, Pompeii

In Ancient Rome, wine was normally mixed with water immediately before drinking, since the fermentation was not controlled and the alcohol concentration was high. Wine was sometimes adjusted and "improved" by its makers: instructions survive for making white wine from red and vice versa, as well as for rescuing wine that is turning to vinegar. Those instructions as well as detailed descriptions of Roman viticulture date back to 160 BC in the oldest surviving text written in Latin prose.

Wine was also variously flavored. For example, there was passum, a strong and sweet raisin wine, for which the earliest known recipe is of Carthaginian origin; mulsum, a freshly made mixture of wine and honey (called a pyment today); and conditum, a mixture of wine, honey and spices made in advance and matured. One specific recipe, Conditum Paradoxum, is for a mixture of wine, honey, pepper, laurel, dates, mastic, and saffron, cooked and stored for later use. Another recipe called for the addition of seawater, pitch and rosin to the wine. A Greek traveler reported that the beverage was apparently an acquired taste. Sour wine mixed with water and herbs (posca) was a popular drink for the lower classes and a staple part of the Roman soldier's ration.

Beer (cerevisia) was known but considered vulgar, and was associated with barbarians.

== Desserts ==
While lacking necessary ingredients commonly used in the modern era for sweets such as refined sugar or properly churned butter, ancient Rome had desserts to serve after they had completed their meals served with wine. The most renowned were large platters of various fruits picked fresh; some of the more exotic fruits that could not be grown in Rome were even shipped in from distant continents for the wealthy. Due to the lack of a sweetener such as sugar there was always a demand for the sweetest fruits available. Spira was a type of sweet pastry that was readily available during this time, made with a thin, cake-like crust sometimes containing fruit. Enkythoi is a common type of Greek pastry that was popular in Rome. It was softer, like a modern sponge cake.

== Nutrition ==
According to one 2011 analysis of the Roman cuisine, the prevalence of legumes and cereals in their diets would have provided them with large quantities of calories, protein, calcium, and iron. The author, the anthropologist Madeline Brown, proposes that the Romans most likely obtained vitamins A, C, and D from seasonally available fruits and vegetables, perhaps with some help from certain spices. However, Brown ultimately concludes that their diet was low in vitamin D, sodium, and sugar. The bioarcheologist Geoffrey Kron estimates that the average height of ancient Roman men from Italy was 168.3 centimetres (66.3 in), which surpasses the average height of premodern Italian military conscripts. For instance, young men born in 1856 and conscripted into the Italian military show an average height of 162.64 centimetres (64.03 in), which is much shorter than their Roman predecessors. According to the data collected by Kron, it took until 1956 for Italian conscripts—who had actually been born in 1936—to match the Romans in height. This data is, however, skewed significantly in favor of the more modern Italians, for it is based exclusively on young adult male conscripts, who were likely to have been at the peak of their physical fitness and to have been better nourished than the rest of the population. In contrast, the data regarding the Roman population was extracted by synthesizing the results of 49 different studies on the long bone length measurements of 927 different male skeletal samples from Roman cemeteries. Therefore, it is likely that the overall average heights for men in Italy did not truly catch up to that of the Romans for a few more years. On this basis, Kron concludes that Italians during the Roman period likely benefited from greater nutrition than most Europeans of the 19th century. However, the average height of the Roman men was less than that of Hellenistic Greek men, which was 171.9 centimetres (67.7 in), thereby suggesting some degree of malnutrition.

== See also ==
- Apicius, De Re Coquineria
- Ancient Greek cuisine
- Byzantine cuisine, Eastern Roman Empire
- Italian cuisine
- List of ancient dishes
- Spice use in Antiquity
- Asarotos Oikos
- Food in ancient Rome
