= Conditum =

Ancient Roman spiced wine

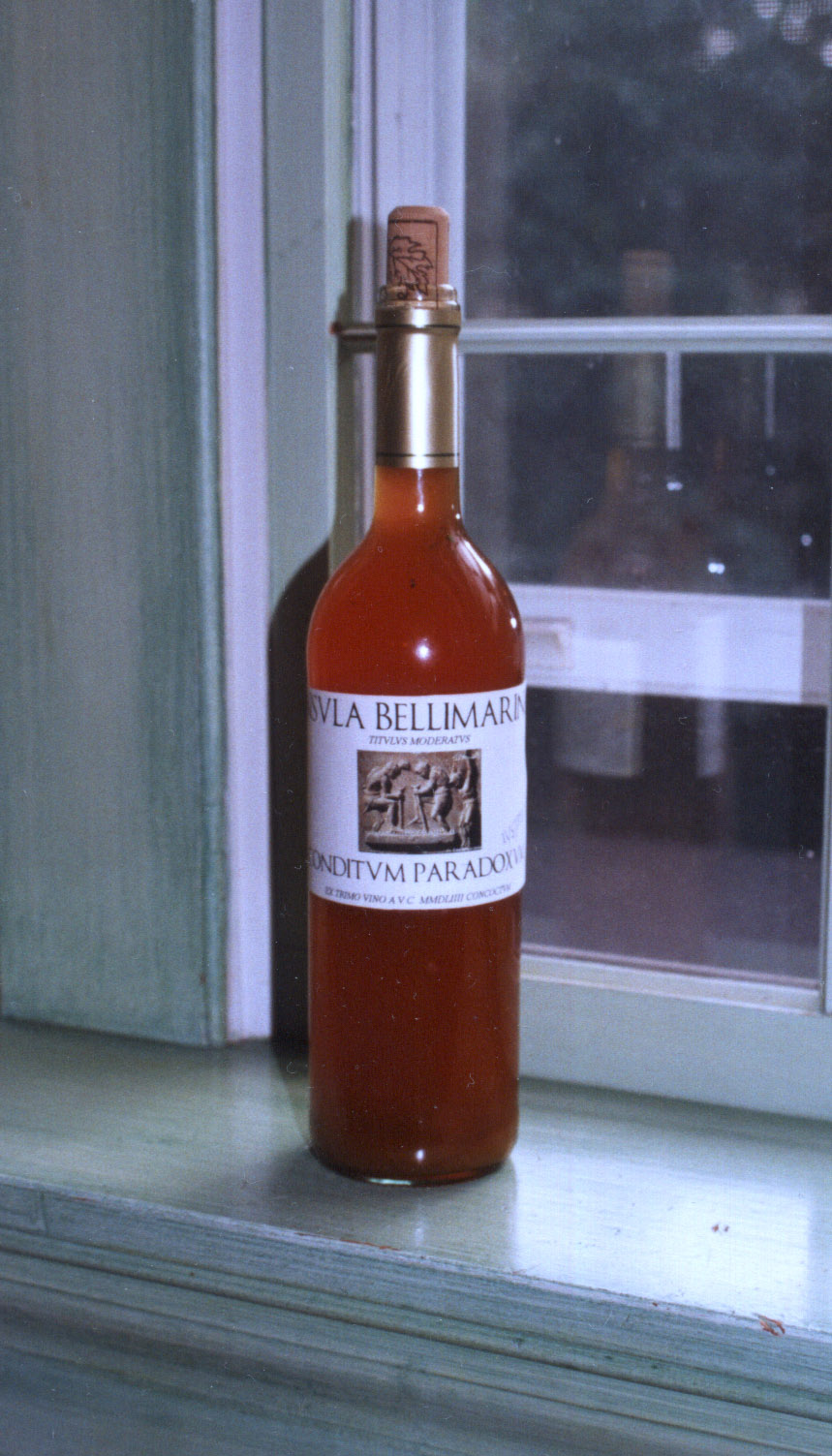
A modern bottle of Conditum Paradoxum

Conditum, piperatum, or konditon (κόνδιτον) is a family of spiced wines in ancient Roman and Byzantine cuisine.

The Latin name translates roughly as "spiced". Recipes for conditum viatorium (traveler's spiced wine) and conditum paradoxum (surprise spiced wine) are found in De re coquinaria. This conditum paradoxum includes wine, honey, pepper, mastic, laurel, saffron, date seeds and dates soaked in wine.

In the Levant of the 4th-century CE, the main ingredients of conditum were wine, honey and pepper corns. Conditum was considered to be a piquant wine.

A 10th-century redaction of an earlier Greek Byzantine agricultural work brings down the relative portions of each ingredient:

Let eight scruples (~10g) of pepper [corns] washed and dried and carefully pounded; one sextarius (~ 550ml) of Attic honey, and four or five sextarii (~2.5l)of old white wine, be mixed.

== See also ==
- Aromatised wine
- Caecuban wine

== Bibliography ==
- Andrew Dalby, Food in the Ancient World from A to Z, 2003 ISBN 0-415-23259-7
