= History of Auvergne =

Historic province in south central France

Historic coat of arms of the Auvergne.

Map of the extent of the Duchy of Auvergne.

The history of the Auvergne dates back to the early Middle Ages, when it was a historic province in south-central France. It was originally the feudal domain of the counts of Auvergne.

== History ==
Auvergne was a province of France deriving its name from the Arverni, a Gallic tribe who once occupied the area. In 52 BC, Arverni chieftain Vercingetorix mounted a fierce resistance against the military forces of Julius Caesar. Christianized by Saint Austremoine, Auvergne was quite prosperous during the Roman period. After a short time under the Visigoths, it was conquered by the Franks in 507.

During the earlier medieval period, Auvergne was a county within the duchy of Aquitaine and from time to time part of the "Angevin Empire". In 1225, King Louis VIII of France granted Poitou and Auvergne to his third son Alfonso. On Alfonso's death in 1271, Auvergne, along with the County of Toulouse, Poitou and the Comtat Venaissin, reverted to the royal domain.

The Middle Ages, especially the 10th to 13th centuries, were a period of great development for Auvergne, with the building of famous abbeys and churches in a Romanesque style. In 1095, the historic Council of Clermont was held there, to rally support for the First Crusade. Its wide autonomy was ended by King Philip II of France, who linked it to the royal possessions. Severely impacted by the Hundred Years' War, the religious wars and epidemics, integrated into the kingdom of France, it turned itself more and more into an agricultural province reputed for its products. In 1790, the historical province was divided into the modern-day départements of Puy-de-Dôme, Cantal, Haute-Loire, and Allier, although Haute-Loire and Allier also include some land from the historical provinces of Bourbonnais, Lyonnais, and Velay.

== Economic history ==
The region is famed for its charcuterie, which is celebrated in "La Mangona" festivals in many Auvergnat villages, for its cheeses (Saint-Nectaire, Bleu d'Auvergne, Cantal, Salers, Fourme d'Ambert), and for its mineral waters (Volvic, among others). Michelin tires are produced there. Auvergne is also the site of several major hydroelectric projects, mainly located on the rivers Dordogne, Cère, and Truyère. The region is also quite touristic, thanks to its landscapes.

== Cultural history ==
Auvergnat, a variety of the Occitan language, was historically spoken in the Auvergne. It is still spoken there.

Aubrac oxen, a rare breed, are raised in the Aubrac hills.

The Chaîne des Puys, a volcanic mountain range located in the Puy-de-Dôme department, was listed as a UNESCO World Heritage site in 2018.

Composer Joseph Canteloube based Chants d'Auvergne ("Songs of Auvergne") (1923–55), his well-known piece for voice and orchestra, on folk music and songs from the Auvergne.

Singer-songwriter Georges Brassens composed Chanson pour l'Auvergnat.

Composer Camille Saint-Saëns composed Rhapsodie d'Auvergne in 1884, based upon folk songs from the Auvergne.

Much of Anne Rice's Vampire Chronicles takes place in Auvergne. Characters Lestat de Lioncourt and Nicolas de Lenfent reside there.

The protagonist of John Jakes' The Kent Family Chronicles, Philippe Kent (né Charboneau), was born in Auvergne.

Rosalia, the famous Catalan-Spanish singer, was inspired by the Auvergnat's 13th century Romance of Flamenca to compose her 2018 album El mal querer.

== Notable residents ==
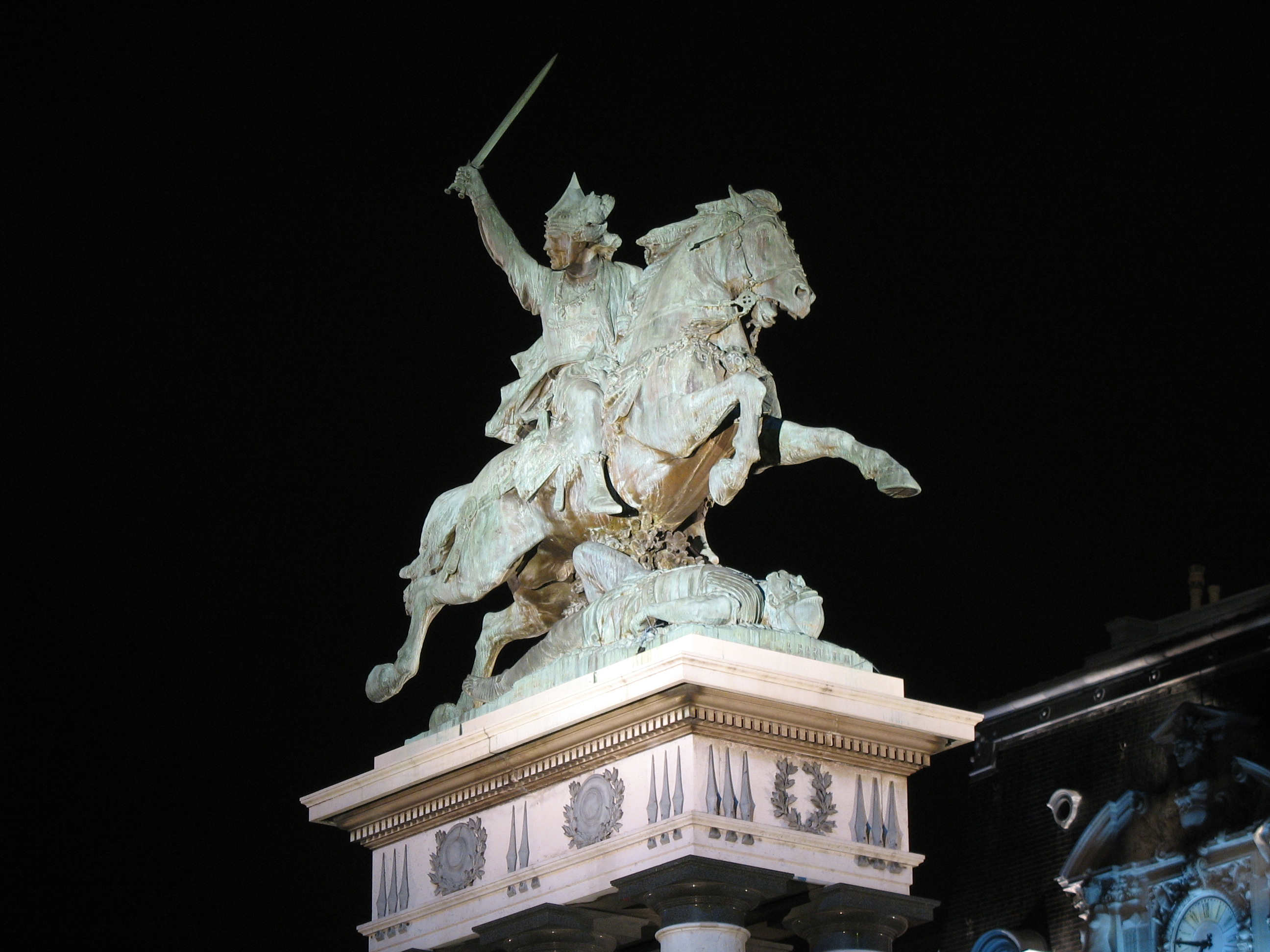
Statue of Vercingetorix in Clermont-Ferrand.

- Vercingetorix (c. 82–46 BC), King of the Arverni, leader of the Gallic resistance against Julius Caesar.
- Pope Sylvester II (c. 946–1003), born Gerbert of Aurillac, a significant player in the transition from the Carolingians to the Capetians.
- The Dalfi d'Alvernha or Dauphin d'Auvergne, troubadour and patron of troubadours, Count of Clermont and Montferrand
- Blaise Pascal (1623–1662), mathematician, inventor, Christian apologist (Pensées)
- Jean-Baptiste Carrier (1756–1794), French revolutionary, was born at Yolet in Auvergne. He was famous for his brutality towards his enemies. In 1794, he was guillotined upon conviction by the National Convention.
- Gilbert du Motier, marquis de La Fayette (1757–1834), born in Auvergne, was a national hero in both France and the United States for his roles in the American Revolutionary War and the French Revolution.
- Jean-Baptiste Coffinhal (1762–1794), Jacobin leader and vice-president of the Revolutionary Tribunal, was born in Auvergne. A close friend of Robespierre, he was executed following the events of 9 Thermidor.
- Joseph Canteloube (1879–1957), French composer.
- Pierre Laval (1883–1945), Prime Minister of France and of the Vichy French regime, was born near Clermont-Ferrand, although he made his political career in Paris.
- Valéry Giscard d'Estaing (1926–2020), President of France, although not born in the Auvergne, was educated in Clermont-Ferrand and represented it in the National Assembly.
- Guy Debord (1931–1994), writer and leader of the Situationist International, acquired a country house in the region in 1975, where he frequently lived until committing suicide there in 1994.
- Audrey Tautou (1976–), internationally successful French actress, was born and raised in Auvergne.
