= List of ancient dishes =

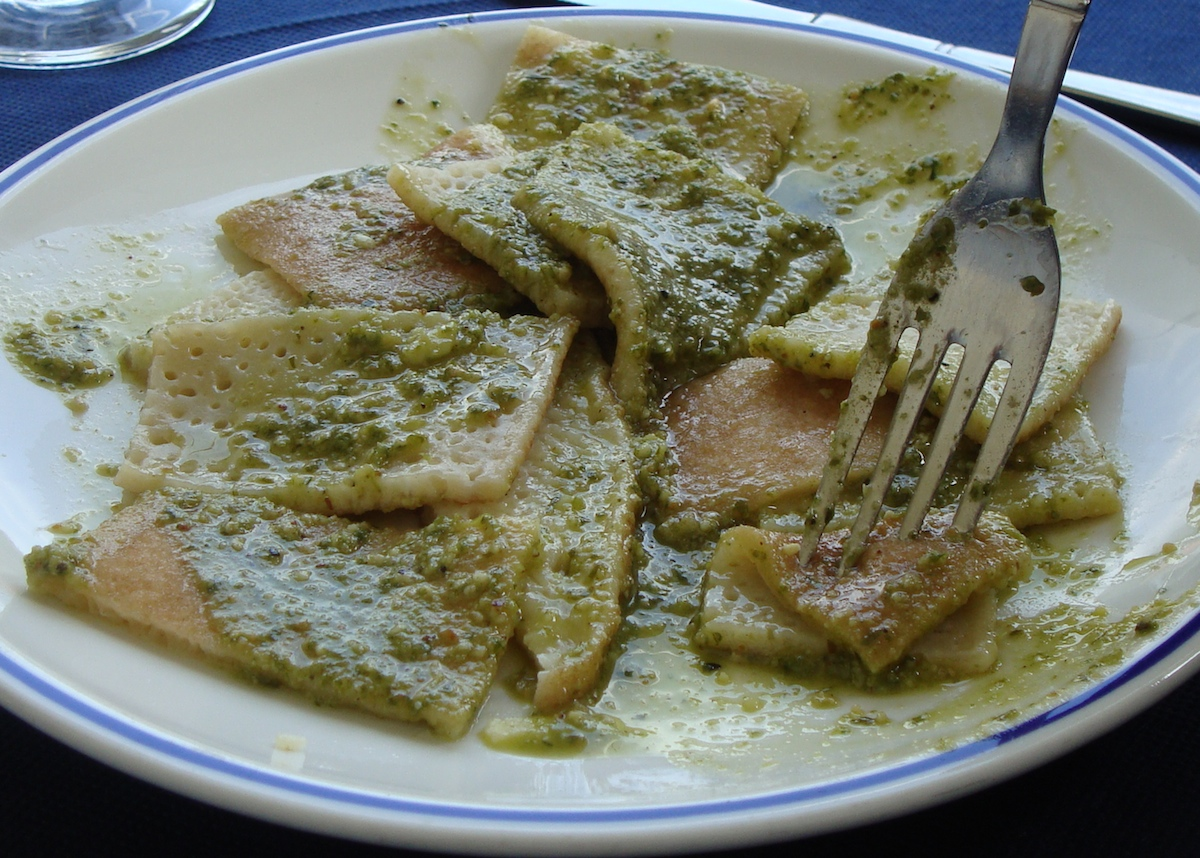
A plate of testaroli, an ancient dish, served with pesto at a trattoria in Pontremoli, Italy

This is a list of dishes, prepared foods and beverages that have been recorded as originating before the post-classical era.

Different endpoints exist for what marks the beginning of the post-classical era, including the Early Middle Ages (the end of the 4th century CE), the fall of the Western Roman Empire in 476 CE, the closure of the Platonic Academy in 529 CE, the death of the emperor Justinian I in 565 CE, the spread of Islam in 610 CE or the rise of Charlemagne.

Archeologists and food historians have recreated some dishes using ancient recipes.

== Obsolete ==
=== Foods ===
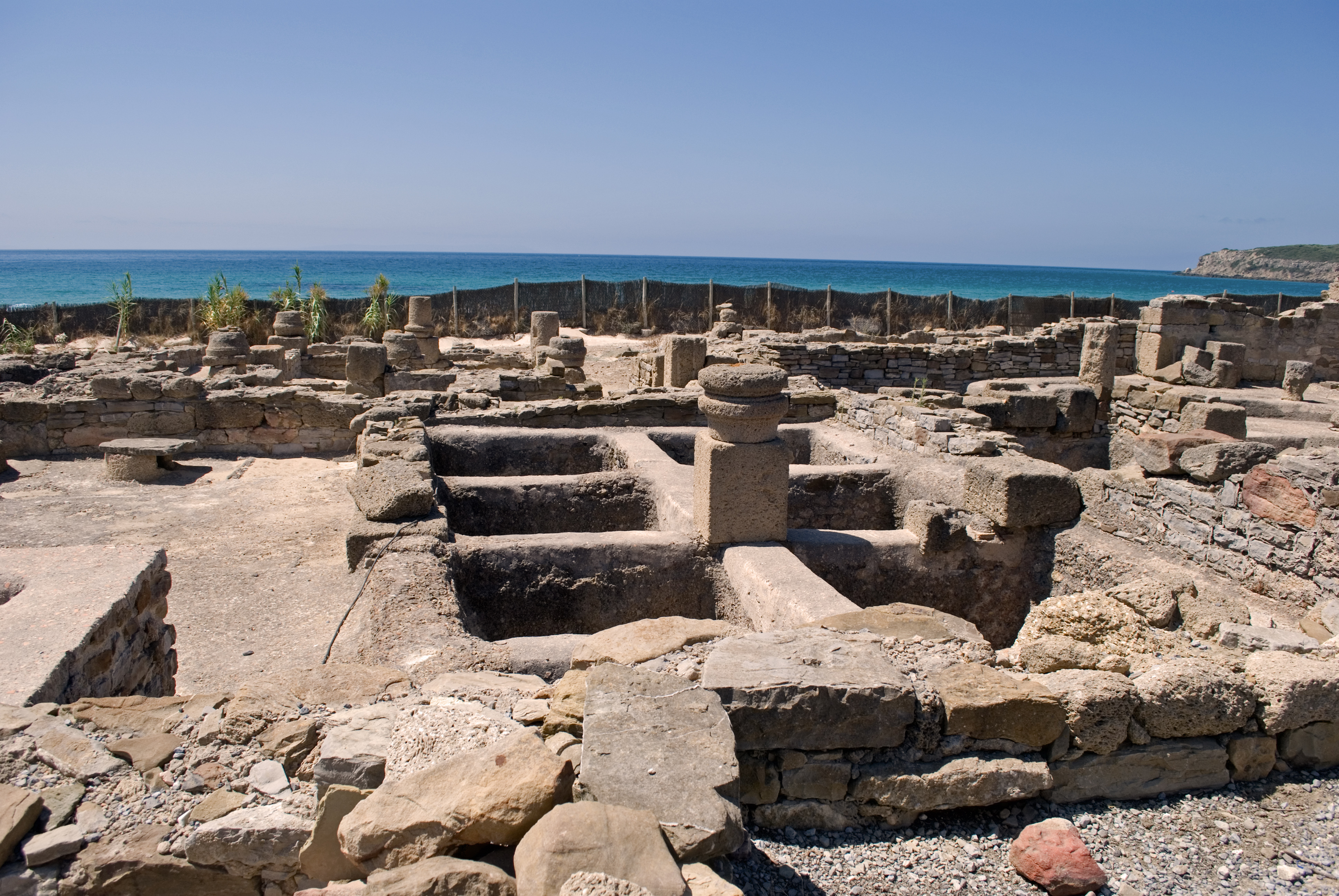
Ruins of a garum factory in Baelo Claudia, Spain

Some ancient foods are no longer eaten as a regular part of diets:

- Ashishim – Levantine red lentil pancake dish of Ancient Israelite origin that was commonly eaten by Jews in antiquity.
- Black soup
- Garum – Phoenicia, ancient Greece (where it was known as γάρος) and the Roman Empire, known from before Pompeii's destruction in 79 CE.
- Jusselle
- Kandaulos – Ancient Greek luxury dish
- Libum
- Liquamen, see garum
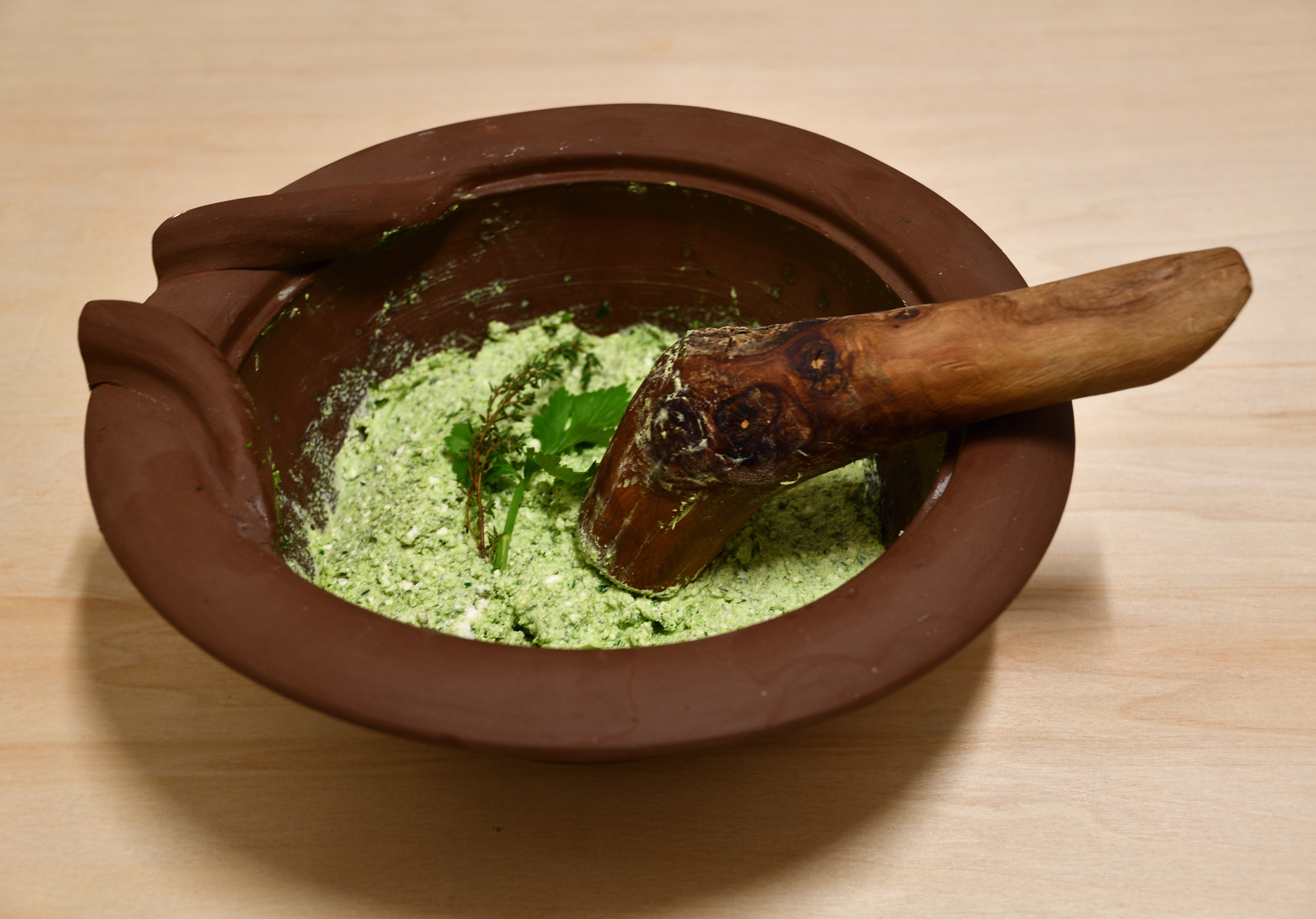
- Moretum
  Moretum – Herb cheese spread
- Myma – Ancient Greek meat dish
- Opus lactarium – documented as existing during the ancient Roman Empire
- Oxygala – a dairy product in ancient Greece and Rome. It was also consumed by ancient Persians.
- Placenta cake – a layered cake of pastry, cheese and honey originating in ancient Greece and Rome
- Puls – Ancient Roman pottage
- Silphium – used as a seasoning
- Tetrapharmacum
- Touloumotiri is an ancient cheese that is considered as the "forerunner to feta".
- Tracta was a kind of bread, pastry, or pancake in ancient Greece and perhaps Rome.

=== Beverages ===
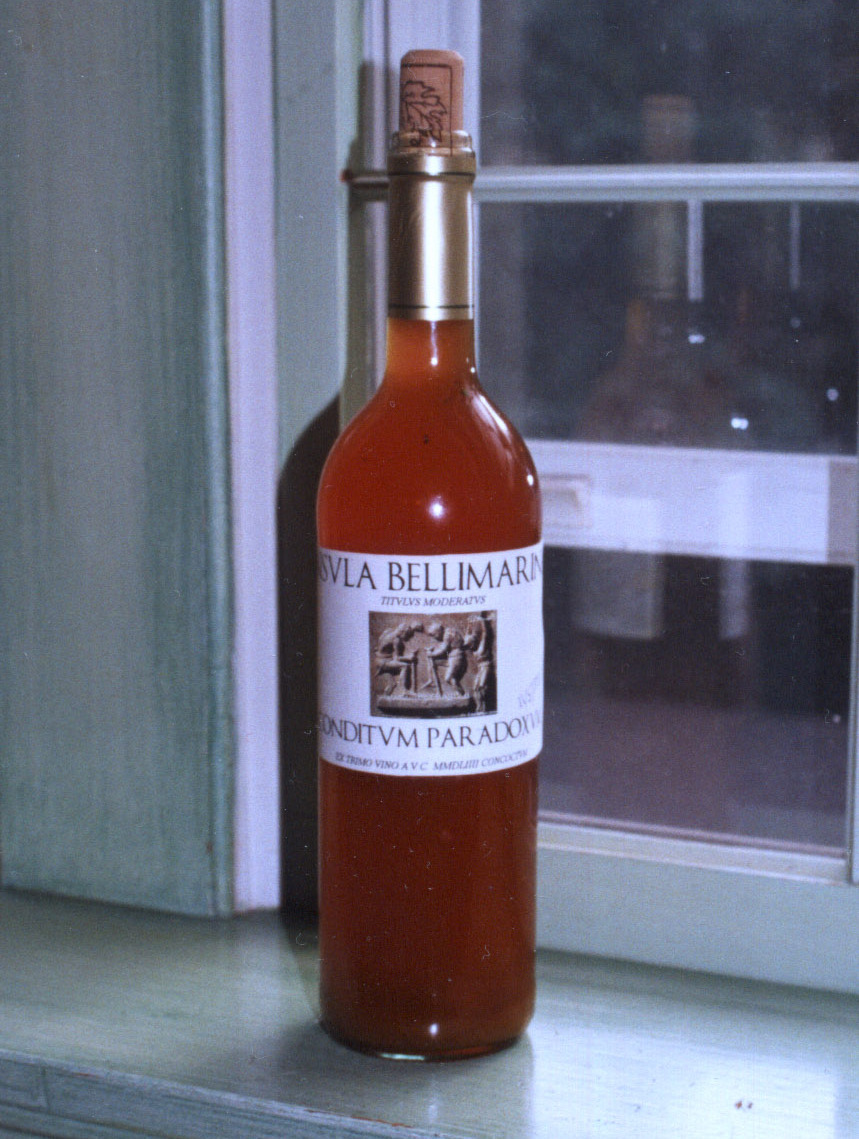
Conditum

- Alban wine – Wine of Ancient Rome from Colli Albani
- Caecuban wine
- Chian wine
- Coan wine – Grecian alcoholic beverage
- Conditum – Ancient Roman spiced wine
- Falernian wine – Variety of ancient Roman wine
- Gaza wine – Byzantine-period wine from southern Palestine, shipped from Gaza
- Kykeon was a common beverage of sustenance in ancient Greece, most often consisting mainly of a barley gruel mixture with various additives, sometimes written as having psychoactive properties associated with religious visions.
- Mulsum – Wine mixed with honey
- Oenomel
- Passum – Historical type of wine
- Posca – Ancient Roman drink
- Pulque – Alcoholic beverage made from agave
- Shedeh – Ancient Egyptian beverage
- Soma – Vedic ritual drink
- Vino Greco – Style name of Roman imitation of Greek wines
- Vinum Hadrianum – Wine from Atri
- Zythum – Ancient Egyptian beer variety

== Still consumed ==
=== Food ===
Some ancient foods continue to be eaten:

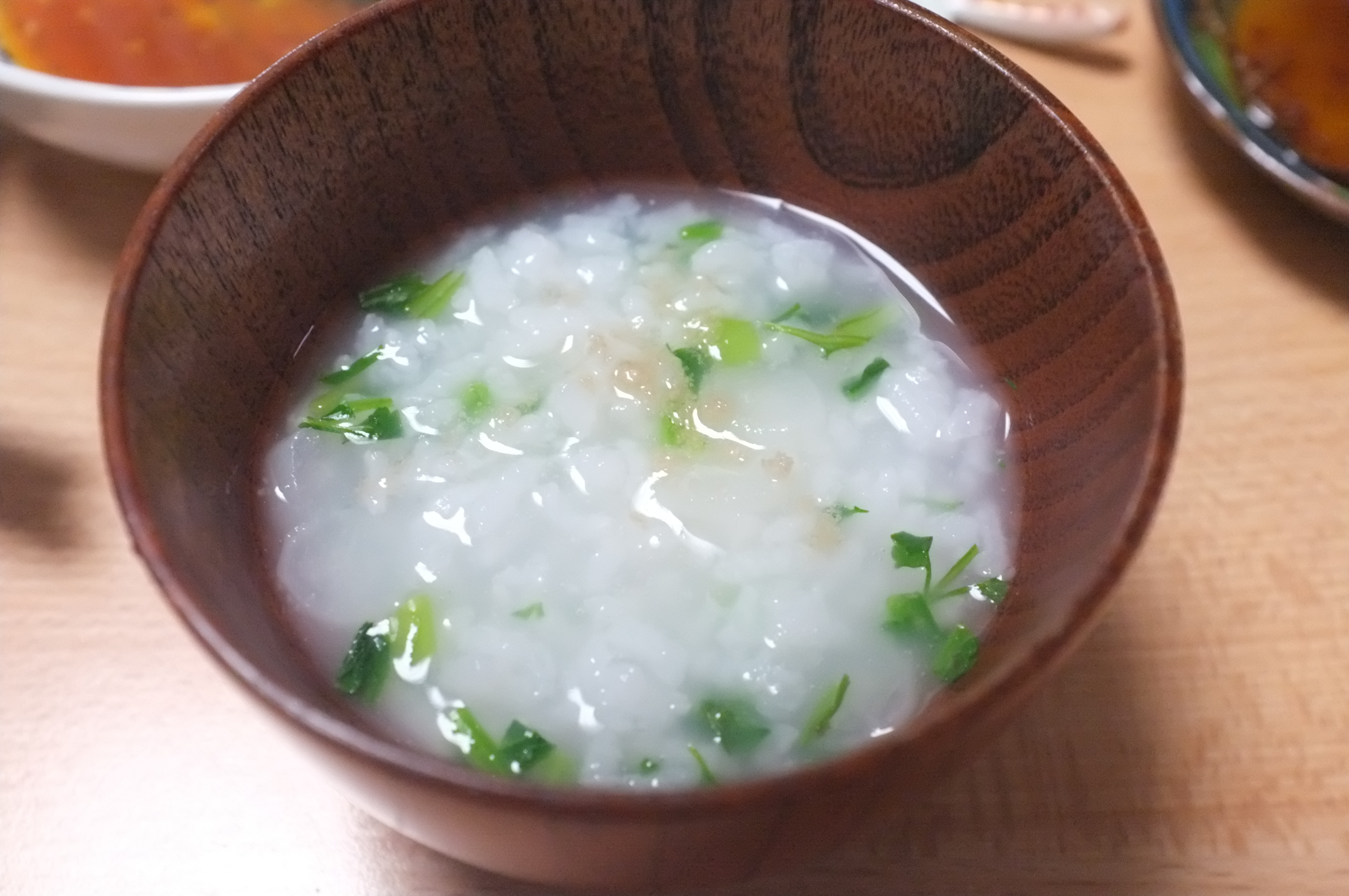
Congee

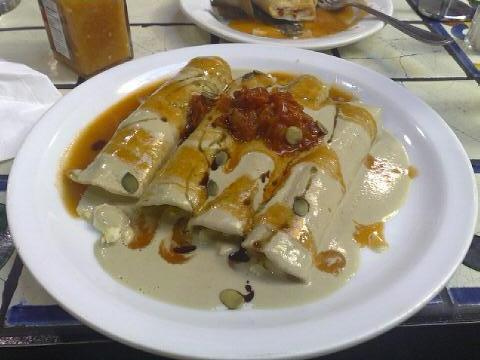
Papadzules may be "one of the most ancient traditional dishes of Yucatán, Mexico."

- Bread
  - Flatbread
- Chutney
- Congee
- Fig-cake (develah) – eaten by Jews in antiquity, mentioned in the Hebrew Bible and in the Jerusalem Talmud
- Fish sauce, see garum
- French toast, earliest reference appears in 1st century Rome
- Forcemeat
- Ham – dry-cured ham has been produced since ancient times.
- Hardtack – versions using various grains date back to ancient Rome, and as far back as ancient Egypt.
- Jeok
- Lamb stew – Described in the Yale culinary tablets, ancient Babylonian tablets from 1700 BCE
- Lucanica – Roman Italy, mentioned by Cicero, 1st century BCE
- Maccu – fava bean soup eaten in Sicily during Roman times
- Mantou – dates to 307 BCE – 250 BCE
- Moustalevria – Traditional Greek kind of pudding
- Nettle stew – Evidence of consumption dates to around 1000 BCE at Must Farm, in Cambridgeshire, England.
- Noodles – existent since at least 2,000 BCE in Northwest China, the noodle was developed independently in ancient China and ancient Rome, and remained common in both areas "through the centuries".
- Oatcake – known to exist at least from Roman times in Britain.
- Olive, olive oil is at least known from the Eastern Mediterranean in the Bronze Age, c. 3000 BCE
- Papadzules – a common dish in Maya cuisine that may be "one of the most ancient traditional dishes of Yucatán, Mexico.

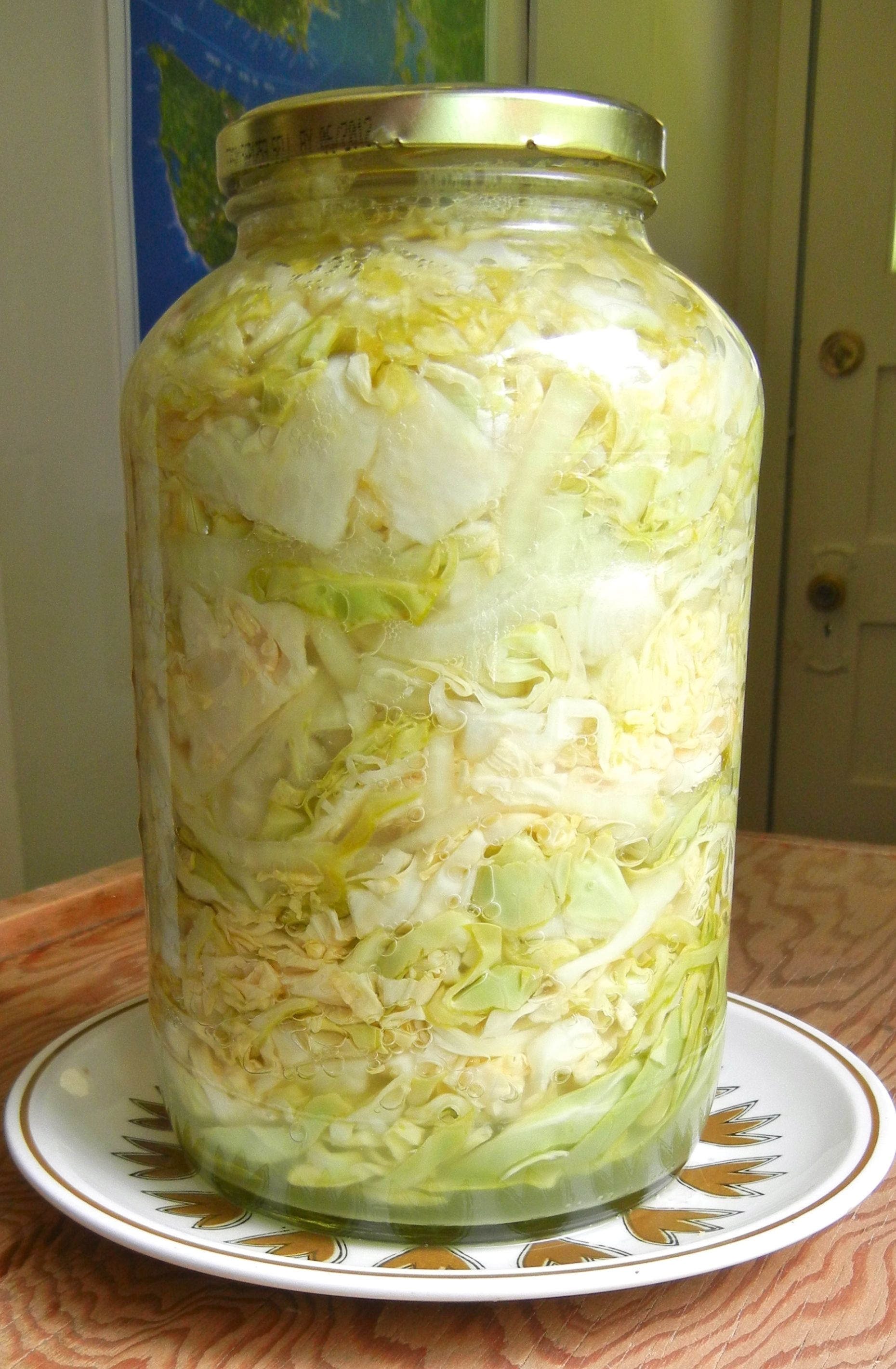
Sauerkraut

- Sauerkraut
- Sausage (Note: "The origin of sausage goes back to ancient times.")
- Sop
- Soup (Note: "An ancient food, soup is prepared by cooking meat, fish or vegetables and the like in such fluids as water or milk; it is then consumed as a liquid.")
  - Vegetable soup
- Soy sauce
- Tamale
- Testaroli
- Tharida
- Tofu
- Wonton
- Zongzi

=== Beverages ===
- Beer is recorded in the written history of Mesopotamia and ancient Egypt and is one of the world's oldest prepared beverages.
- Mead consumption's earliest surviving written record is possibly contained in the hymns of the Rigveda, one of the sacred books of the historical Vedic religion and (later) Hinduism dated around 1700–1100 BCE.
- Kombucha originated in what is now Northeastern China around 220 BCE
- Soy milk has been consumed in China since ancient times.
- Wine consumption and production has been found through archaeological evidence as early as c. 6000 BCE.

=== Dairy products ===
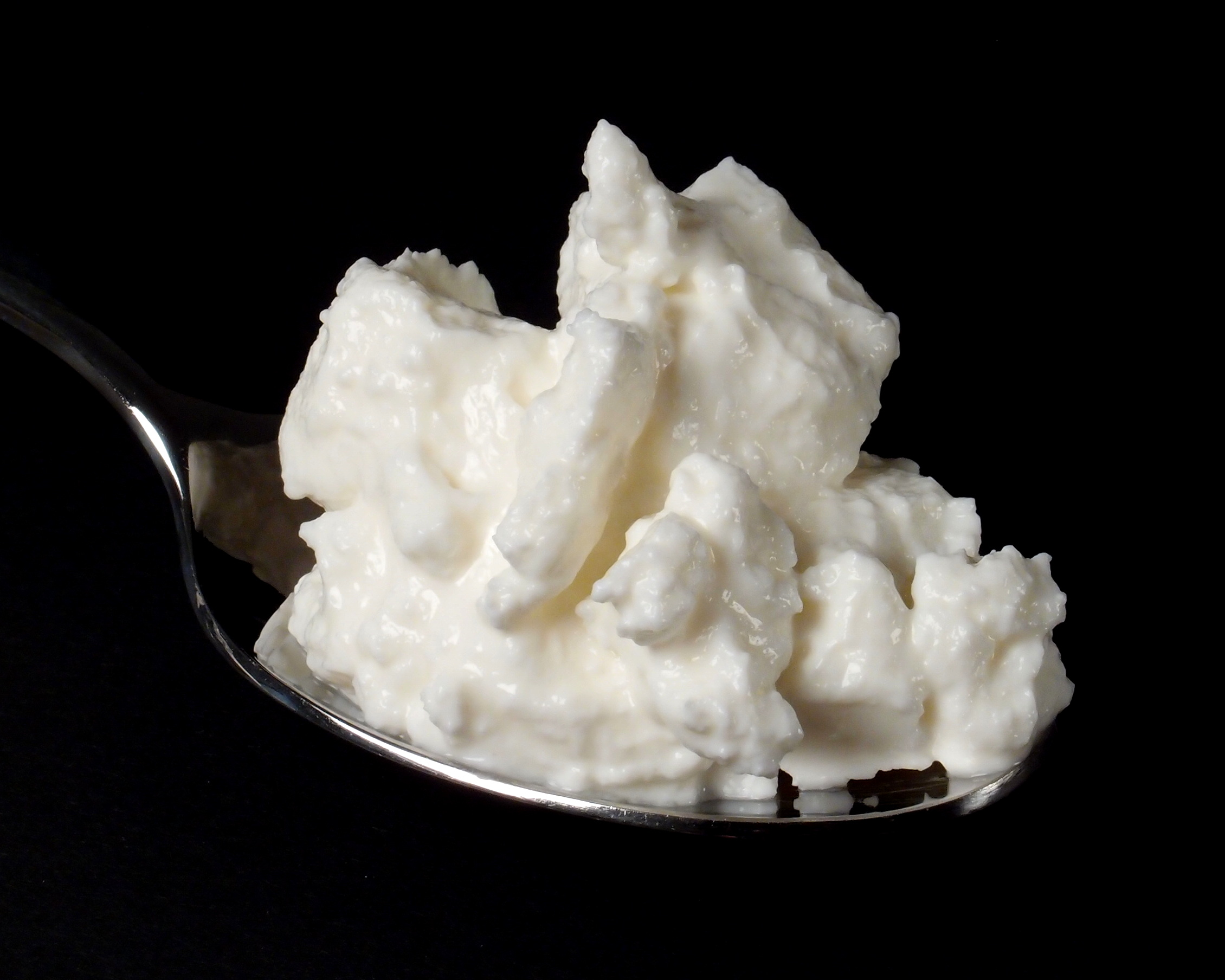
Quark

- Butter – documented as existent since at least 2,000 BCE
- Buttermilk – existed before 1 CE in ancient India
- Kumis – documented as existing in ancient Scythia
- Quark (lac concretum) – documented as existing in ancient Scythia
- Schiston – "separated milk" purported to have been invented by physicians during the time of the Ancient Roman Empire and Pliny the Elder It was prepared by boiling milk or whey along with pebbles.
- Shrikhand – documented as existing c. 800 to 300 BCE in ancient India
- Smy – thickened milk (Note: "Smy, or thickened milk, both human and animal, is often mentioned in medical prescriptions.") documented as existent in ancient Egypt
- Yogurt – documented in upper Mesopotamia from the Neolithic era.

==== Cheeses ====
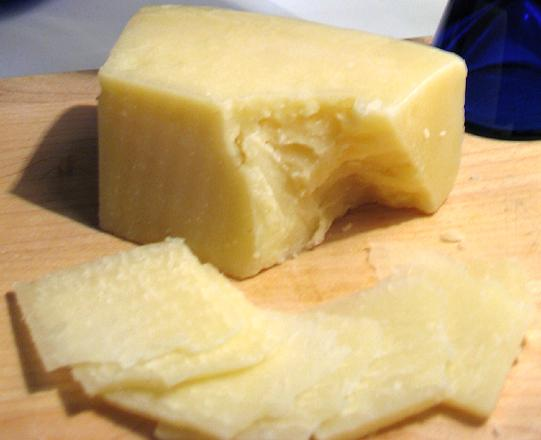
Pecorino Romano is one of the world's most ancient cheeses.

- Cheese – Possibly as early as 8000 BCE after the domestication of the sheep in the Fertile Crescent (Note: "Cheese is represented in the tomb art of ancient Egypt and in Greek literature")
- Caciocavallo
- Feta – existed during the times of Homer in ancient Greece
- Kefalotyri – dates to the Byzantine Empire
- Pecorino Romano – is one of the world's most ancient cheeses
- Pecorino Sardo (Flore sardo) – one of the world's oldest cheeses that is believed to date back to the Bronze Age
- Pecorino Siciliano
- Salers
Ancient cheeses

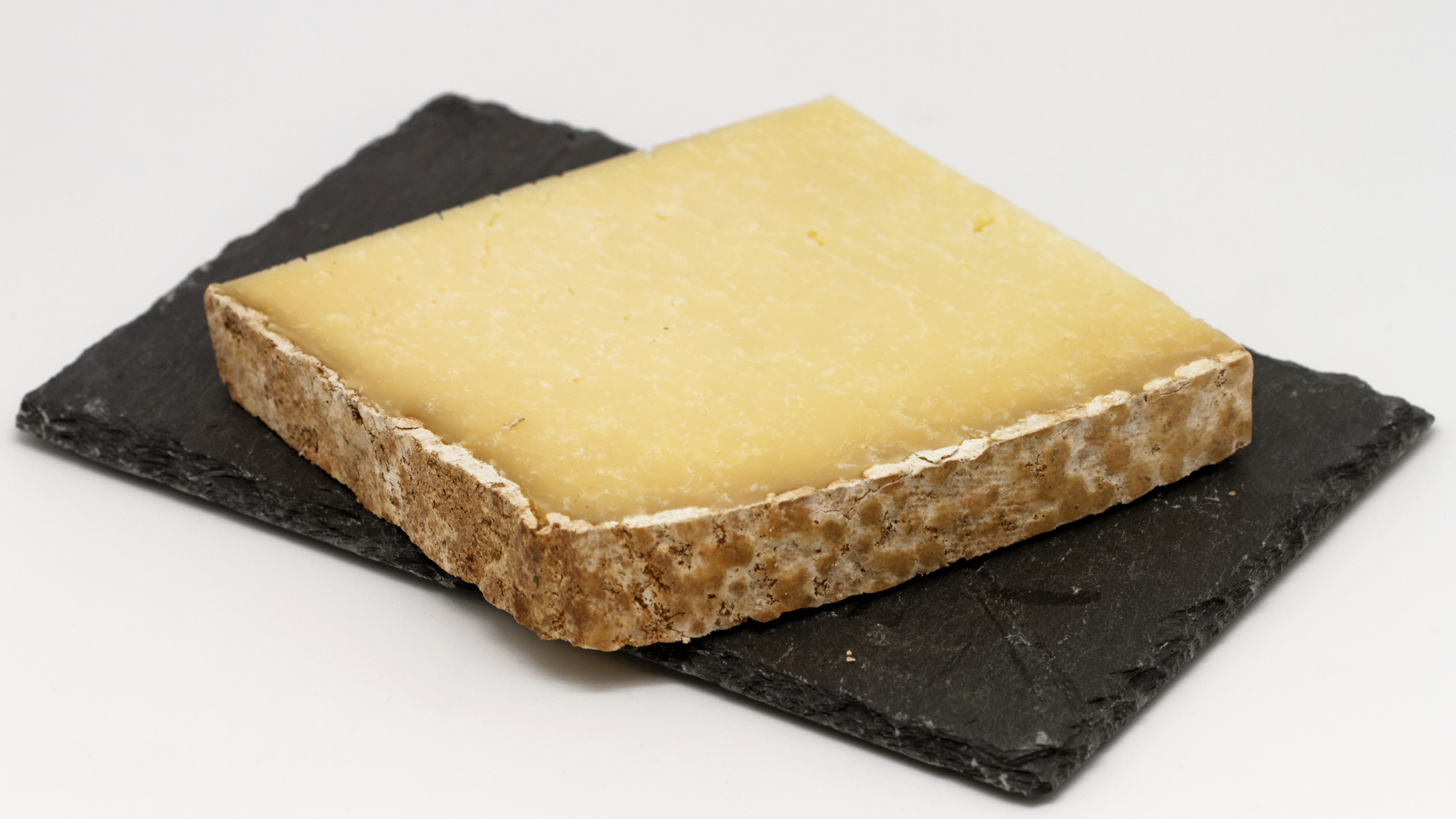
Cantal cheese

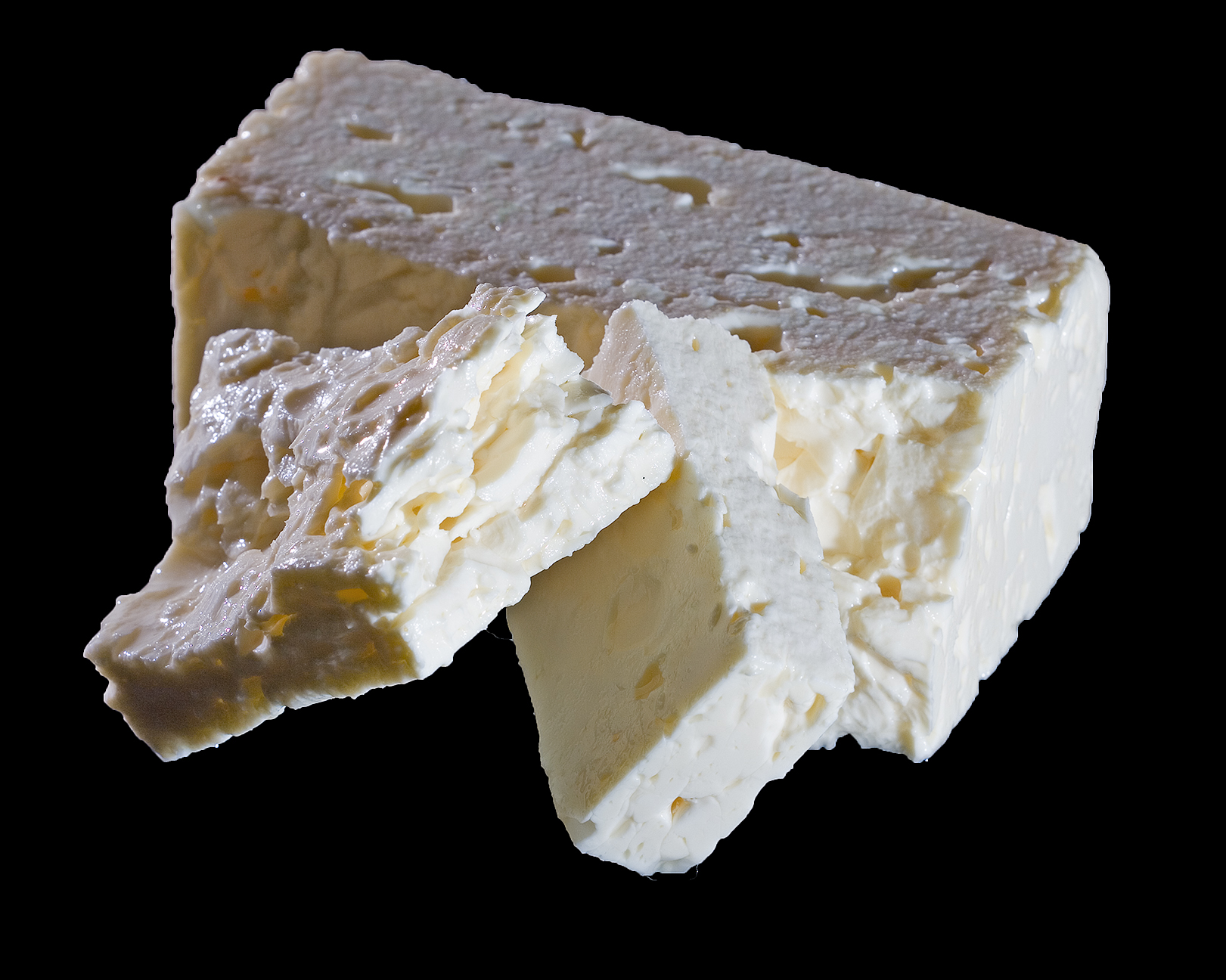
Feta

== See also ==
- List of historical cuisines
- List of post-classical dishes
- Lists of prepared foods
- Timeline of food
