= Nectarius of Auvergne =

4th-century Christian martyr and missionary

Saint Nectarius of Auvergne
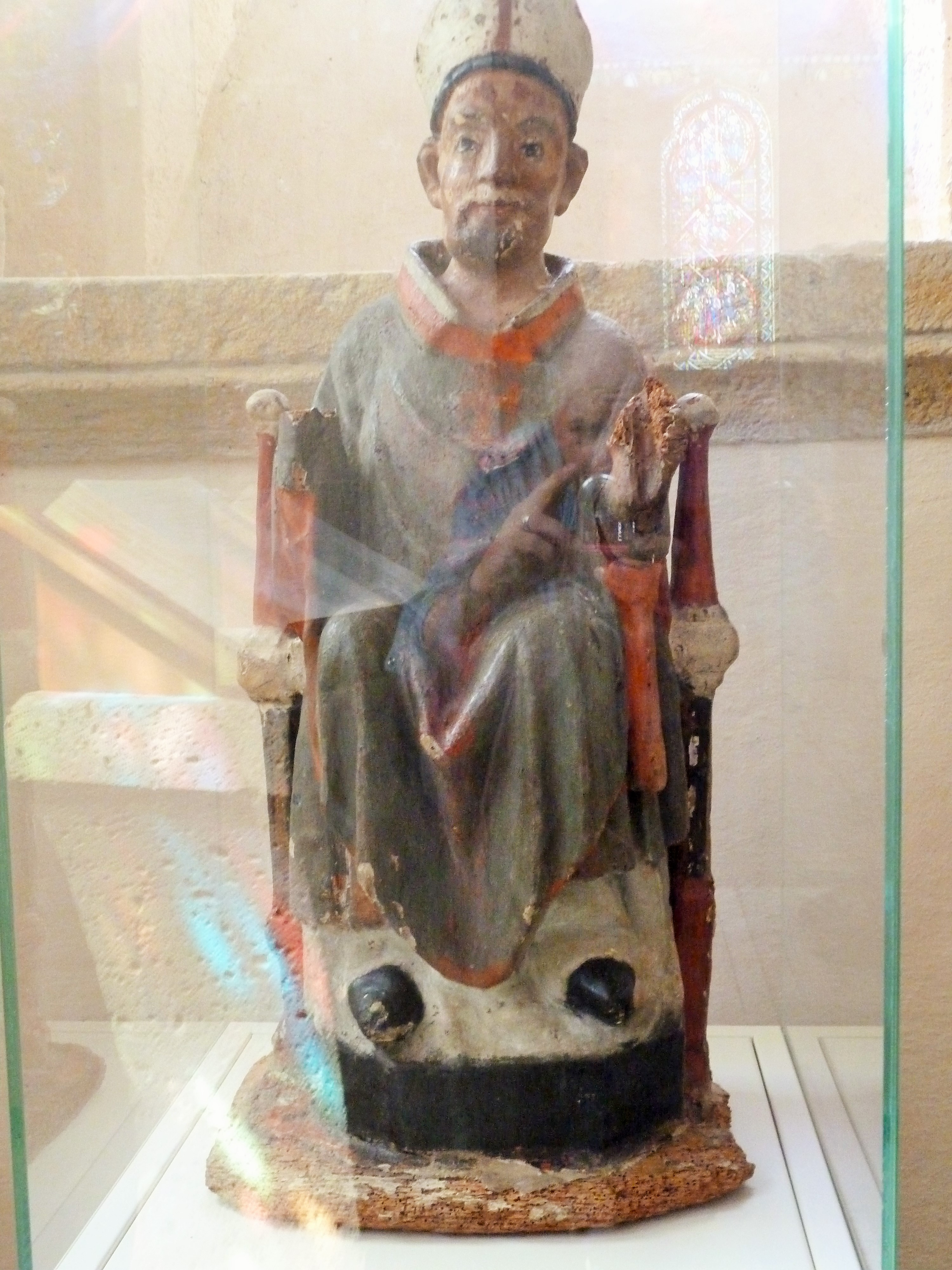
- Statue of Saint Nectarius in the church of St. Nectarius, town of Saint-Nectaire, France.

Martyr
- Born: Rome?
- Died: ~300 AD; Saint-Nectaire, Puy-de-Dôme
- Venerated in: Roman Catholic Church; Eastern Orthodox Church
- Major shrine: Church of Saint-Nectaire, Puy-de-Dôme
- Feast: December 9
- Patronage: Saint-Nectaire, Puy-de-Dôme (with Saint Auditor)

Saint Nectarius of Auvergne (also known as Nectarius of St-Nectaire, Nectarius of Limagne, Necterius of Senneterre; French: Nectaire) is venerated as a 4th-century martyr and Christian missionary.

== Life ==
Nectarius, according to legend, was accused of participating in a conspiracy after the death of his wealthy parents, so he fled to Rome, where he met Christians, was looked after and then baptized by Saint Peter. Peter then sent Nectarius and his brothers to evangelize Gaul.

According to Gregory of Tours, Nectarius was one of the seven missionaries sent by Pope Fabian from Rome to Gaul to spread Christianity there. The other six were Gatianus of Tours, Trophimus of Arles, Paul of Narbonne, Martial of Limoges, Denis of Paris, and Saturninus of Toulouse.

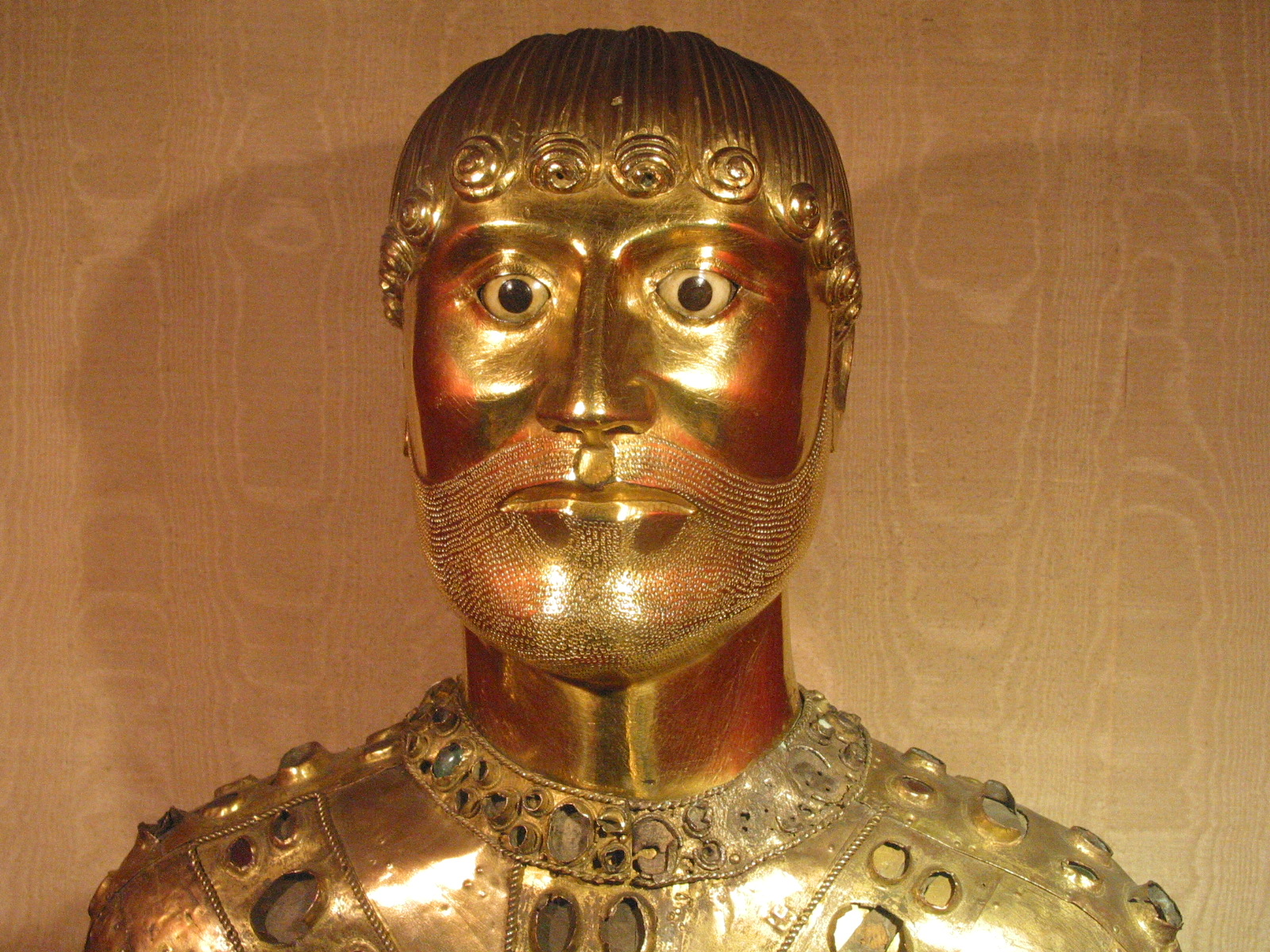
Reliquary bust of Saint Baudimius (Baudime), purported brother of Saint Nectarius.

Nectarius was accompanied by the priests Baudimius (Baudenius, Baudime) and Auditor (Auditeur); tradition states that they were all brothers.

A third tradition states that Saint Austremonius sent Nectarius and Antoninus to Christianize the plain of Limagne in the Massif Central. Nectarius turned a temple dedicated to Apollo on the hill known as Cornadore into a Christian church, which became the Church of Notre Dame du Mont Cornadore (now named after Nectarius) at Saint-Nectaire, in Puy-de-Dôme. Nectarius was subsequently killed by the local pagan leader, Bradulus.

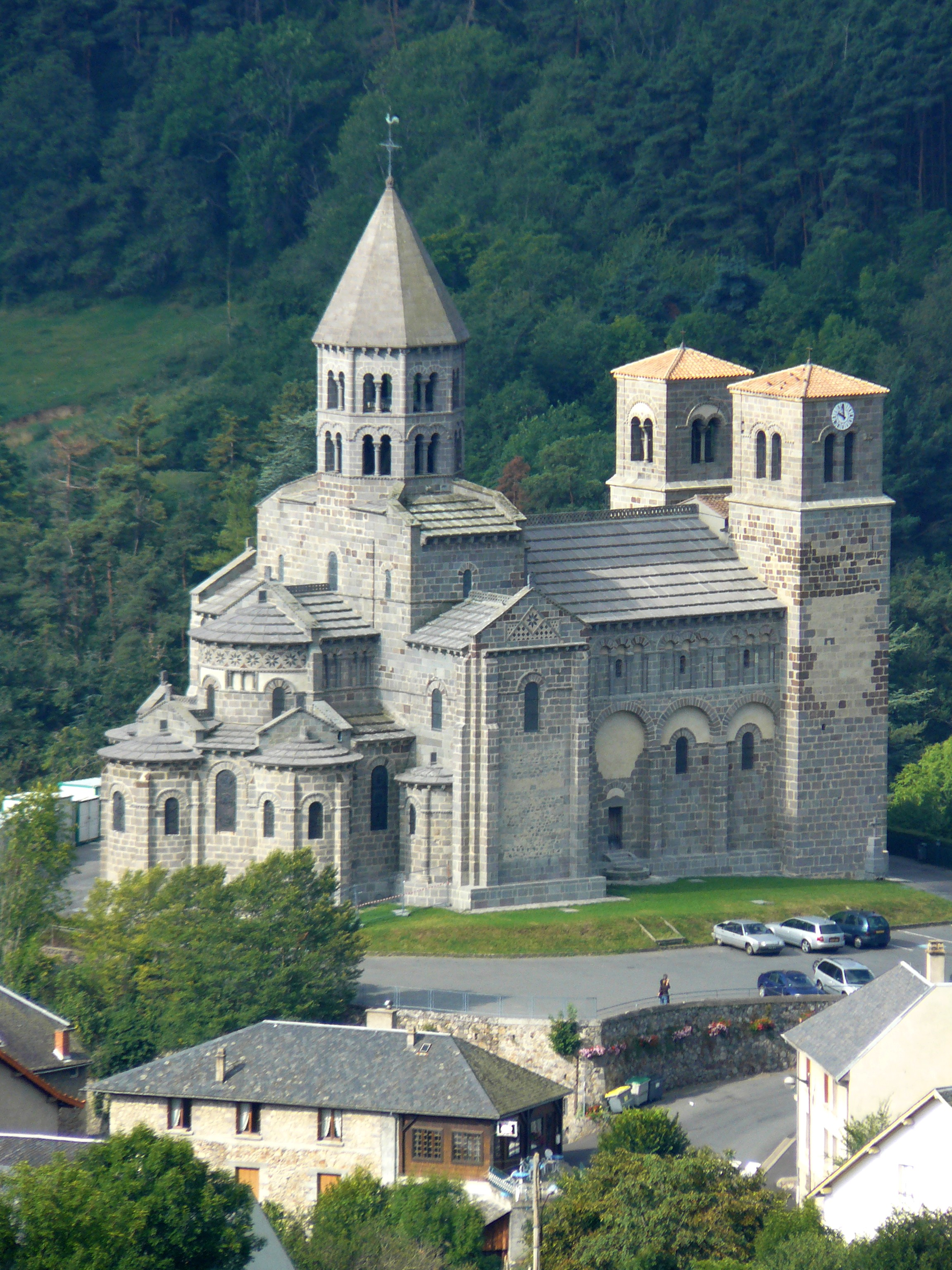
Church of Saint Nectarius at Saint-Nectaire

== Veneration ==
Evidence of veneration for Nectarius dates from the 10th century. A sepulcher at the Benedictine priory of St-Nectaire (corrupted into Sennecterre and Senneterre) became a center of pilgrimage. A borough arose around the priory, which became a center for mineral water and the manufacture of the cheese known as Saint-Nectaire.

Nectarius is the co-patron of Saint-Nectaire along with Saint Auditor, although Saint Auditor is the principal patron saint of that town, for reasons unknown.
