= Testaroli =

Type of pasta or bread in Italian cuisine

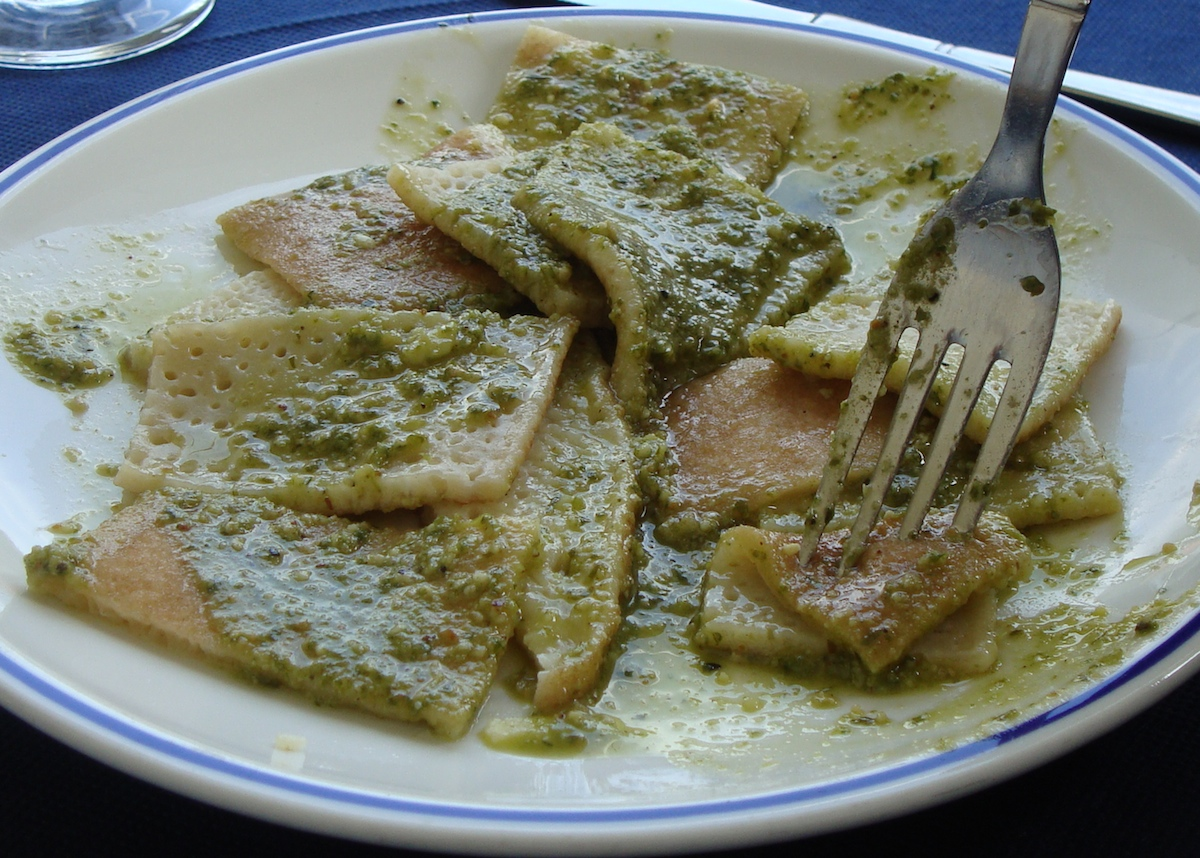
- A plate of testaroli with pesto, as served at a trattoria in Pontremoli, Tuscany, Italy
- Type: Pasta
- Place of origin: Italy
- Main ingredients: Flour, water
- Variations: Falsi testaroli al ragù
- Other information: May be served with pesto, olive oil, pecorino, Parmesan, and garlic.

Testaroli, sometimes referred to as testarolo, is a type of thin spongy pasta or bread in Italian cuisine that is prepared in circular sheets using water, flour, and salt, which is then sliced into diamond or rectangular shapes. A common dish in the Lunigiana region and historical territory of Italy, it is an ancient pasta originating from the Etruscan civilization of Italy. Testaroli has been described as "the earliest recorded pasta". It is also a native dish of the southern Liguria and northern Tuscany regions of Italy.

Testaroli is prepared from a batter that is cooked on a hot flat surface, after which it may be consumed. It is traditionally cooked on a testo, a flat terracotta or cast iron cooking surface from which the food's name is derived. It is sometimes cooked further in boiling water and then served. Testaroli is sometimes referred to as a bread, and is sometimes referred to as a crêpe. It may be dressed with pesto sauce or other ingredients such as olive oil, pecorino, Parmesan, and garlic. Falsi testaroli al ragù is a similar dish, prepared using sliced pasta dough and a ragù sauce.

== Etymology ==
Testaroli's name is based upon the testo, a terracotta or cast iron cooking device with a hot, flat surface that testaroli is traditionally cooked on.

== History ==
Testaroli is an ancient pasta that originated from the Etruscan civilization, a civilization of ancient Italy. The book Rustico: Regional Italian Country Cooking states that testaroli is "a direct descendant of the porridges of the Neolithic age that were poured over hot stones to cook". It is a native dish of the southern Liguria and northern Tuscany regions of Italy. According to an article published by The Wall Street Journal, it is "the earliest recorded pasta".

In the Italian province of Massa-Carrara, located within the Tuscany region, it was a peasant food consumed as a one-course meal, topped with grated cheese and olive oil. In Massa and Carrara, it was sometimes accompanied with stracchino cheese or charcuterie. Testaroli remains a very popular dish in Pontremoli, a small town in the province of Massa-Carrara, where it is served at virtually every restaurant in the town, during both mornings and evenings. (Note: "Yet in Pontremoli there is not a single restaurant that does not offer testaroli, morning and evening, daily brought fresh from the villages surrounding the town, at midday and the evening as well.") Testaroli is also a common and specialty dish in the Lunigiana region and historical territory of Italy, which is located between the Liguria and Tuscany regions.

== Overview ==
=== Ingredients and preparation ===
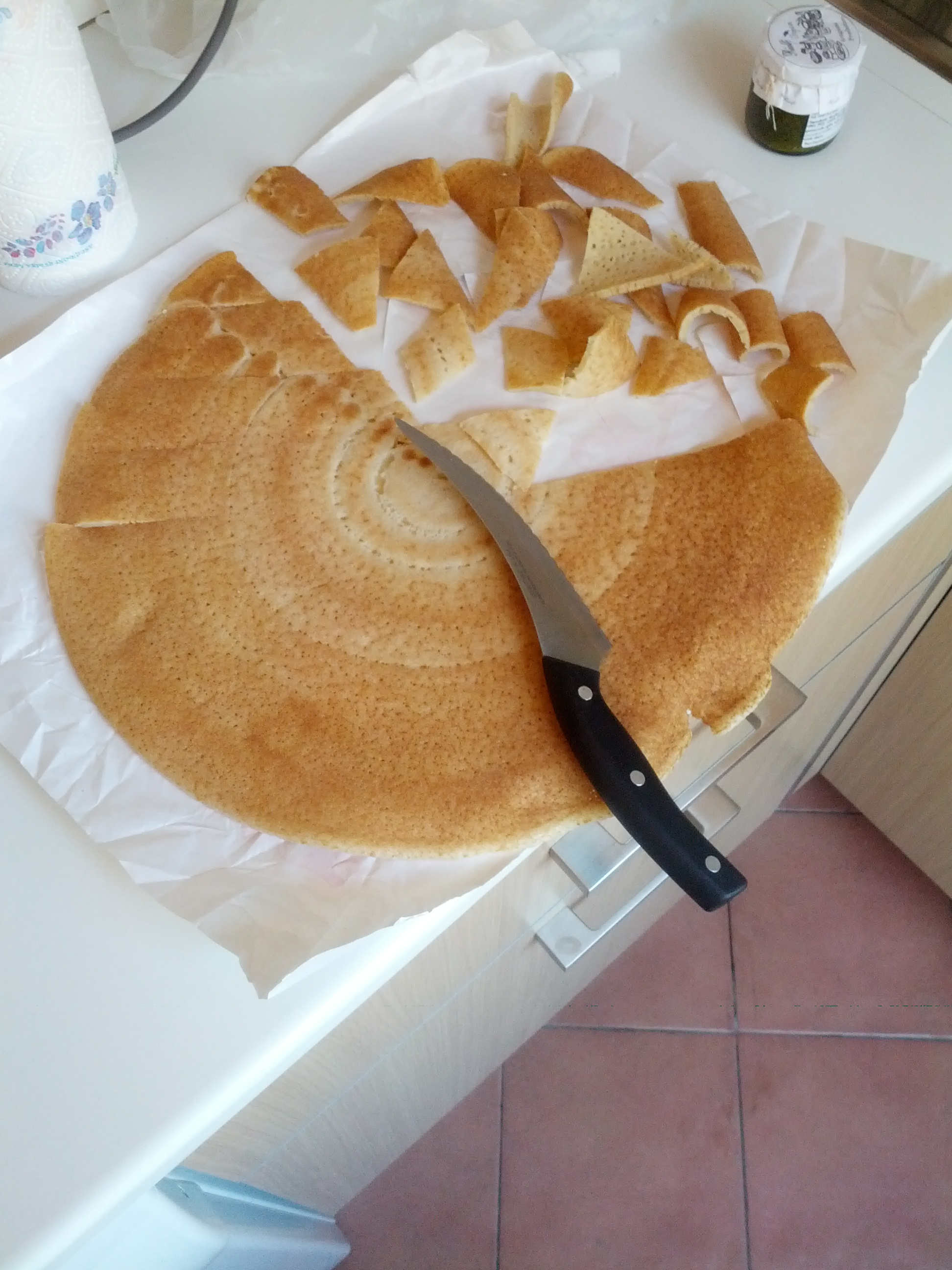
Testaroli being sliced

Testaroli is a type of pancake-like pasta prepared using water, wheat flour, and salt that is sliced into triangular shapes. (Note: "The local culinary speciality is a type of large pancake-like pasta, testaroli, available in any one of the town's ...") Chestnut flour is sometimes used in its preparation. The ingredients are mixed together and prepared as a batter, after which it is cooked, sometimes using a two-stage cooking process. In the typical first stage, and sometimes only stage of cooking, the batter is poured and cooked on a hot, flat surface in the style of a pancake or crêpe. (Note: Pesto here is served with primitive pasta called testaroli—a crêpe-like Ligurian concoction that is rolled out and pan-fried, then cut up in spongy ...) In this process, testaroli is traditionally cooked on a testo, which may be prepared for use by being heated over hot coals. A skillet is another cooking device that can be used to cook the batter. (Note: This centuries-old pasta dish is prepared like a pancake in a hot skillet, then ... Once testaroli are cool, cut into diamond-shaped pieces about 6 ...) The pasta is then sliced into triangles, and is sometimes directly served after this cooking process. In the second cooking stage that is sometimes performed, the pasta may be set aside to cool, and then cooked further in boiling water.

Testaroli is sometimes referred to as a type of bread that is similar to focaccia, and is also sometimes referred to as a crêpe. The book The Italian Country Table refers to testaroli as a "near cousin to pasta", and as a "great round pancake-like bread no more than a quarter inch thick". This book also states that when it is baked to a crisp texture, it can be consumed in the style of a bread, whereas when baked less, it may have a spongy and soft texture, like a pasta. (Note: "When baked to soft and spongy (a state reached in several different ways, each traditional to its own area), testaroli straddle the line between bread and pasta.") Cooking methods vary in different areas of Italy, and some of these methods are traditional in nature.

=== Service ===
Testaroli is sometimes served with pesto sauce, which is a common addition to it in the Liguria and Tuscany regions of Italy. Another dressing method includes the addition of olive oil, pecorino, Parmesan, garlic and basil. Significant amounts of sauce may absorb into testaroli.

== Falsi testaroli al ragù ==
A very similar dish is falsi testaroli al ragù, which is prepared using sliced pasta dough and does not involve the use of a batter or cooking on a testo. It is served with a ragù, an Italian meat-based sauce.

== See also ==
- List of pasta
- List of ancient dishes and foods
- Bavette – one of the more ancient types of long pasta

== Bibliography ==
- Guaiti, D. (2010). Liguria – La grande cucina regionale italiana (in Italian). Edizioni Gribaudo. pp. 58–59. ISBN 978-88-580-0330-5.
