= Tharida =

Soup in Arab cuisine

Tharida (also referred to as tharidat Ghassan) is a soup in Arab cuisine prepared with broth, stewed meat and bread crumbs that are crumbled using one's fingers; (Note: "Tharida- A dish consisting of bread crumbled with fingers ...") the bread crumbs serve to thicken the soup. It was sometimes prepared using brains for the meat. Additional ingredients that can be used include beans, crushed or pounded walnuts, yogurt, mint and spices. It may have a milky appearance. Hundreds of variations and recipes exist for the dish.

Tharida served as a symbol of Arab identity during the "early years of Islam". Muhammad said that tharida surpasses other dishes as Aisha, his favorite wife, "surpasses other women". (Note: "(or tharida) an ancient Arabian dish of bread mixed with stewed meat. It was praised by the Prophet Muhammad, who said of his favourite wife: 'Aisha surpasses other women as tharid surpasses other dishes.' The Prophet's sanction has made ...")

== See also ==
- List of ancient dishes and foods
- List of soups
