= Saint-Nectaire =

Semi-soft cheese from central France

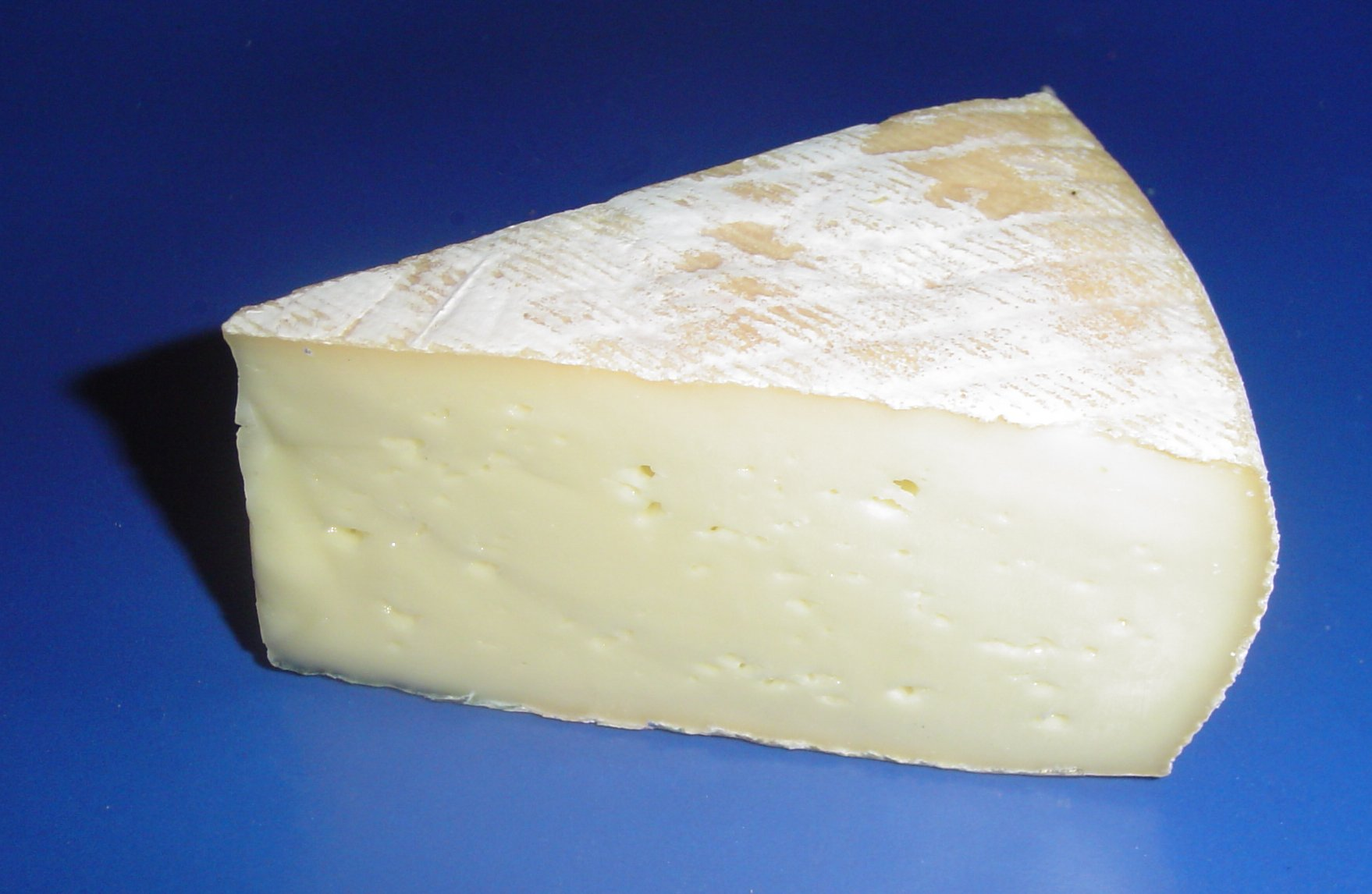
- Country of origin: France
- Region, town: Auvergne, Saint Nectaire
- Source of milk: Cow
- Pasteurised: Depends on variety
- Texture: Semi-soft washed rind
- Aging time: 8 weeks
- Certification: French AOC 1955
- Named after: Saint-Nectaire

Saint-Nectaire (French pronunciation: [sɛ̃ nɛktɛʁ]; Occitan: Sench-Nectari) is a French cheese made in the Auvergne region of central France.

The cheese has been made in Auvergne since at least the 17th century.

== History ==
Until the 17th century, the Saint-Nectaire cheese was farmstead, and mostly made by women. It was also called "rye cheese", as it was matured on rye. It is known for its creamy and unctuous paste and hazelnut flavour. It was introduced to the court of King Louis XIV by the marshal of France Henri de La Ferté-Senneterre (1600–1681), where the cheese immediately gained the king's favour. By 1768, it was already widely recognized, as Legrand d’Aussy described the cheese in a story about his trip to Auvergne: "If someone wants to treat you to a feast, there is always going to be some Saint-Nectaire". Senneterre was also responsible for the introduction of the cheeses Cantal and Salers.

== Description ==
This cheese is a non-baked cheese with compressed paste, made from cow's milk, mainly of Holstein and Montbéliarde and sometimes Salers. It has a cylindrical shape, is about 20 to 24 cm (7.9 to 9.4 in) wide, and is about 3 to 5 cm (1.2 to 2.0 in) thick. It never weighs more than 1.850 kg (4.08 lb). The "petit-Saint-Nectaire" is 12 to 14 cm (4.7 to 5.5 in) wide, 3.5 to 4.5 cm (1.4 to 1.8 in) thick, and the weight doesn't exceed 0.650 kg (1.43 lb). The cheese has a rind that is similar on both sides, with few moulds. Depending on how old the cheese is, the rind can be white, brown or grey, and with orange, yellow, or red patches. If a cheese has a uniform colour, it can't be sold as a Saint-Nectaire cheese. There is a minimum of 45 grams of fat per 100 grams of cheese once the cheese is desiccated. The whole refined cheese must have less than 50% of dry-matter content. Once cut, the Saint-Nectaire has a soft, fluid and smelly paste, of a creamy colour. Its taste has a hint of hazelnut, due to the aromatic flora where the cheese ages.

== Terroir ==
The cheese is made in a grassy and volcanic area, around the Pays des Monts-Dore. The region authorized to produce Saint-Nectaire includes a total of 72 villages, 52 of which are in Puy-de-Dome (including the village of Saint-Nectaire) and 20 of which are in Cantal.

== Appellation ==
Saint-Nectaire is an Appellation d'origine contrôlée (AOC), a certification given to French agricultural products based on a set of clearly defined standards. For example, it must be made of cow's milk in a specifically delimited area in the Monts-Dore region. The Appellation was first recognized at a national level and awarded AOC status in 1955.

At that time, the Saint-Nectaire cheese was produced only on farms from milk from their own cows. When the appellation was accorded, industrial milk and dairy factories were also allowed to produce Saint-Nectaire. To differentiate between products made from the two processes, farmstead cheeses are marked with a small oval label in green casein, while a square label is applied to industrial cheeses. In 1996, a Protected Designation of Origin (PDO) was given to Saint-Nectaire, extending name protection to the entire European Union. A new appellation, "petit-Saint-Nectaire" (meaning 'small Saint-Nectaire'), given to cheeses that weigh 600 grams, was later included in the specifications.

== Manufacture ==
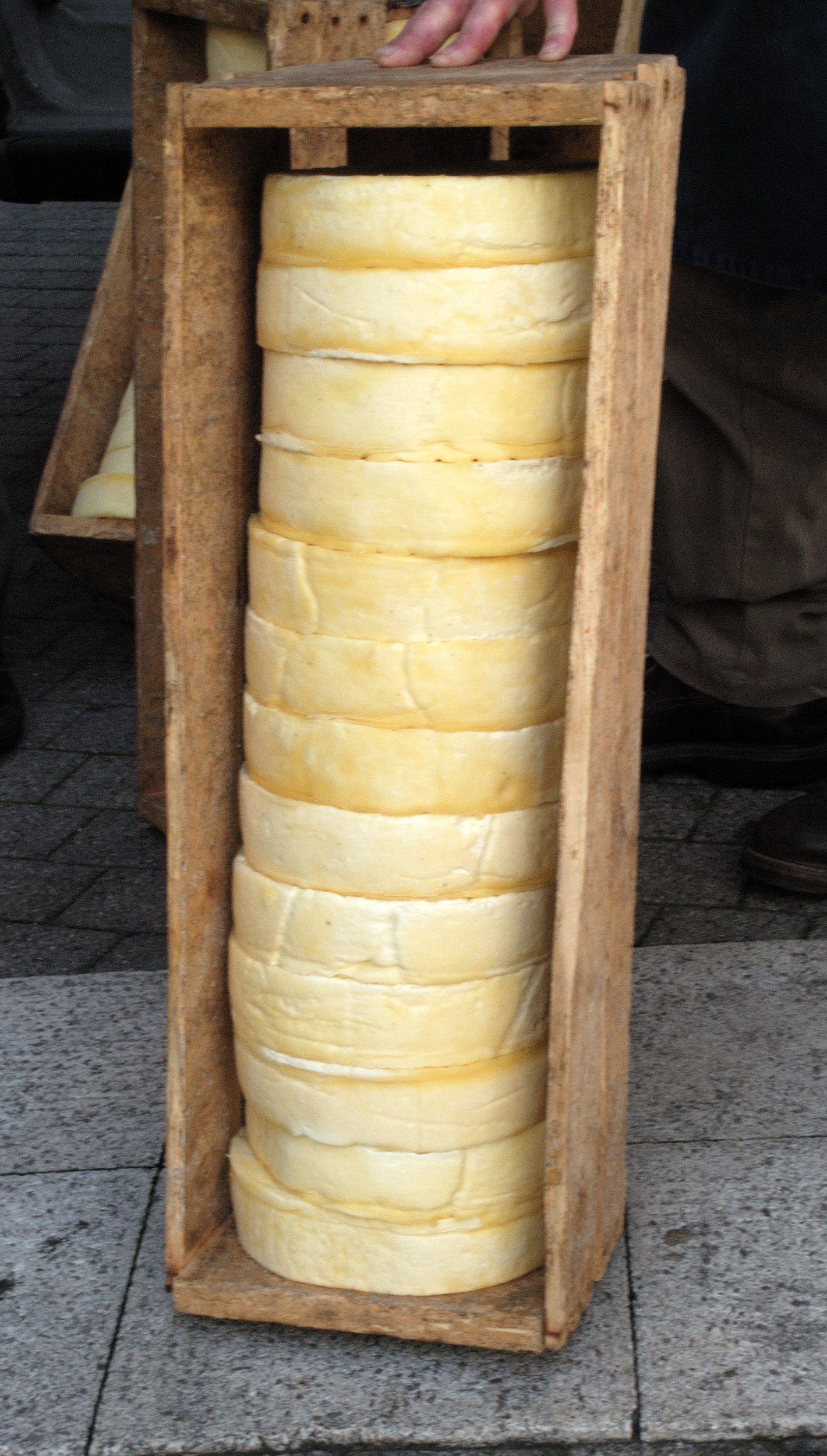
Box of saint Nectaire before aging (affinage)

Farmstead Saint-Nectaire cheese is always made of whole and unpasteurised milk, two times a day, right after each milking. Industrialized Saint-Nectaire cheese can be made of mixed milks, or thermised or pasteurised milks. 13 to 14 L (3.4 to 3.7 US gal) of milk are necessary to the elaboration of a single cheese.

After each milking, and once the milk is pasteurised, rennet is added to the milk and renneted for a period of 30 to 40 minutes, whether it is an industrial or farmstead cheese. The curd obtained is then uncurdled with a lyre, an instrument made of metal. The milk is uncurdled in order to obtain bits of renneted cheese about the size of wheat grains.

The next stage of the production is the picking up of the grains, which fall and are gathered to the tank bottom. Then, the operator removes the whey that makes up for 80% of the initial volume of milk. The milk serum or milk permeate is later given to the cows, spread in the fields. It can also be collected by some dairy industries that extract cream from it, turn it into powder to feed the calves, or use it in the elaboration of other food products, such as chocolate and pre-packaged-meals. Once drained, the bits of renneted milk are pressed for the first time into their mould using a machine. The compressed cheese is called tome. The tome is then wrapped into linen, a little casein stamp (oval or square) is put on top of it, and the cheese is salted (with some brine). Next it is put into a press for 12 to 24 hours. The next step is called ressuyage (lit. 're-wiping'), when the cheese is unwrapped, and stored in a cold room, at 10 °C (50 °F), with between 40% and 60% relative humidity. Farmers and dairy producers can allow the “tome” to mature, or sell to cheese aging specialists.

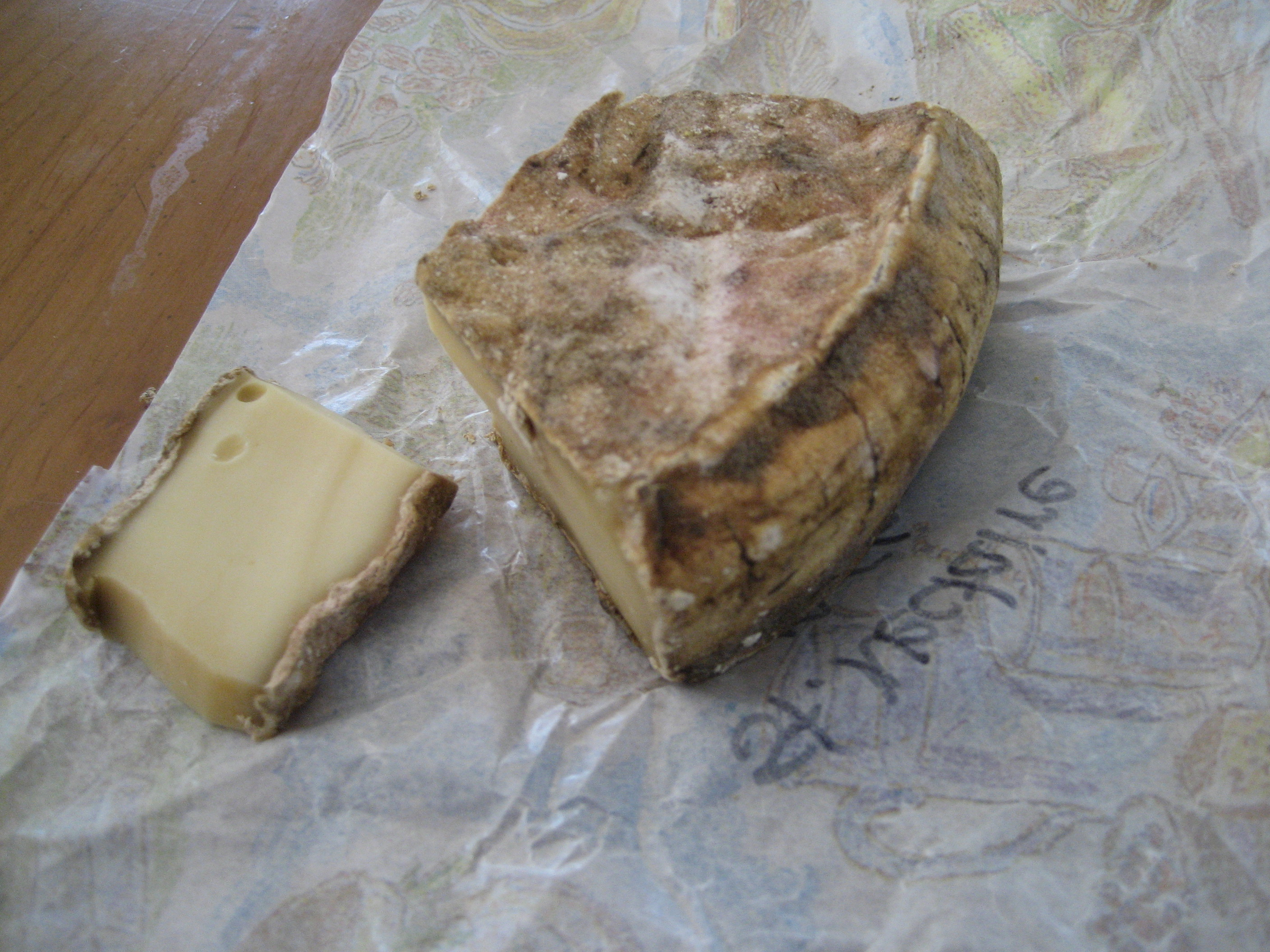
Farm-produced Saint-Nectaire (non-industrial) has an edible rough and irregular rind.

The affinage (maturing process) starts for a duration of a minimum of 28 days, according to the specification (reduced to 21 days for the "petit-Saint-Nectaire"). In general, it takes five to six weeks to a farmstead cheese, but it can last up to two or three months, for a cheese to mature. In the meantime, the cheeses are washed several times with salted water, and are regularly turned over, to obtain the orange-grey rind, that is specific of the Saint-Nectaire cheese.

The cheese are aged on rye straw. The majority of Saint-Nectaires are transported to a professional affineur for the final six weeks of the affinage. The affinage is cut short if it is decided that the flavour and scent are not developing sufficiently.

== Production ==
The Saint-Nectaire is the first farmstead Appellation in France, in terms of volume. It represents 6,500 tons per year, and the number of farmstead producers amounts to 240 farmers. Moreover, the dairy industries and cheese factories produce 7000 tons. A total of 13,500 tons of cheese were produced in 2007.

== Gastronomy ==
The cheese can go with any kind of meal. It can be used in tarts, pies and buns.

== Tourism ==
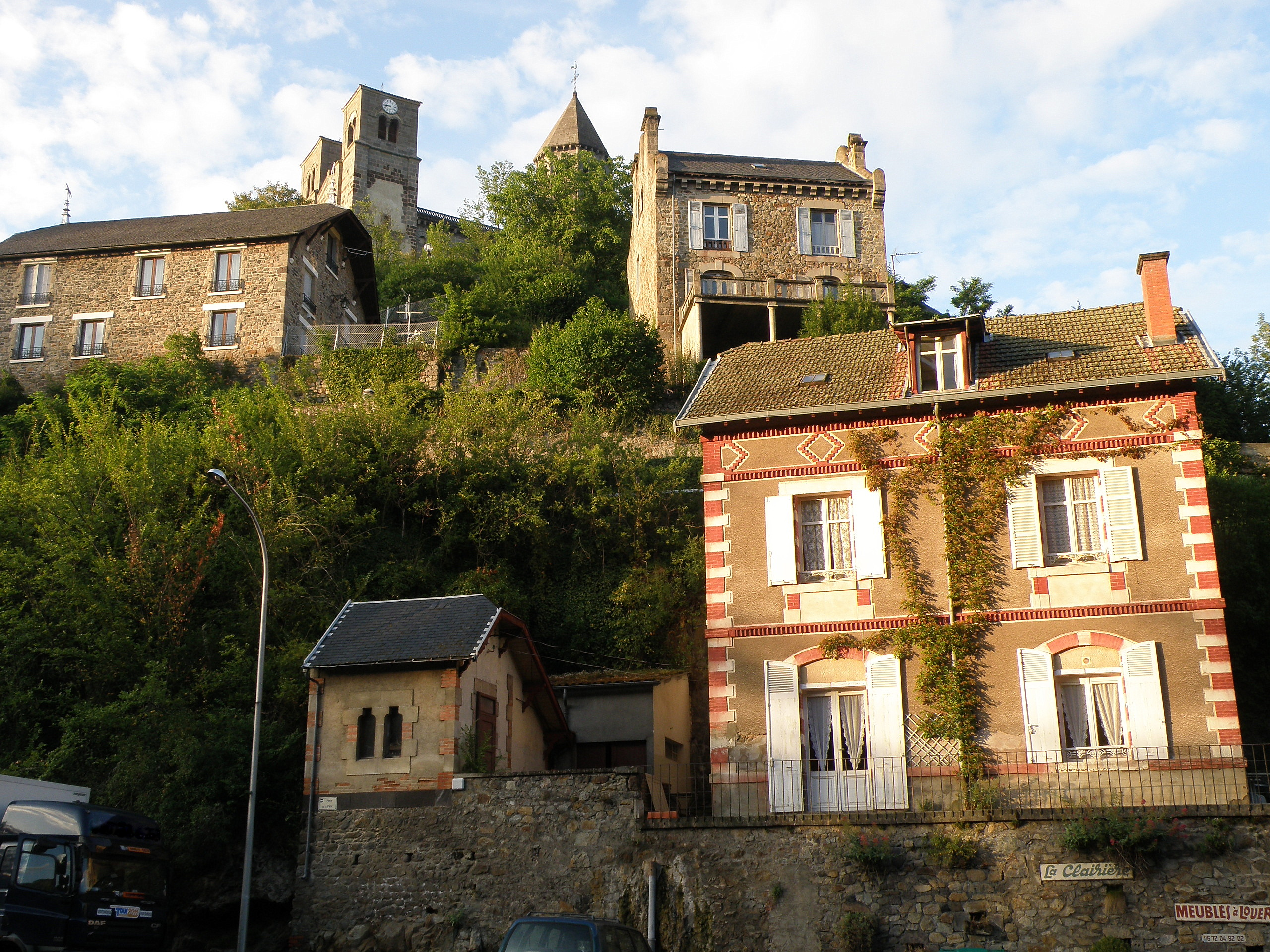
The village of Saint-Nectaire

"La Maison du Saint-Nectaire", or House of Saint-Nectaire, is located in the village of Saint-Nectaire, on the road of Murol. It is a museum, which shows the history and the methods of production of Saint-Nectaire.

== Anecdotes ==
The cheese's name comes from the Marshal of Senneterre (a linguistic corruption of "Saint-Nectaire"), who served it at the table of Louis XIV.

== See also ==
- List of cheeses
- List of French cheeses
