= Saint-Nectaire, Puy-de-Dôme =

Saint-Nectaire
- Commune
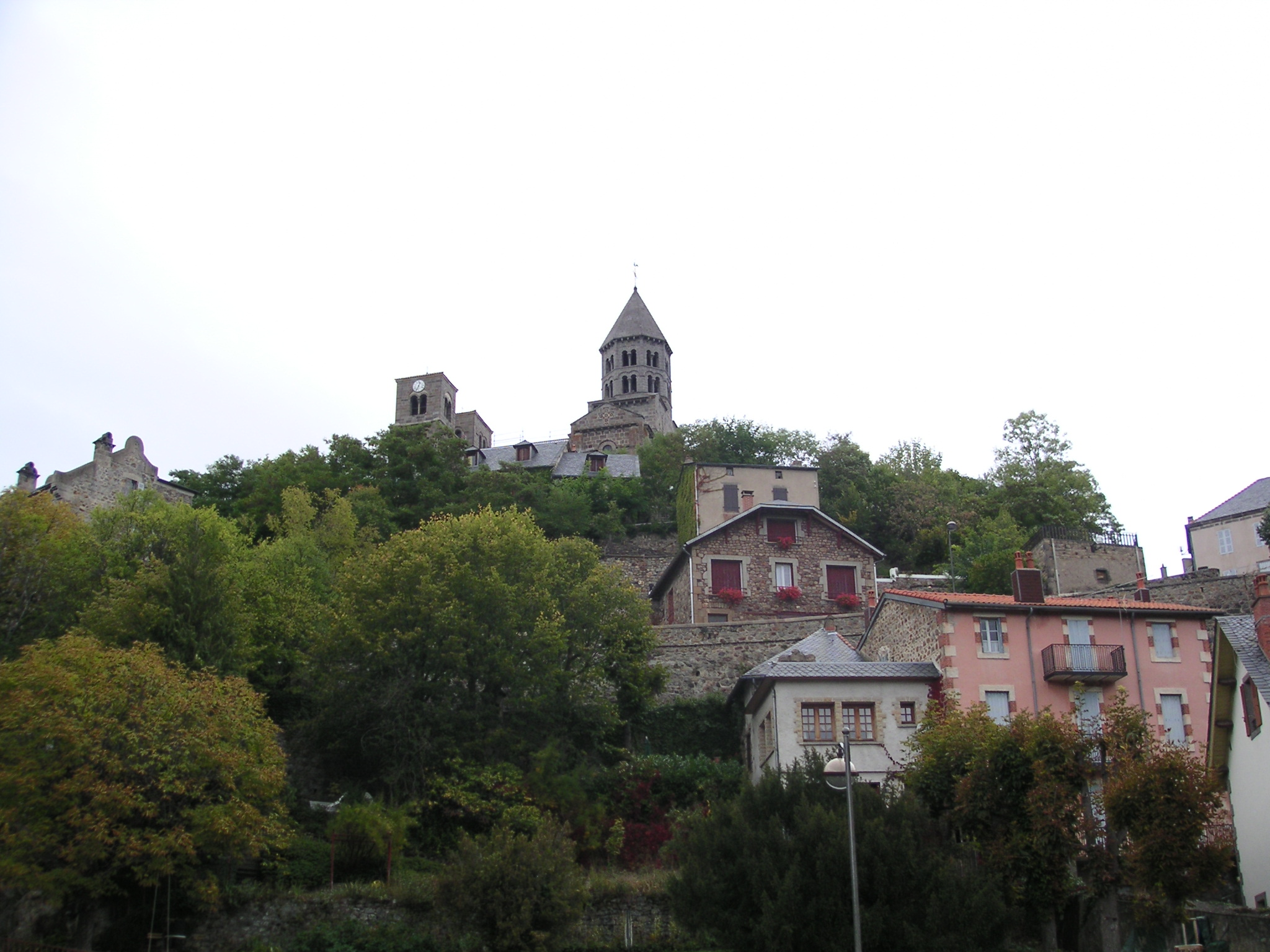
- A view from the town

- Coat of arms
- Location of Saint-Nectaire
- Location within France Location within Auvergne-Rhône-Alpes
- Coordinates: 45°35′17″N 2°59′31″E
- Country: France
- Region: Auvergne-Rhône-Alpes
- Department: Puy-de-Dôme
- Arrondissement: Issoire
- Canton: Le Sancy

Government
  - Mayor (2020–2026): Alphonse Bellonte
- Area^{1}: 33.26 km^{2} (12.84 sq mi)
- Elevation: 760 m (2,490 ft)
- Population (2023): 822
  - Density: 24.7/km^{2} (64.0/sq mi)
- Time zone: UTC+01:00 (CET)
  - Summer (DST): UTC+02:00 (CEST)
- INSEE/Postal code: 63380 /63710
- ^{1} French Land Register data, which excludes lakes, ponds, glaciers > 1 km^{2} (0.386 sq mi or 247 acres) and river estuaries.

Saint-Nectaire (French pronunciation: [sɛ̃ nɛktɛʁ]; Auvergnat: Sant Nectare) is a commune in the Puy-de-Dôme department in Auvergne in central France. The village is in two sections Saint-Nectaire-le-Haut and Saint-Nectaire-le-Bas. It is a popular summer vacation destination, with a disproportionate number of hotels and restaurants for a rural village of its size.

== History ==
Saint-Nectaire was the name of an estate in Auvergne that belonged to the count of Auvergne, who ceded it at a date between 1146 and 1178 to the Abbey of La Chaise-Dieu for the foundation of a priory and sepulcher dedicated to Saint Nectarius of Auvergne (Saint Nectaire), associated with the site as the first evangelist of the region. The legenda of Saint Nectarius record the site of a temple of Apollo on Mont Cornadore, converted into the basilica, of which the oldest structures still standing are of the eleventh century. In the basilica is a characteristically Auvergnat Virgin and Child of the second half of the twelfth century. The site's thermal springs, which would account for a healing shrine of Apollo, were extensively developed in the 19th century into a spa facility. In a cave in the mountain are hydrothermal stalagmites.

The château-fort, whose ruins survive near the church, gave its name to a feudal house holding distinguished rank in the 13th century but extinct in the 18th. The eldest branch of this family held the marquisate of La Ferté, and produced a heroine of the religious wars of the 16th century, Madeleine de Saint Nectaire, who married Guy de St Exupery, seigneur de Miremont, in 1548, and fought successfully at the head of the Protestants in her territory against the troops of the League. To the same house belonged the branches of the marquises of Chateauneuf, the seigneurs of Brinon-sur-Sauldre and St Victour, and the seigneurs of Clavelier and Fontenilles, all of which are now extinct.

== See also ==
- Communes of the Puy-de-Dôme department
- Henri de La Ferté-Senneterre
