= Salers cheese =

French semi-hard cow's milk cheese

Salers
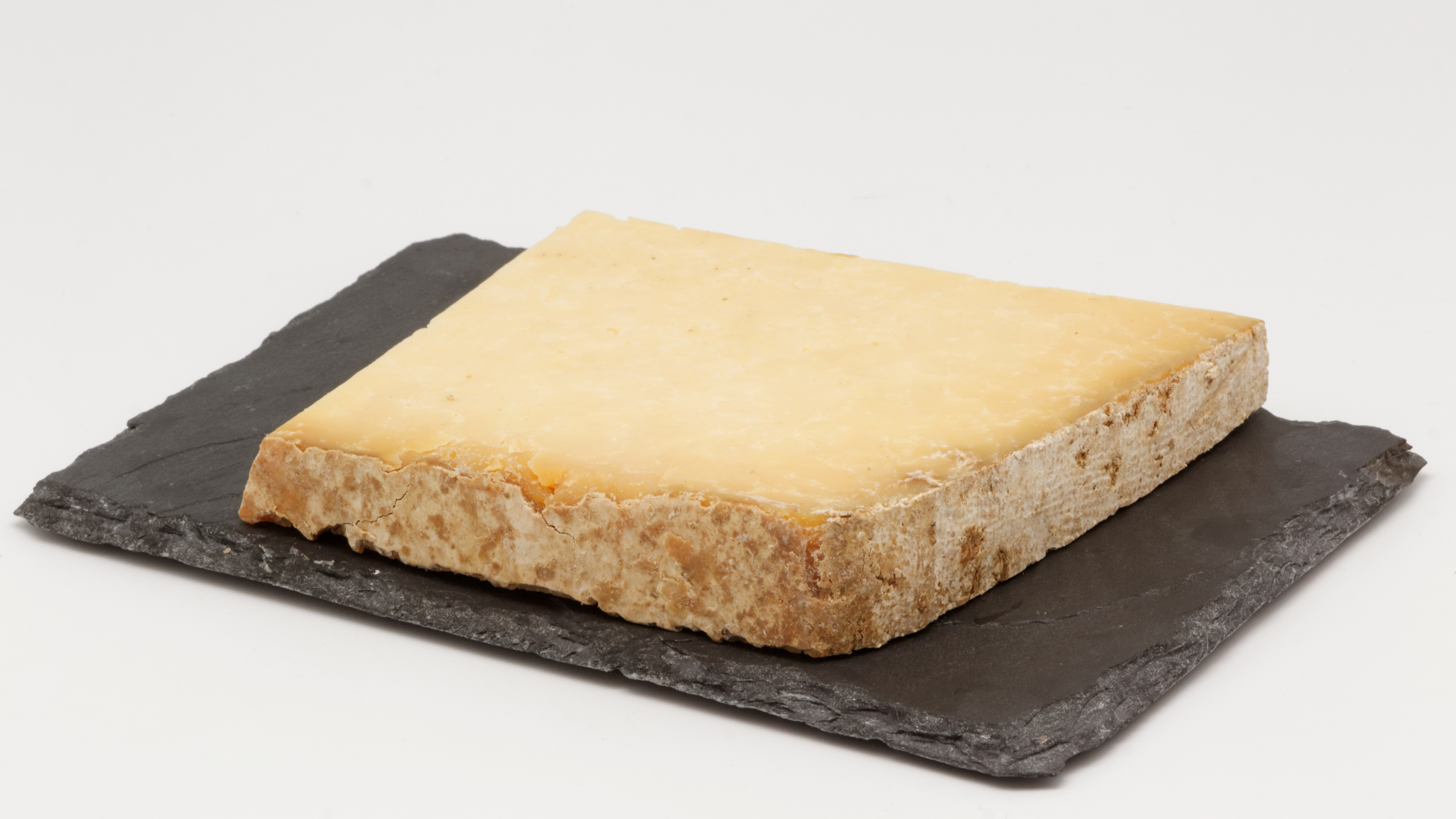
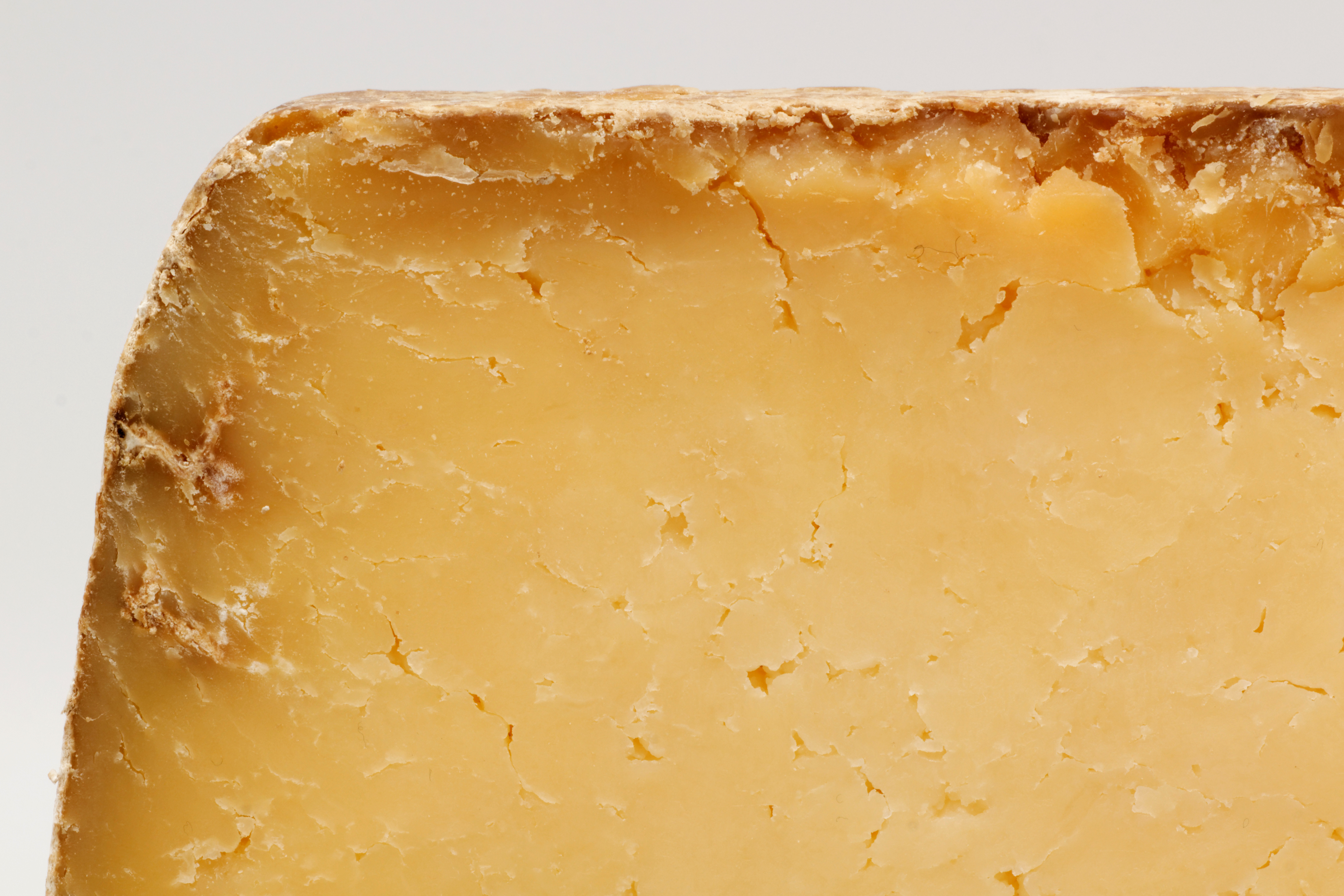
- A rectangular cut of Salers Close-up view of the rind and texture of Salers
- Country of origin: France
- Region: Auvergne, Salers
- Source of milk: Cow
- Pasteurised: No
- Texture: Semi-hard
- Aging time: Minimum of 3 months, and up to 45 months
- Certification: French AOC 1961

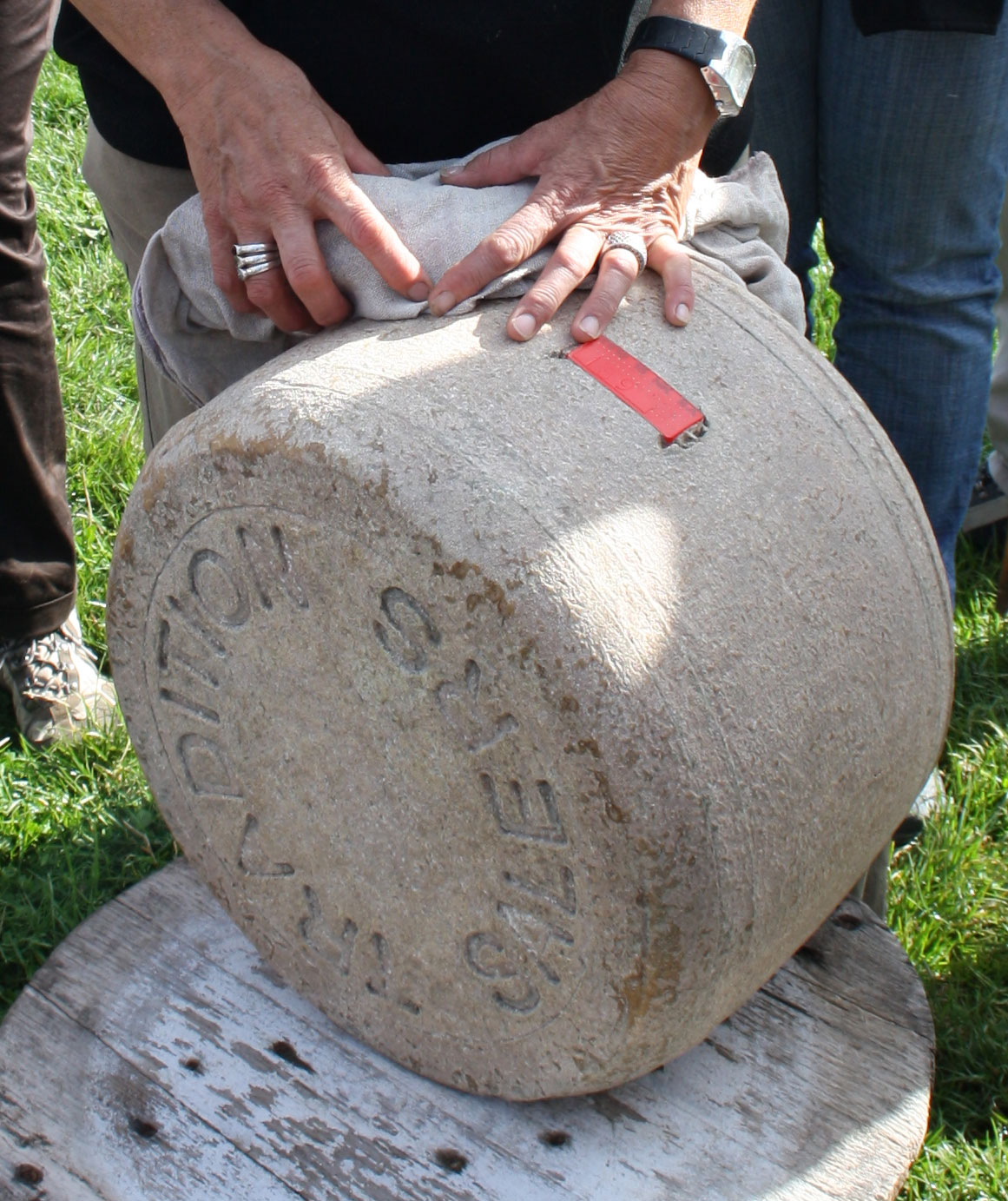
A wheel of Salers

Salers (French pronunciation: [salɛʁ]; Auvergnat: Salèrn) is a French semi-hard cheese originating from Salers, department of Cantal, in the volcanic mountains of the Massif Central, Auvergne, central France. It is a pressed, uncooked cheese, sometimes made from Salers cow's milk (it's then called "Tradition Salers"), between 15 April and 15 November. It is circular in shape, formed in rounds weighing around 40 kilograms (88 lb). The cheese is aged in caves at temperatures ranging from 6–12 °C (43–54 °F) for a minimum of 3 months, and up to 45 months.

Salers de Buron Traditional is only made in stone huts (called burons in the Cantal) in the summer months with milk exclusively from the Salers cow. It must also be made in the traditional wooden gerle.

== History ==
Salers has been produced since ancient times. It is estimated to have been produced in this region for at least 2,000 years. Salers came to prominence when the Maréchal de Senneterre served it at the table of Louis XIV. Senneterre is also responsible for the introduction of Saint-Nectaire and Cantal. Salers has benefited from the Appellation d'origine contrôlée (AOC) since 1961.

Traditional Salers producers are becoming increasingly rare, with fewer than 100 farmhouse producers remaining today. 1,112 tonnes were produced in 1998 (+15.1% since 1996); all was made in local farms from unpasteurized milk.

== Similar to Cantal ==
Salers is similar to Cantal cheese, which is produced from the same cows' milk when they are fed on hay during the remaining months of the year.

== See also ==
- List of ancient dishes and foods
- List of cheeses
