= Salers cattle =

Breed of cattle

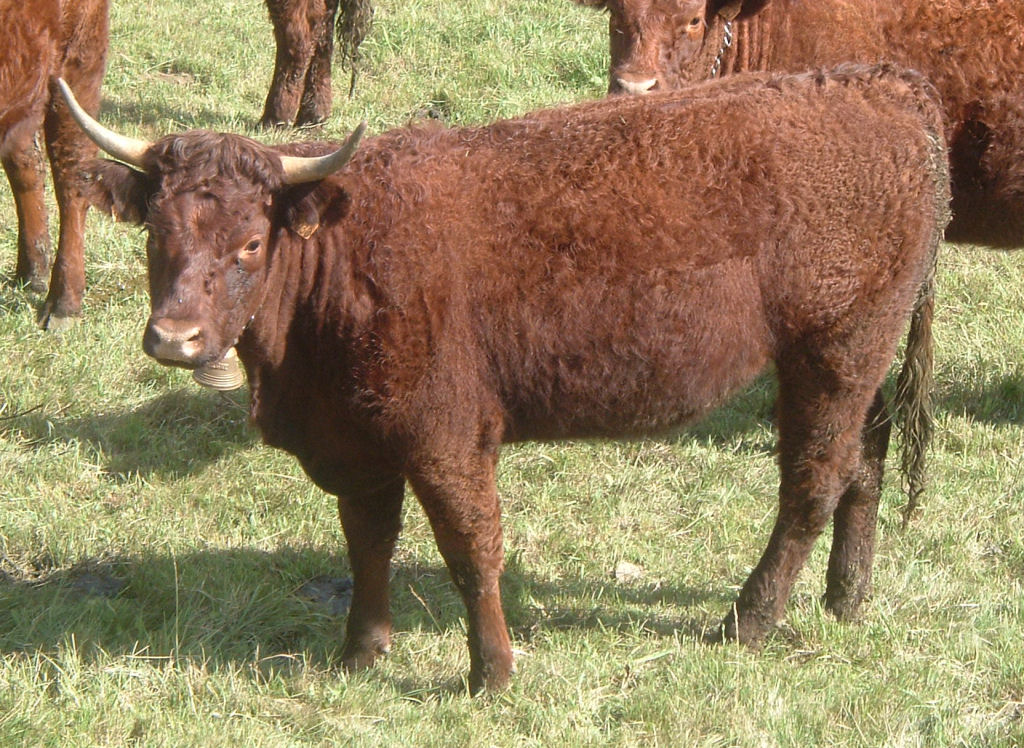
Salers cattle

The Salers (French: race de Salers or La Salers; plural: Les Salers) is a breed of cattle which originated in Cantal in the Massif Central of France.

They are a large breed, with the female weighing between 700 and 750 kg (1,543 to 1,653 lb) and standing 1.40 m (4.6 feet) tall. They have a thick, mahogany red or black coat, and long, lyre-shaped, light-coloured horns. A small percentage is naturally born without horns (polled).

In the 19th century, the breeder Ernest Tyssandier d'Escous set about to better the breed by selective breeding.

Originally bred for work, this dual-purpose breed was especially appreciated for its ability to withstand extreme variations in temperature, its fertility, its ease of breeding, its milk (even if the presence of the calf was required to milk it), and its meat. In Cantal, the farmers practise mountain pasture, with the herd passing summer at altitude in the mountains. A female can produce almost 3,000 kg (6,614 lb) of fat-rich milk each year of her life. The milk is traditionally used to produce Appellation d'Origine Contrôlée cheese such as Cantal and Salers cheese, as well as the AOC Fin Gras du Mézenc. The Salers is also used to produce veal calves by cross-breeding with Charolais cattle.

Currently, about 300,000 head of Salers are in France. They are exported to more than 25 countries in Europe, North America, Africa and Oceania.
