= Cantal cheese =

French firm cheese

Cantal
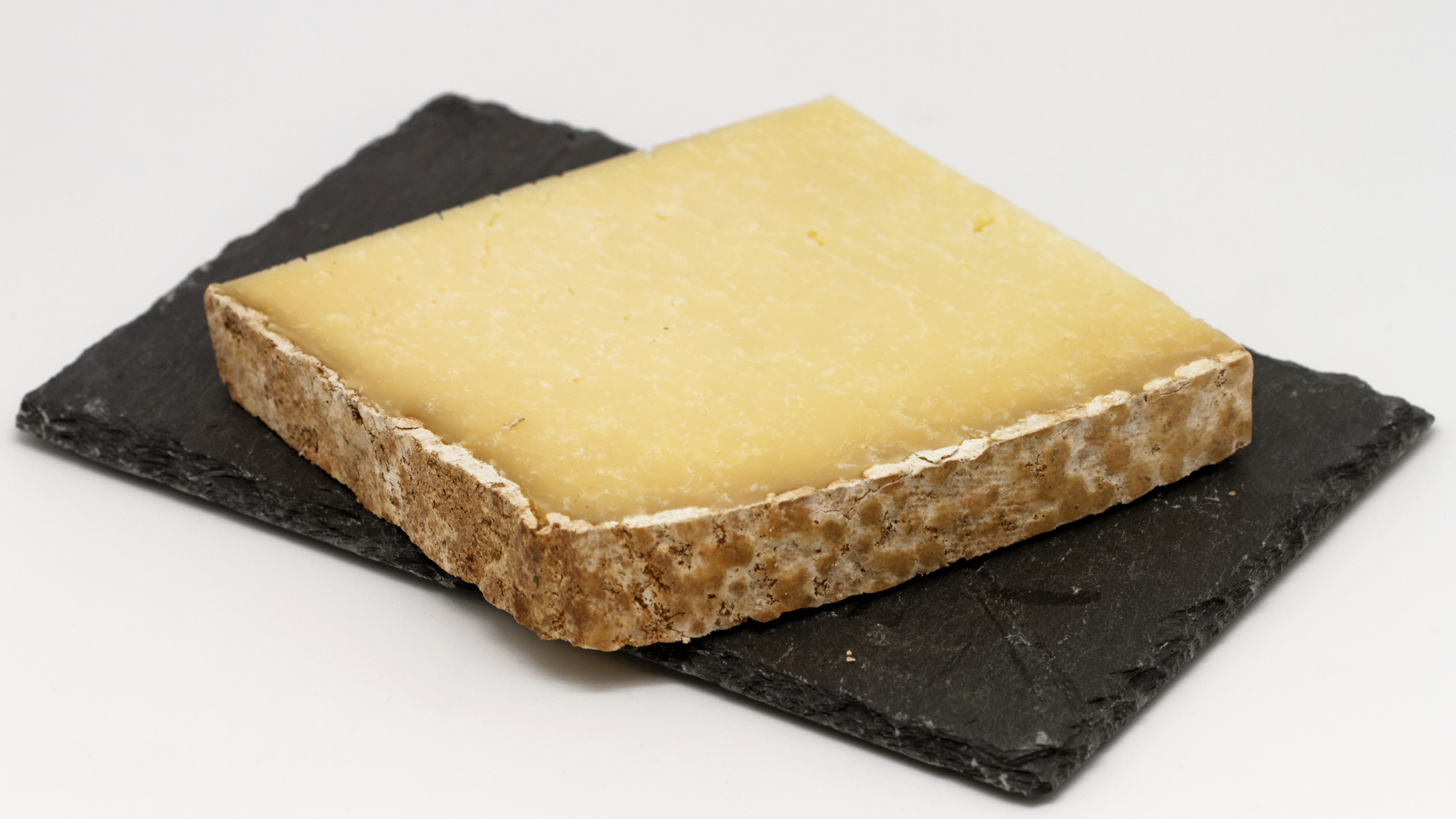
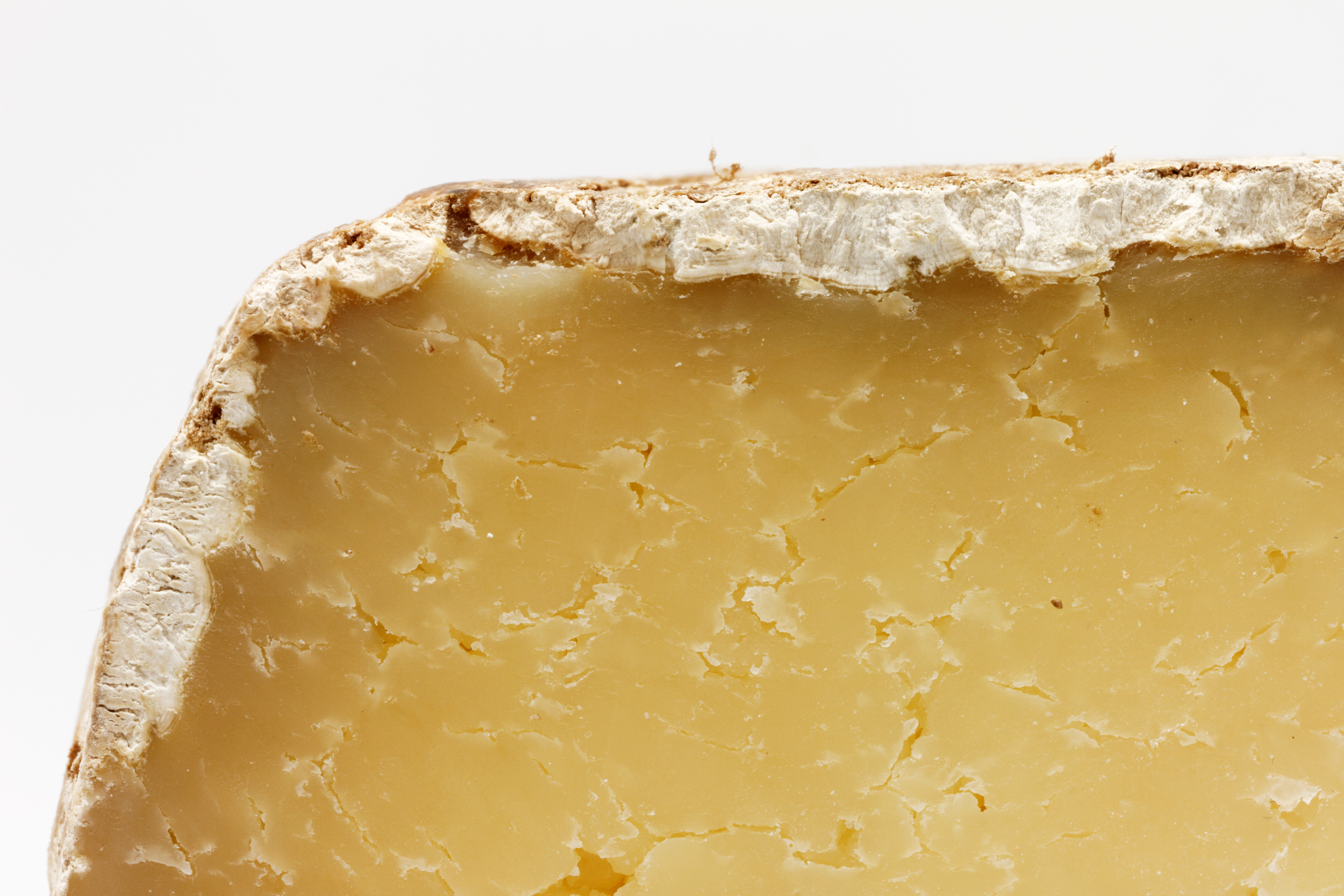
- A rectangular cut of Cantal Close-up view of the rind and texture of Cantal
- Country of origin: France
- Region, town: Cantal
- Source of milk: Raw cows
- Pasteurized: No
- Texture: Semi-hard to hard
- Aging time: At least one month; 1 - >6 months
- Certification: Cantal, Auvergne AOC, 1956 Cantal Entre-deux, Auvergne, AOC, 1986 Cantal Jeune, Auvergne, AOC 1980
- Named after: Cantal mountains

Cantal cheese (French pronunciation: [kɑ̃tal]) is an uncooked firm cheese produced in the Auvergne region of central France: more particularly in the département of Cantal (named after the Cantal mountains) as well as in certain adjoining districts. Cantal cheese was granted Appellation d'Origine Contrôlée certification in 1956. One of the oldest cheeses in France, Cantal dates back to the times of the Gauls. It came to prominence when Marshal Henri de La Ferté-Senneterre served it at the table of Louis XIV. Senneterre is also responsible for the introduction of Saint-Nectaire and Salers.

== Composition ==
There are two types of Cantal cheese: Cantal Fermier, a farmhouse cheese made from raw milk; and Cantal Laitier, a commercial, mass-produced version made from pasteurized milk. Both have to adhere to the same strict quality controls. The cheese is made only using milk from hay-fed Salers cows, and is only harvested from November 15 to April 15. The summer milk of the same cows grazing on mountain meadows makes the Salers cheese.

This semi-hard cheese is aged for several months, and is shaped into a cylinder. The cylinders are massive in size and the cheese has a soft interior. Its flavor is somewhat reminiscent of Cheddar, with a strong, tangy butter taste that grows with age. A well ripened Cantal has a vigorous nutty and tangy taste, while a young cheese has a hint of sweet and buttery taste of raw milk. The pitted appearance of the crust of Cantal vieux is a result of the activity of cheese mites. According to the time of aging, three varieties are distinguished:

- Cantal jeune (aged 1–2 months)
- Cantal entre-deux or Cantal doré (aged 3–9 months)
- Cantal vieux (aged more than 8 months).

These are all available as fermier and laitier. Most (>80% of production) Cantal is of the first two varieties. Cantal vieux is already a hard cheese. If kept properly, it can last up to a year and a half without spoiling. It is not produced in large quantities. Much loved in the Cantal region, Cantal vieux is quite rarely exported due to its strong taste and can usually be found only in specialist stores.

Cantal cheese has a fat content of 45%. It is used in soups, salads, aligot potatoes, cheese fondue and gratins. Cantal Fermier, like all cheeses made from raw milk, may contain Listeria bacteria on the crust, which should therefore be discarded; it is also not suitable for children, pregnant women, the elderly, or immunocompromised persons.

== See also ==
- List of ancient dishes and foods
- List of cheeses
