= Pontremoli =

Pontremoli Pontrémal (Emilian)
- Comune
- Comune di Pontremoli
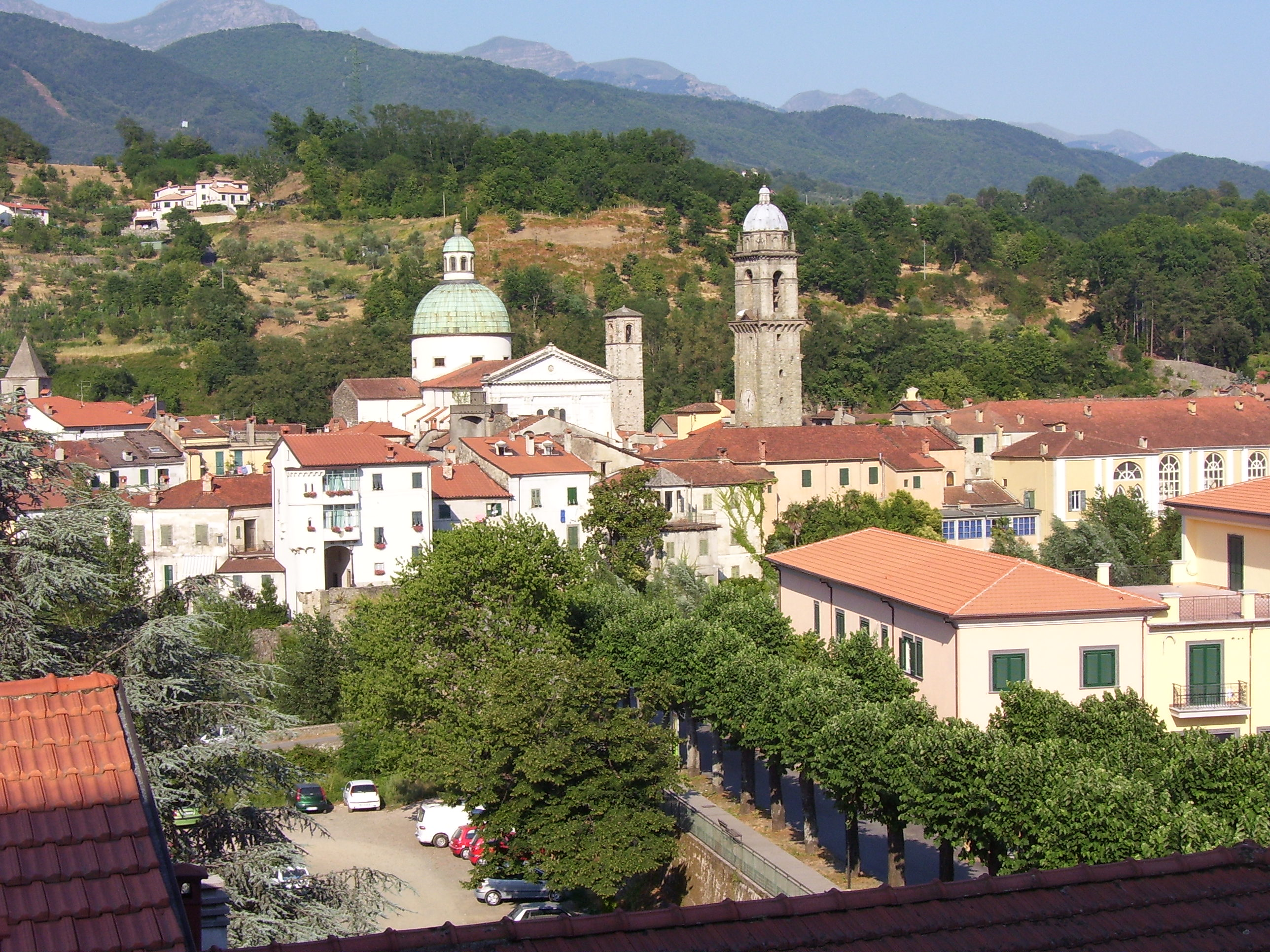

- Coat of arms

- Location within Italy Location within Tuscany
- Coordinates: 44°23′N 09°53′E
- Country: Italy
- Region: Tuscany
- Province: Massa and Carrara (MS)
- Frazioni: See list

Government
  - Mayor: Jacopo Ferri

Area
  - Total: 182 km^{2} (70 sq mi)
- Elevation: 236 m (774 ft)

Population (31 December 2015)
  - Total: 7,357
  - Density: 40.4/km^{2} (105/sq mi)
- Demonym: Pontremolesi
- Time zone: UTC+1 (CET)
  - Summer (DST): UTC+2 (CEST)
- Postal code: 54027
- Dialing code: 0187
- Patron saint: Saint Geminianus
- Saint day: January 31
- Website: Official website

Pontremoli (Italian: [ponˈtrɛːmoli]; local Emilian: Pontrémal; Latin: Apua) is a small city (comune) and former Catholic Episcopal see in the province of Massa and Carrara, Tuscany region, central Italy.

The name Pontremoli means "Trembling Bridge" (from ponte "bridge" and tremare "to tremble"), as the commune was named after a prominent bridge across the Magra.

Pontremoli is in the upper valley of the Magra, 40 kilometres (25 mi) northeast of La Spezia by rail and 90 kilometres (56 mi) south-southwest of Parma.

== History ==
Pontremoli is believed to have been first settled around 1000 BC. It was known in Roman times as Apua. The commune later became an independent municipality in 1226 thanks to Frederick II who chartered the free municipality, partly because of its mountainous terrain. This terrain in the valley of the Magra also made Pontremoli a target for numerous conquests from rival Italian and foreign lords. Pontremoli was controlled by various aristocratic families, including the Malaspina (in 1319) and the Antelminelli (in 1322). The conflict between the rival Guelfi and Ghibellini factions in the early fourteenth century resulted in the construction of the Great Bell Tower (Il Campanone) to separate the rival camps. During these Medieval times Pontremoli was often visited by pilgrims travelling from Canterbury (England) to Rome.

In 1331 Pontremoli was sold by John I of Bohemia to Mastino II della Scala (Lord of Verona). Pontremoli was later taken over by the Visconti of Milan in 1339. In 1404 the ownership of Pontremoli once again changed hands as it was seized by the Fieschi family of Genoa. However, by 1433 Pontremoli was again under the control of the Milanese. In 1495 Pontremoli was sacked by the troops of Charles VIII of France. During this time Pontremoli was a territory owned by the House of Sforza, who were the new Dukes of Milan.

Pontremoli was a French territory from 1508 until 1522 as several northern Italian areas were conquered. In 1526, Pontremoli was captured by Charles V of the Holy Roman Empire. Pontremoli was controlled by Spain until 1647, when it was bought by the Republic of Genoa. Three years later, Pontremoli was made part of the (Medici) Grand Duchy of Tuscany. With the Leopoldine reforms, Pontremoli became an autonomous community (whilst still part of the Grand Duchy of Tuscany) in 1777. In 1778, it officially became a City. It stayed as part of Tuscany (with the exception of a period of French control from 1805 to 1814) until it was transferred to Parma as part of a land exchange in 1847. The area was heavily damaged by an earthquake in 1834. In November 1847 Pontremoli was occupied (along with Fivizzano) by the Duke of Modena, due to a dispute over trade routes. It joined the wars of Italian unification and became part of the unified Kingdom of Italy in the middle of the 19th century.

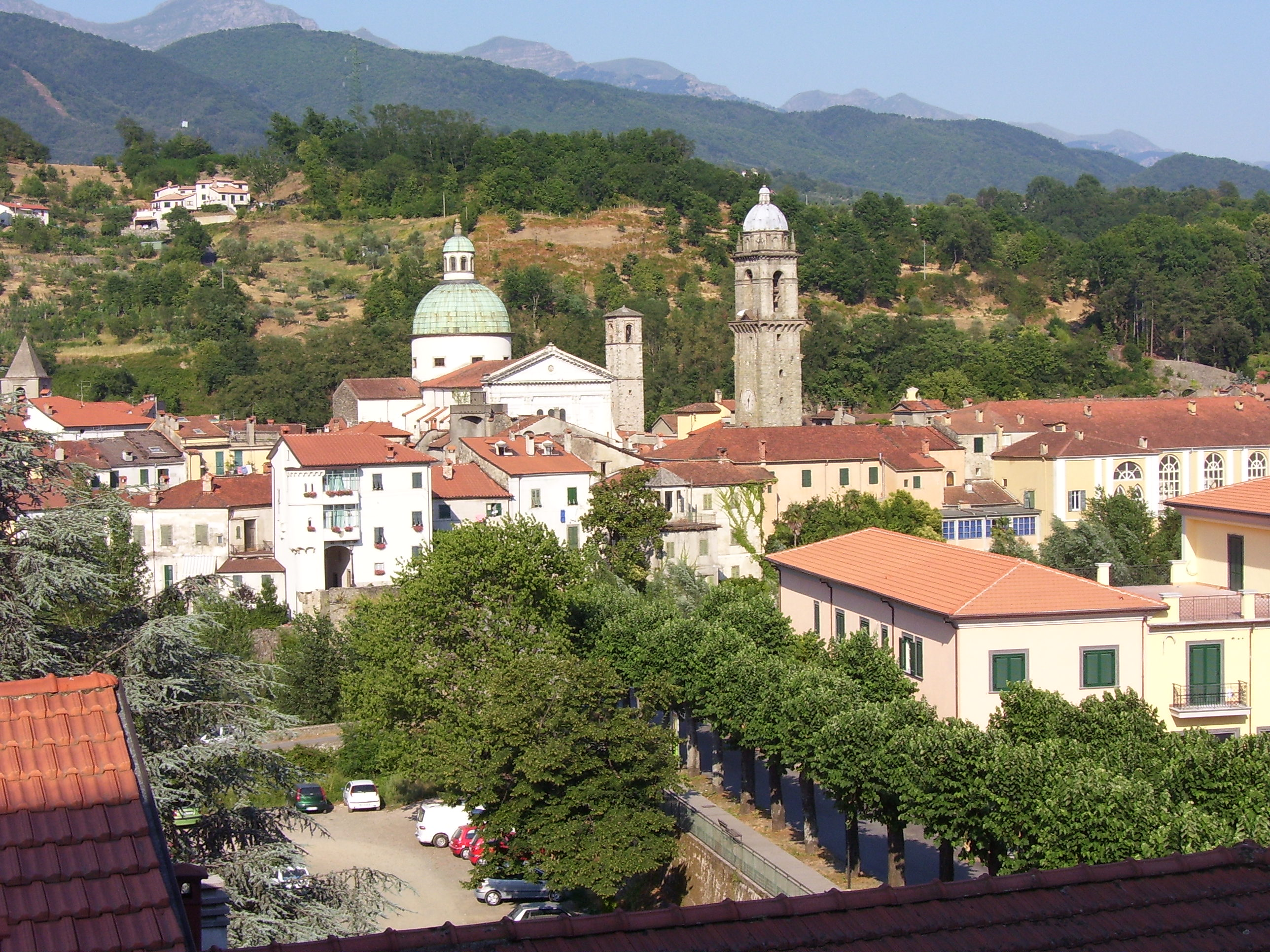
View of the city skyline showing Il Duomo (cathedral) and Il Campanone (bell tower)

== Frazioni ==
There are 30 frazioni (English civil parishes: neighborhoods or outlying villages legally part of the commune government) in Pontremoli. They are, ordered alphabetically:

Arzelato, Arzengio, Baselica, Bassone, Braia, Bratto, Careola, Cargalla, Casa Corvi, Casalina, Cavezzana d'Antena, Cavezzana Gordana, Ceretoli, Cervara, Dozzano, Gravagna, Grondola, Groppodalosio, Guinadi, Mignegno, Montelungo, Navola, Oppilo, Pieve di Saliceto, Pracchiola San Cristoforo, Succisa, Teglia, Torrano, Traverde and Vignola.

== Main sights ==
Among the churches in Pontremoli are:

- San Nicolò which houses a wooden cross, dating back several centuries
- Chiesa Cattedrale Santa Maria Assunta: the Duomo, built in the 17th century and at one time dedicated to Saint Geminianus - the cathedral holds many valuable sculptures and paintings. The dome of this cathedral, along with Il Campanone (the bell tower), dominates the city skyline.
- SS. Annunziata with its Augustinian monastery and painted mural is another notable feature within the area.

There are also several buildings concerned with the past noble families of Pontremoli. The major site is the Castello del Piagnaro, one of the largest castles of Lunigiana. Several palaces, such as those of the houses of Malaspina and Dosi, are located within the commune.

The "Museo delle Statue Stele" (situated within the castle) contains a number of Bronze Age stone sculptures representing human figures found in Lunigiana.

== Culture ==
More modern attractions of Pontremoli include the annual Premio Bancarella book festival, Medievalis (during August) which is a recollection of the arrival of Emperor Frederick II in Pontremoli in 1226.

There are also several mineral springs in the surrounding mountains and a local market takes place on Wednesdays and Saturdays.

=== Cuisine ===
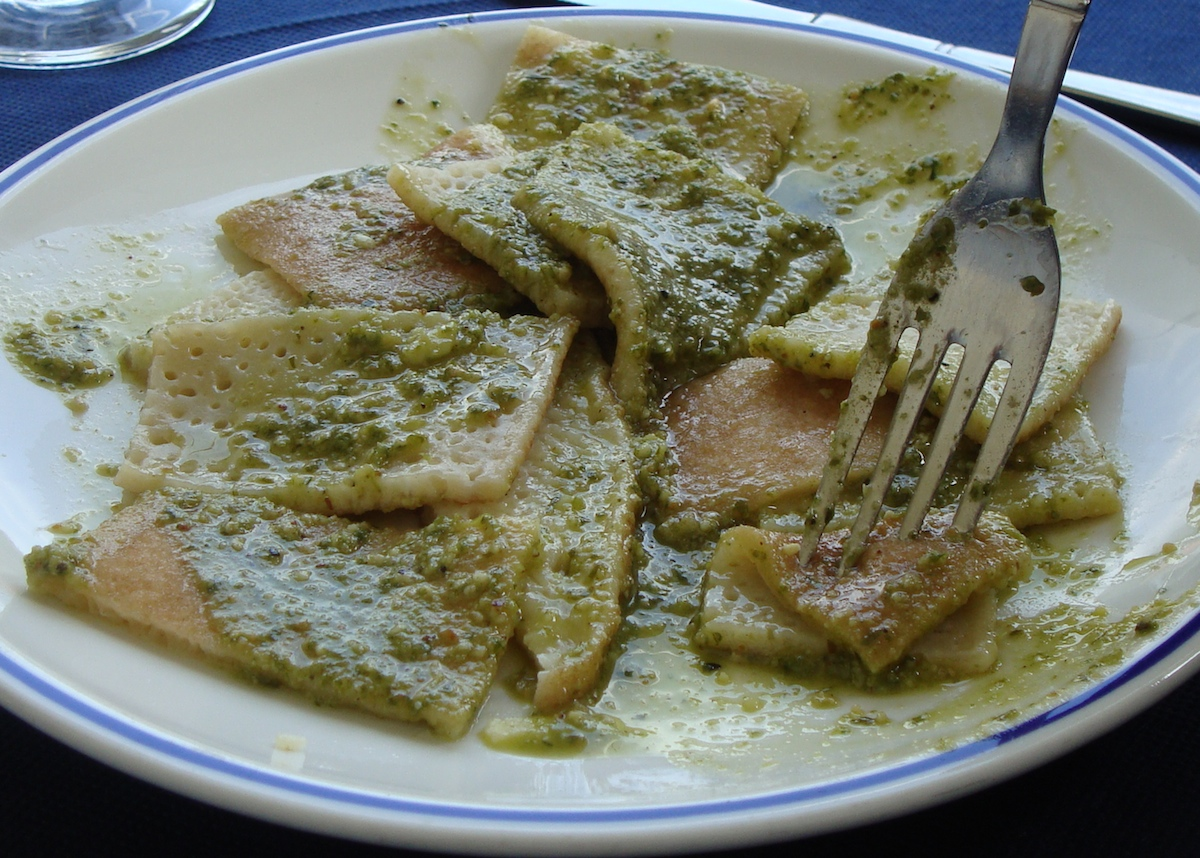
A plate of testaroli with pesto served in a trattoria (restaurant) in Pontremoli

Local foods unique to Pontremoli include "amor" (a type of small cake, consisting of a creamy filling between wafers), "spongata" (a Christmas cake containing chocolate, honey and hazelnuts, among other ingredients), "torta d'erbe" a pie filled with a mixture which may include bietole (Swiss chard), eggs, ricotta cheese, potato, rice and parmigiano cheese wrapped in a very thin pastry; and testaroli, a flat baked pasta, often served with pesto. (Note: "Yet in Pontremoli there is not a single restaurant that does not offer testaroli, morning and evening, daily brought fresh from the villages surrounding the town, at midday and the evening as well.") Many have suggested that testaroli was actually the first type of pasta. According to an article published by The Wall Street Journal, testaroli is "the earliest recorded pasta."

== Infrastructure and transport ==
To reach Pontremoli by car, one can exit at the toll booth of the same name on the A15 motorway Parma-La Spezia or take the Cisa State Road 62. Public road transport is available via the CAT company, which connects Pontremoli to other cities and towns in the Lunigiana area, Massa, Carrara, and La Spezia.

Pontremoli has a railway station with regular services to Pisa, La Spezia and Parma. Pontremoli railway station is located along the Parma-La Spezia line.

== Notable people ==
In 1802, explorer Alessandro Malaspina took up residence within this area. Mathematician and poet Luigi Poletti, was born in Pontremoli; there is now a road within the city named in his honour. Football player Enrico Albertosi was born in the town. Currently, Italian singer Zucchero owns a house in the commune.

== Sister cities ==
Pontremoli is twinned with:

- Trenčianske Teplice, Slovakia
- Morières-lès-Avignon, France
- Noto, Italy

== See also ==
- List of Catholic dioceses in Italy
