= Apicius (disambiguation) =

Apicius is the title of the oldest surviving Roman cookbook, usually said to have been compiled in the 4th or 5th century AD.

Apicius may also refer to:

- Apicius (1st century BC) - lived during the Roman Republic
- Marcus Gavius Apicius - the second and most famous, lived at the time of the emperor Tiberius
- Apicius (2nd century AD) - lived at the time of the Emperor Trajan
- The name also occurs in the title Apici Excerpta ("Extracts from Apicius") of a completely different Latin cookbook attributed to Vinidarius
- Restaurant Apicius - Dutch Michelin-starred restaurant
