= Placenta cake =

Layered dessert from classical antiquity

Placenta
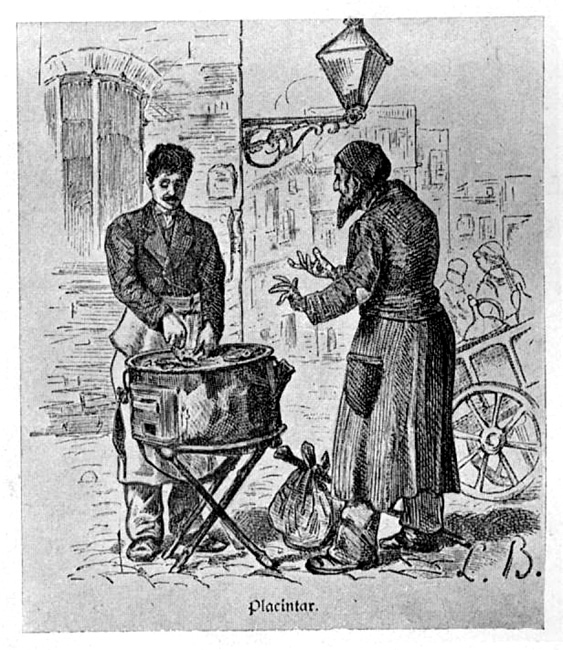
- A Greek plăcintă-maker in Bucharest in 1880
- Type: Pie
- Place of origin: Ancient Greece
- Main ingredients: Flour and semolina dough, cheese, honey, bay leaves

Placenta cake is a dish from ancient Greece and Rome consisting of layers alternating between dough and cheese (such as ricotta) mixed with honey. It is flavored with bay leaves, baked, and then covered in additional honey. The dessert is mentioned in classical texts such as the Greek poems of Archestratos and Antiphanes, as well as the De agri cultura of Cato the Elder. It is thought to be related to baklava.

== Etymology ==
The Latin word placenta is derived from the Greek plakous (Ancient Greek: πλακοῦς, gen. πλακοῦντος – plakountos, from πλακόεις – plakoeis, "flat") for thin or layered flat breads.

The placenta of mammalian pregnancy is so named from the perceived resemblance between its shape and that of a placenta cake.

== History ==
Most claim that placenta, and therefore likely baklava derived from a recipe from Ancient Greece. Homer's Odyssey, written around 800 BC, mentions thin breads sweetened with walnuts and honey. In the fifth century BC, Philoxenos states in his poem "Dinner" that, in the final drinking course of a meal, hosts would prepare and serve cheesecake made with milk and honey that was baked into a pie.

An early Greek language mention of plakous as a dessert (or second table delicacy) comes from the poems of Archestratos. He describes plakous as served with nuts and dried fruits and commends the honey-drenched Athenian version of plakous.

Antiphanes (fl. 4th century BC), a contemporary of Archestratos, provided an ornate description of plakous with wheat flour and goat's cheese as key ingredients:

The streams of the tawny bee, mixed with the curdled river of bleating she-goats, placed upon a flat receptacle of the virgin daughter of Demeter [honey, cheese, flour], delighting in ten thousand delicate toppings – or shall I simply say plakous? I'm for plakous' (Antiphanes quoted by Athenaeus).

Later, in 160 BC, Cato the Elder provided a recipe for placenta in his De agri cultura which Andrew Dalby considers, along with Cato's other dessert recipes, to be in the "Greek tradition", and possibly copied from a Greek cookbook.

Shape the placenta as follows: place a single row of tracta along the whole length of the base dough. This is then covered with the mixture [cheese and honey] from the mortar. Place another row of tracta on top and go on doing so until all the cheese and honey have been used up. Finish with a layer of tracta...place the placenta in the oven and put a preheated lid on top of it [...] When ready, honey is poured over the placenta. (Cato the Elder, De Agri Cultura)

Food writer Mark Kurlansky describes Cato's recipe as incomprehensible and resulting in an inedible dish if followed literally. However, experimental reconstruction in 2024 by Morton and Schlick successfully reproduced Cato's placenta, finding it both structurally successful and palatable, demonstrating that the recipe is workable when its ingredients and techniques are interpreted in their historical context.

== Legacy ==
A number of modern scholars suggest that the Greco-Roman dessert's Eastern Roman (Byzantine) descendants, plakountas tetyromenous ("cheesy placenta") and koptoplakous (Byzantine Greek: κοπτοπλακοῦς), are the ancestors of modern tiropita (or banitsa) and baklava respectively. The name plakous (Greek: πλακοῦς) is used today on the island of Lesbos in Greece to describe a baklava-type dessert of layered pastry leaves containing crushed nuts that is baked and then covered in honey. The dough for this modern placenta is made with thin leaves of crumbly pastry dough soaked in simple syrup. Ouzo is added to the dough.

Through its Byzantine Greek name plakountos, the dessert was adopted into Armenian cuisine as plagindi, plagunda, and pghagund (Armenian: պլագինդի, պլագունդա, պղագունդ), "all cakes of bread and honey." From the latter term came the later Arabic name iflaghun, which is mentioned in the medieval Arab cookbook Wusla ila al-habib as a specialty of the Cilician Armenians settled in southern Asia Minor and settled in the neighboring Crusader kingdoms of northern Syria. Thus, the dish may have traveled to the Levant in the Middle Ages via the Armenians, many of whom migrated there following the first appearance of the Turkish tribes in medieval Anatolia.

Other variants of the Greco-Roman dish survived into the modern era in the form of the Romanian plăcintă (a baked flat pastry containing cheese) and the Viennese palatschinke (a very thinly made crepe-like pancake; also common in the Balkans, Central and Eastern Europe).

== See also ==
- Libum
- Nougat, sometimes credited to the Greeks and Romans from firmer forms of similar recipes
- List of breads
- List of pastries
