= Apicius (1st century BC) =

Ancient Roman

Apicius is the name of a Roman lover of luxury who lived in the 90s BC and was said to have outdone all his contemporaries in lavish expenditure. According to Poseidonius, Apicius was responsible for the banishment from Rome of Rutilius Rufus, who was the author of a history of Rome written in Greek and was notable for the modesty of his entertaining.

As Tertullian observes, this early Apicius gave his name to a series of later gourmets and cooks, notably Marcus Gavius Apicius and a slightly later Apicius who lived in the 2nd century AD. Apicius was not transmitted as a family name, but was apparently applied as a nickname, meaning "gourmand". For the same reason, the name of Apicius was eventually thought appropriate for a cookbook, and as such was applied both to the late Roman cookery text currently known as Apicius and to the quite different and much briefer Excerpta Apicii ("Abridged Apicius") ascribed to Vinidarius.

== Notes ==
=== Other sources ===
- Poseidonius fragment 27 Jacoby, quoted by Athenaeus, Deipnosophistae 4.168d
- Tertullian, Apologeticus 3.6

== Bibliography ==
- Dalby, Andrew (2003), Food in the Ancient World from A to Z, London, New York: Routledge, ISBN 0-415-23259-7 p. 16
