= Palatschinke =

Type of pancake

Palačinka
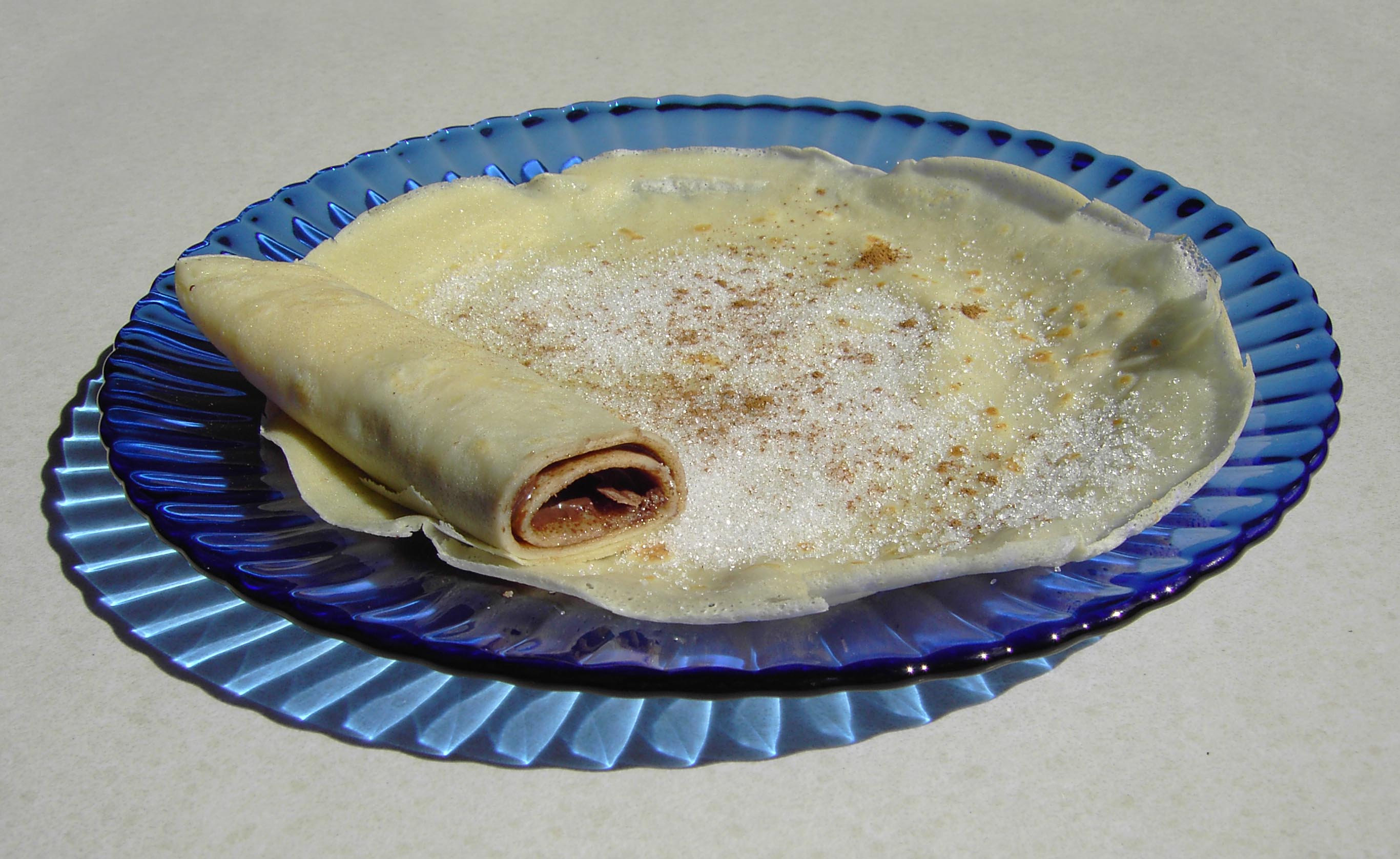
- Ordinary palačinka, sprinkled with sugar
- Alternative names: Palačinka, palacinka, palacsinta, palaccinka, clătite, scoverzi
- Type: Pancake
- Place of origin: Greco-Roman world
- Main ingredients: eggs, wheat flour, milk

Palatschinke, palačinka, or palacsinta, is a thin crêpe-like variety of pancake of Greco-Roman origin. The dessert is common in Southeastern and Central Europe.

== History and etymology ==
The dish is of Greco-Roman origin. In 350 BCE, the ancient Greek poets Archestratos and Antiphanes first mentioned plakous. Cato the Elder's short work De agri cultura ("On Farming") from about 160 BCE includes an elaborate recipe for placenta. Palatschinke still bears the same name of its Greek and Roman ancestors.

The name comes from the Latin word placenta, which in turn is derived from the Greek word plakous for thin or layered flat breads. The name of the dish has followed a track of borrowing across several languages of Central and Southeastern Europe; the dish originates in the Roman era, and the Austrian-German term Palatschinke, the Czech palačinka, the Slovak palacinka, and the Croatian-Serb palačinka are deemed to have been borrowed from Hungarian palacsinta, that in turn from Romanian plăcintă (a cake, a pie), the Romanian word can be traced back to the Latin placenta, meaning "pie, cake".

Palačinka is also the name in most West- and South-Slavic languages (Slovak palacinka, Bosnian, Bulgarian, Czech, Croatian, Montenegrin, Macedonian, Pannonian Rusyn, Serbian, Slovenian palačinka, палачинка). Subcarpathian Rusyn uses the name палачінта (palačinta).

In Polish, the equivalent is called a naleśnik, in Ukrainian налисник (nalysnyk) or млинець (mlynec), in Russian налистник (nalistnik) or блинчик (blinchik), in Romanian clătită/scoverzi.

It is also popular among the Jewish community.

== Versions ==
Palatschinken (palačinke) are thin pancakes similar to the French crêpe. The main difference between the French and Central European versions of the dish is that the mixture for palatschinken can be used straight away unlike that of crepes which is suggested to be left at rest for several hours. Palatschinken are made by creating a batter from eggs, wheat flour, milk, and salt and frying it in a pan with butter or oil. Unlike thicker types of pancakes, palatschinken are usually served with different types of fillings and eaten for lunch or dinner.

Palatschinken are traditionally rolled with apricot, strawberry, or plum jam, and sprinkled with confectioner's sugar. A variety of fruit sauces (like apple sauce), or thick fruit butters called lekvar (plum, prune, raspberry, cherry or sour cherry jam), lemon juice and sugar, chocolate sauce, hazelnut-chocolate cream, almonds, dried or fresh fruits, sweet cottage or quark cheese and raisins, cocoa powder, poppy seed, are common modern ingredients.

Palatschinkentorte, palačinka torta and rakott palacsinta are layered pancakes, comparable to the French mille crêpes.

=== Palacsinta ===
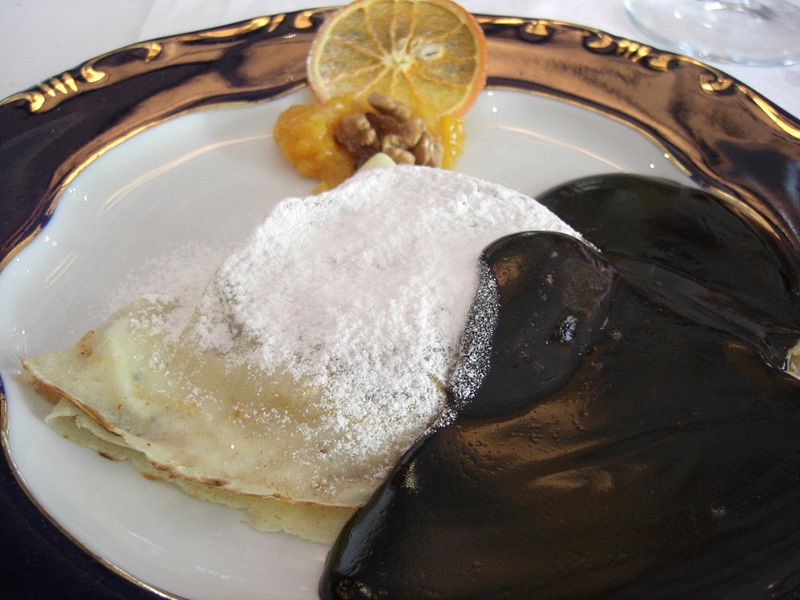
Gundel Palacsinta filled with walnuts and chocolate sauce

A well-known Hungarian version of palatschinke is the Gundel pancake (Gundel palacsinta), made with ground walnuts, raisin, candied orange peel, cinnamon, and rum filling, served flambéed in dark chocolate sauce made with egg yolks, heavy cream, and cocoa.

Rakott palacsinta is a traditional Hungarian crêpe cake, commonly made from up to 30 tiers of palacsinta. Fillings may include sweet cottage cheese, jam, walnuts and poppyseeds, rolled up and layered in a casserole dish and baked.

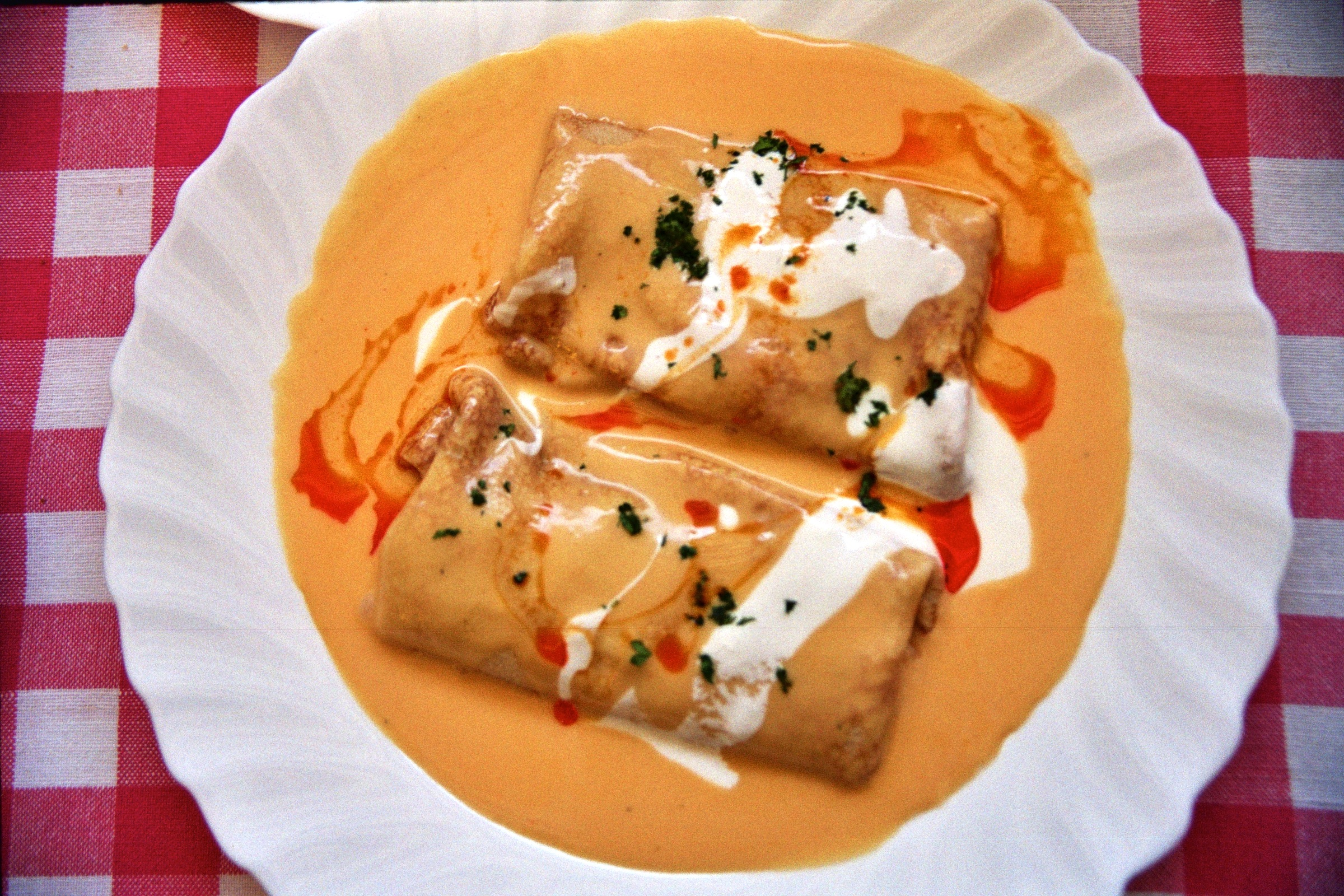
Hortobágyi palacsinta filled with meat, served in Sopron, Hungary

Palatschinken may also be eaten unsweetened as a main course, such as the Hungarian meat-filled Hortobágyi palacsinta. They may also be eaten plain, with vegetables such as mushroom, spinach or sauerkraut, or with cheese, topped with sour cream.

== See also ==
- Blini
- Blintz
- Plăcintă
- Kaiserschmarrn
- List of pancakes
