= Coan wine =

Grecian alcoholic beverage

Coan wine is wine from the Greek island of Kos, and in particular a style of wine invented there in classical antiquity that was known for its saltiness.

== History ==
This distinctively salty style of wine was, according to Pliny, invented accidentally by a slave, who added sea water to the must to meet his production quota. The result apparently became popular, and was imitated by neighboring wine makers, such as those on Rhodes. From about the 4th century BC, it began to be exported in large quantities. Since the addition of salt water tended to mask any local distinctiveness, other regions even began manufacturing amphorae in the Coan style in which to ship their imitations of Coan-style wine, meaning that by some point "Coan wine" became a generic term for a style of wine that was in fact made in many different locations.

The wine's reputation was quite good in classical Greece—Strabo mentions it alongside the well-regarded Chian and Lesbian wines. The connoisseurs of ancient Rome, however, preferred wines without sea water added, and both Pliny and Galen strongly recommend unadulterated wines such as those of Chios.

== Production ==
Two accounts of the production of Coan-style wine survive, one given by Cato the Elder in De agri cultura, and the other, attributed to Berytius, in the Byzantine collection Geoponica. Cato's recipe is as follows:

Recipe for Coan Wine: Take sea-water at a distance from the shore, where fresh water does not come, when the sea is calm and no wind is blowing, seventy days before vintage. After taking is from the sea, pour into a jar, filling it not fully but to within 5 quadrantals of the top. Cover the jar, leaving space for air, and thirty days later pour it slowly and carefully into another jar, leaving the sediment in the bottom. Twenty days later pour in the same way into a third jar, and leave until vintage. Allow the grapes from which you intend to make the Coan wine to remain in the vine, let them ripen thoroughly, and pick them when they have dried after a rain. Place them in the sun for two days, or in the open for three days, unless it is raining, in which case put them under cover in baskets; clear out any berries which have rotted. The take the above-mentioned sea-water and pour 10 quadrantals into a jar holding 50; then pick the berries of ordinary grapes from the stem into the jar until you have filled it. Press the berries with the hand so that they may soak in the sea-water. When the jar is full, cover it, leaving space for air, and three days later remove the grapes from the jar, treat out in the pressing-room, and store the wine in jars which have been washed clean and dried.

— Cato the Elder, De agri cultura

Two alternate recipes are attributed to Berytius. The first prescribes boiling 3 parts must and 1 part sea water down to two thirds. The other prescribes starting with 2 metretai white wine and mixing into it: 1 cup (~240 mL) salt, 3 cups (~720 mL) hepsetos (that is, grape must that has been concentrated by boiling), 1 cup (~240 mL) vetch flour, 100 drachmai (~437 g) melilot (sweet clover), 16 (~70 g) drachmai apples, and 16 drachmai (~70 g) Celtic nard.

== See also ==
- Ancient Greece and wine
