= Urda (cheese) =

Type of whey cheese

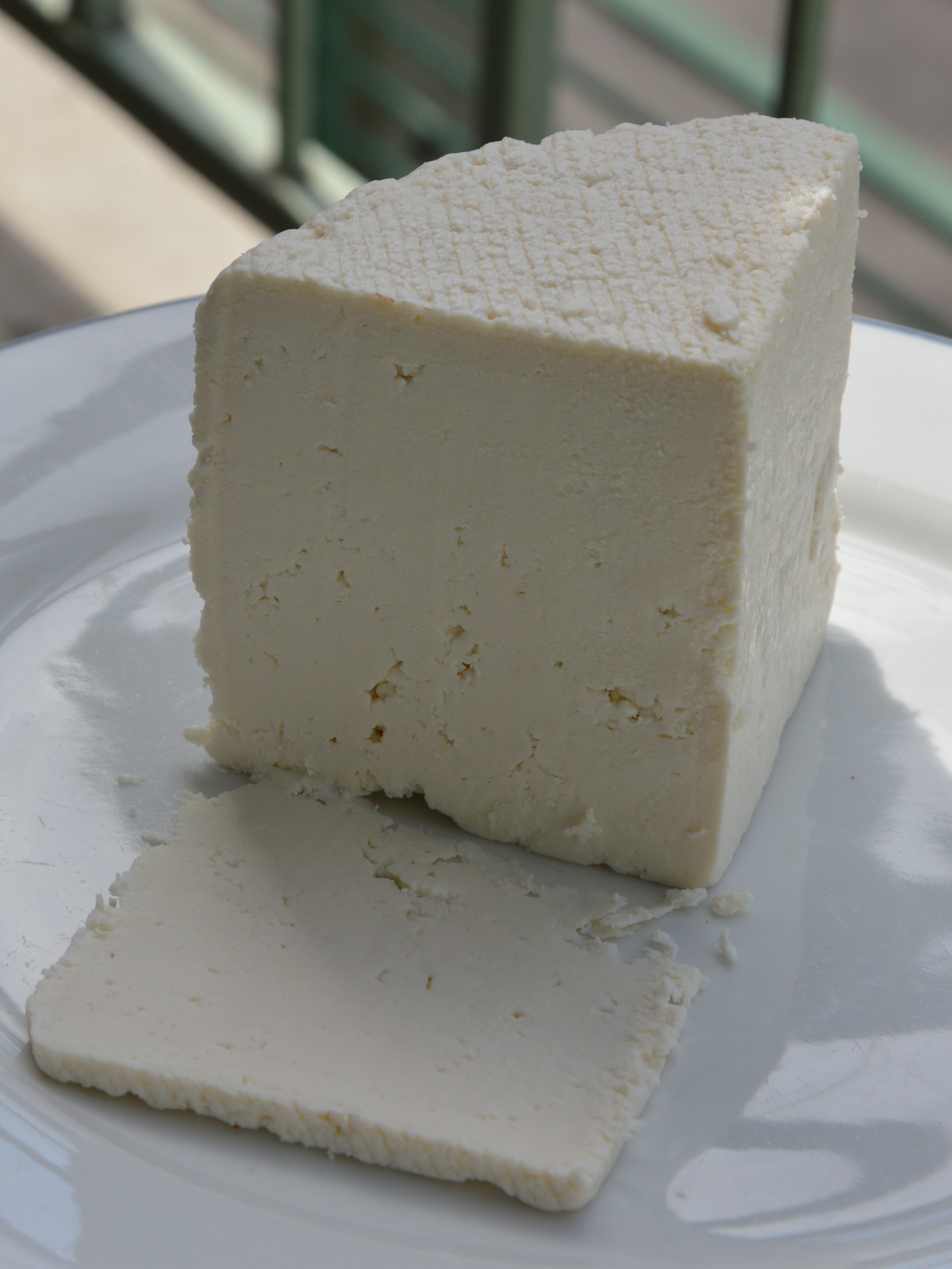
- Other names: Urdha, Urdă, Vurda, Orda, Izvara, Zsendice
- Country of origin: Albania, Bulgaria, Hungary, Kosovo, Moldova, North Macedonia, Romania, Serbia, Ukraine
- Region: Balkans
- Source of milk: Cow, Sheep, Goat
- Pasteurized: Traditionally, no
- Texture: Fresh

Urda (Albanian: urdha, indefinite form: urdhë; Bulgarian: урда, извара, romanized: urda, izvara; Macedonian: урда, изварка, romanized: urda, izvarka; Romanian: urdă; Serbian: вурда / vurda; Ukrainian: вурда, romanized: vurda; Hungarian: orda, zsendice) is a whey cheese commonly produced in Southeast Europe, and Hungary.

== Etymology ==
The name derives from Albanian urdhë/urdha, from Proto-Albanian *wurdā, from an earlier form *urdā or *uordā, ultimately derived from Proto-Indo-European *uer- "to boil, to burn". It is cognate to Old Armenian վառիմ (vaṙim, "to burn"), Lithuanian vìrti ("to cook, to boil"). It is semantically relevant that this cheese is produced by boiling whey. The Albanian term urdhë/urdha has been borrowed to other Balkan and Carpathian languages, notably Romanian urdă, but also Bulgarian, Hungarian, Serbian, Slovak, Rusyn, Polish, Czech, and Russian languages.

== Production ==
Urda is made from whey of sheep, goat or cow milk. Urda is produced by heating the whey resulting from the draining of any type of cheese. It is often made into molds to the shape of a half sphere. The paste is finely grained, silky and palatable. It contains 18 grams of protein per 100 grams.

Urda is similar to ricotta in the way it is produced.

== Common uses ==
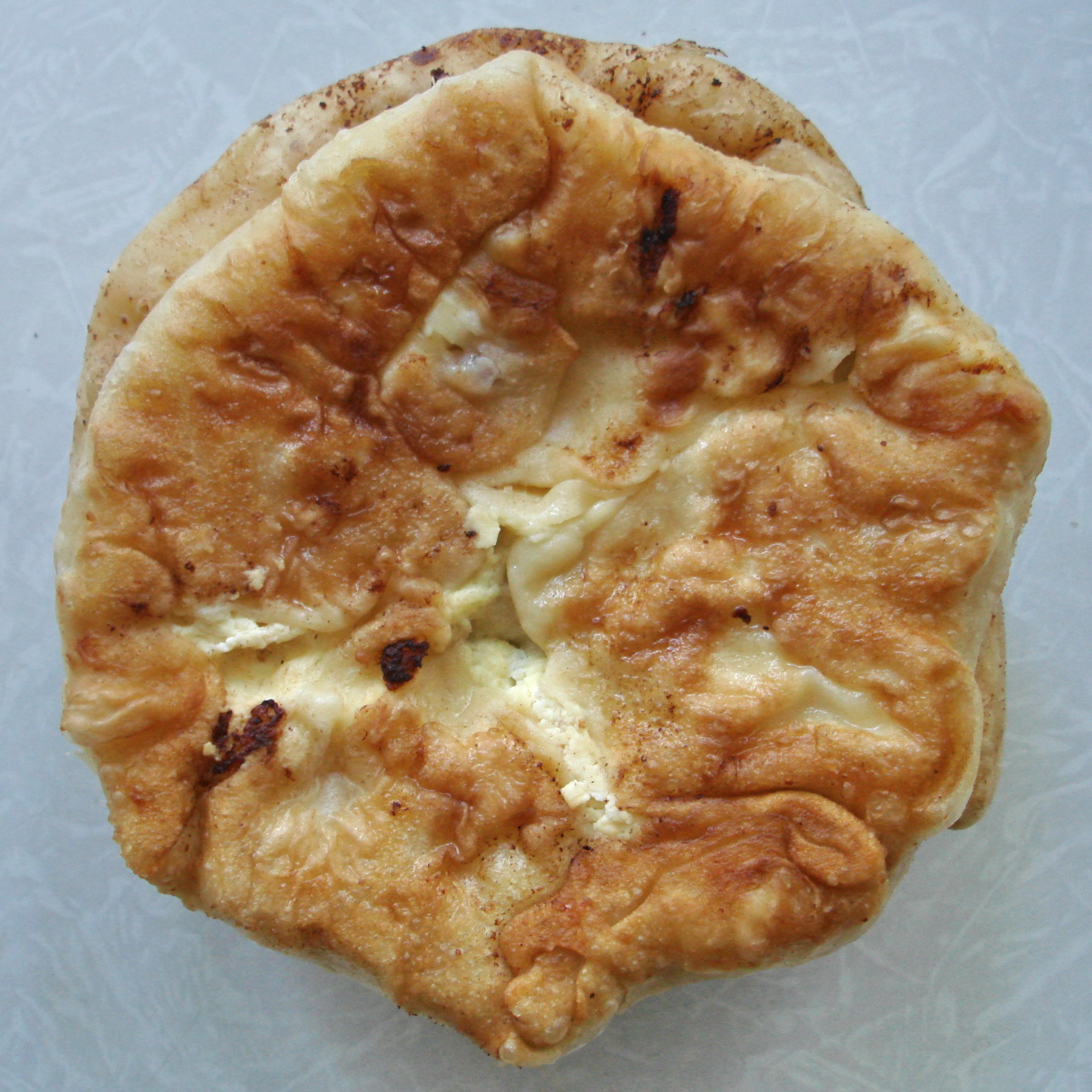
Plăcintă is commonly eaten with Urda.

In Romania, urda is traditionally used in the preparation of several desserts, such as clătită and plăcintă. Urda is very popular in Northeast part of Serbia — Banat.

Hungarians traditionally use it as ingredients of desserts, commonly make it into bukta (ordás bukta) and ordás palacsinta.

== See also ==
- Quark (dairy product)
- Cottage cheese
- List of cheeses
