= Libum =

Cheesecake from classical antiquity

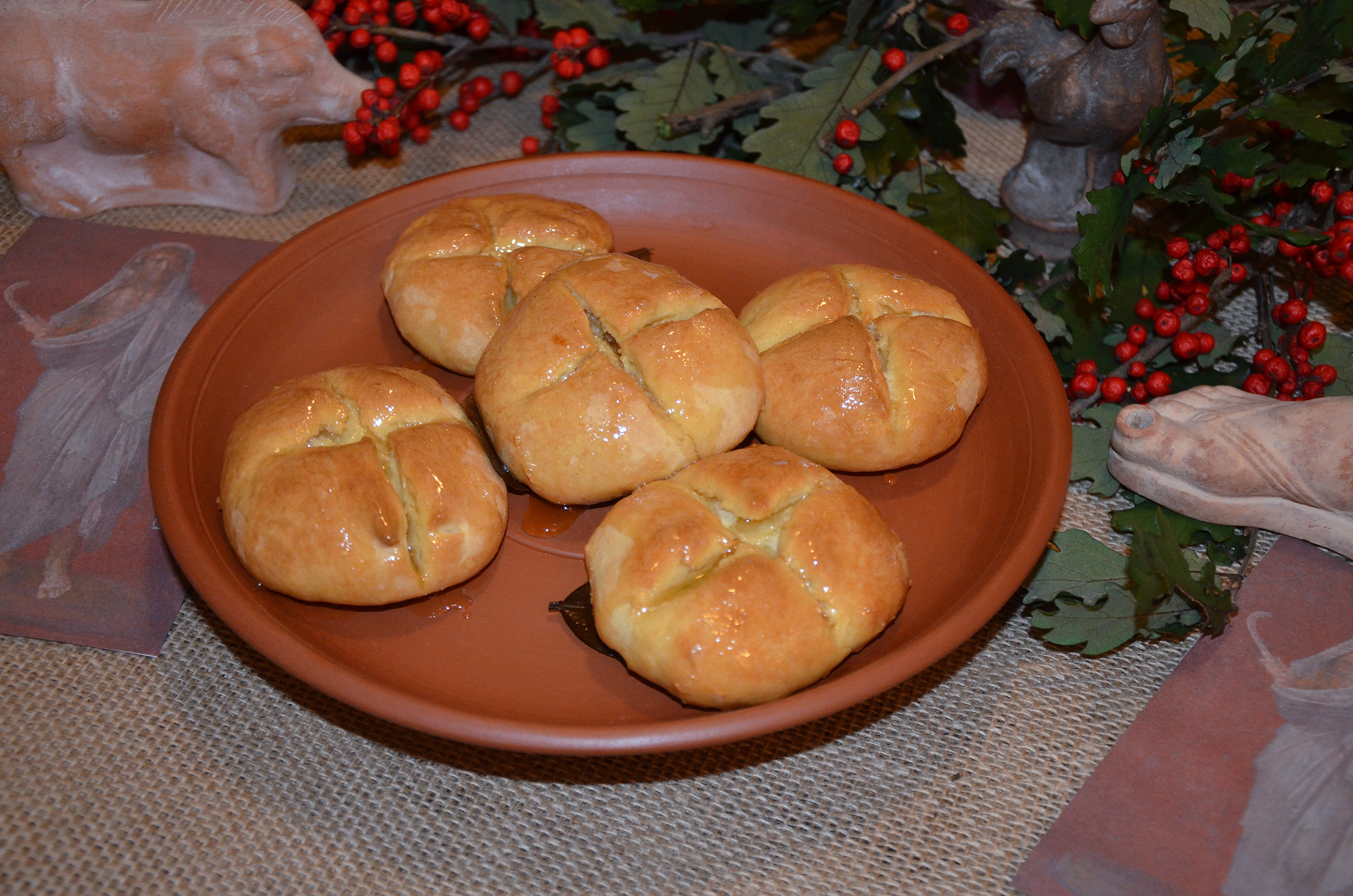
Libum made using Cato the Elder's recipe

Libum was a cake prepared in antiquity that was closely associated with honey. Besides referencing a specific cake, libum came to be used as a name for cakes in general.

== Sacrificial role ==
When referenced as a specific cake, libum appears to have been the most common offering of all Roman cakes. The use of cakes as sacrifices was not new to Roman society—they had been used for such purposes since at least the time of the Greeks. Ovid gives a description of the cake in such a context, describing the cake as an offering to Vesta, the goddess of the hearth, and traces the origin of the cake to the discovery of honey by Bacchus, the god of wine. The name itself references the role in sacrifices, deriving from the Latin libare, "to offer to the gods", and is first referenced in the poem Annales, written by Ennius.

== General consumption ==
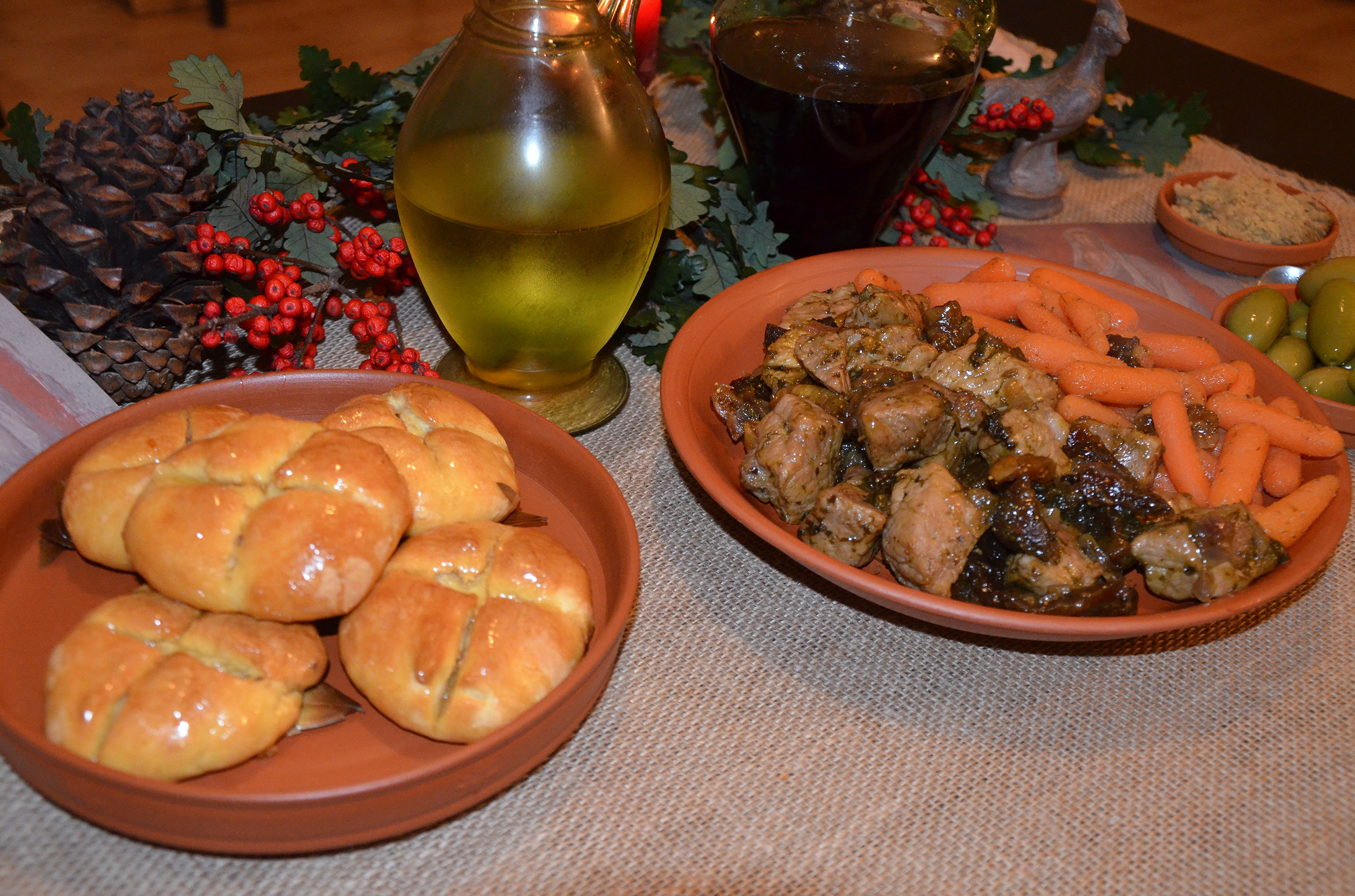
Libum depicted in a recreation of a Saturnalia feast

With sugar not yet available to Roman society and butter only considered suitable as a healing balm, honey was used as the basic sweetener and cheese was used as a source of fat. Combining the two was typical among desserts, as also seen in the more complex placenta cake.

Preparations varied—the version described by Ovid contained millet, while the version referenced by Athenaeus contained itriya, a shaped, proto-pasta made from wheat flour. The resulting cake could be served in a range of contexts: more hearty versions at home, and more delicate preparations at the end of formal dinners.

== Cato's recipe ==
While libum is referenced by various Roman poets, the only recipe given in antiquity comes from Cato the Elder, in his treatise De agri cultura circa 160 BCE. Cato presents a basic dish that combined flour and cheese curds:

Libum hoc modo facito. Casei P. II bene disterat in mortario. Ubi bene distriverit, farinae siligineae libram aut, si voles tenerius esse, selibram similaginis eodem indito permiscetoque cum caseo bene. Ovum unum addito et una permisceto bene. Inde panem facito, folia subdito, in foco caldo sub testu coquito leniter.
Recipe for libum: Bray 2 pounds of cheese thoroughly in a mortar; when it is thoroughly macerated, add 1 pound of wheat flour, or, if you wish the cake to be more dainty, ½ pound of fine flour, and mix thoroughly with the cheese. Add 1 egg, and work the whole well. Pat out a loaf, place on leaves, and bake slowly on a warm hearth under a crock.

Cato cooked his libum on bay leaves. These, writes Ernestine Leon, flavored the cake as it cooked, and would have served the same role as modern parchment paper. For the latter role to work, Leon infers the leaves "must have been" dry as wet leaves would have stuck to the baked cake. Baking the cake using feta and modern kitchen equipment, Andrew Dalby and Sally Grainger report Cato's recipe makes a "delicious savoury cheesecake" with a "golden-brown crust and soft centre". Likewise, Leon reports the resulting cake is "palatable", and notes that while the amount of cheese may seem "excessive", its ratio to other ingredients is close to that of shortening and flour in the modern shortbread. The lack of honey in Cato's recipe was unique among ancient references to the cake; and Dalby and Grainger suggest inclusion may have been implied. Such a recipe modified to include honey, they advise the modern cook, would be more appetising made with a less salty cheese like ricotta.

It is unclear why Cato presented a recipe for cake recipes in a text on agriculture: theories include that it could offer some farmers an extra source of income, or that they were included for their role in religious rituals.

A preparation of libum using Cato's recipe, including honey

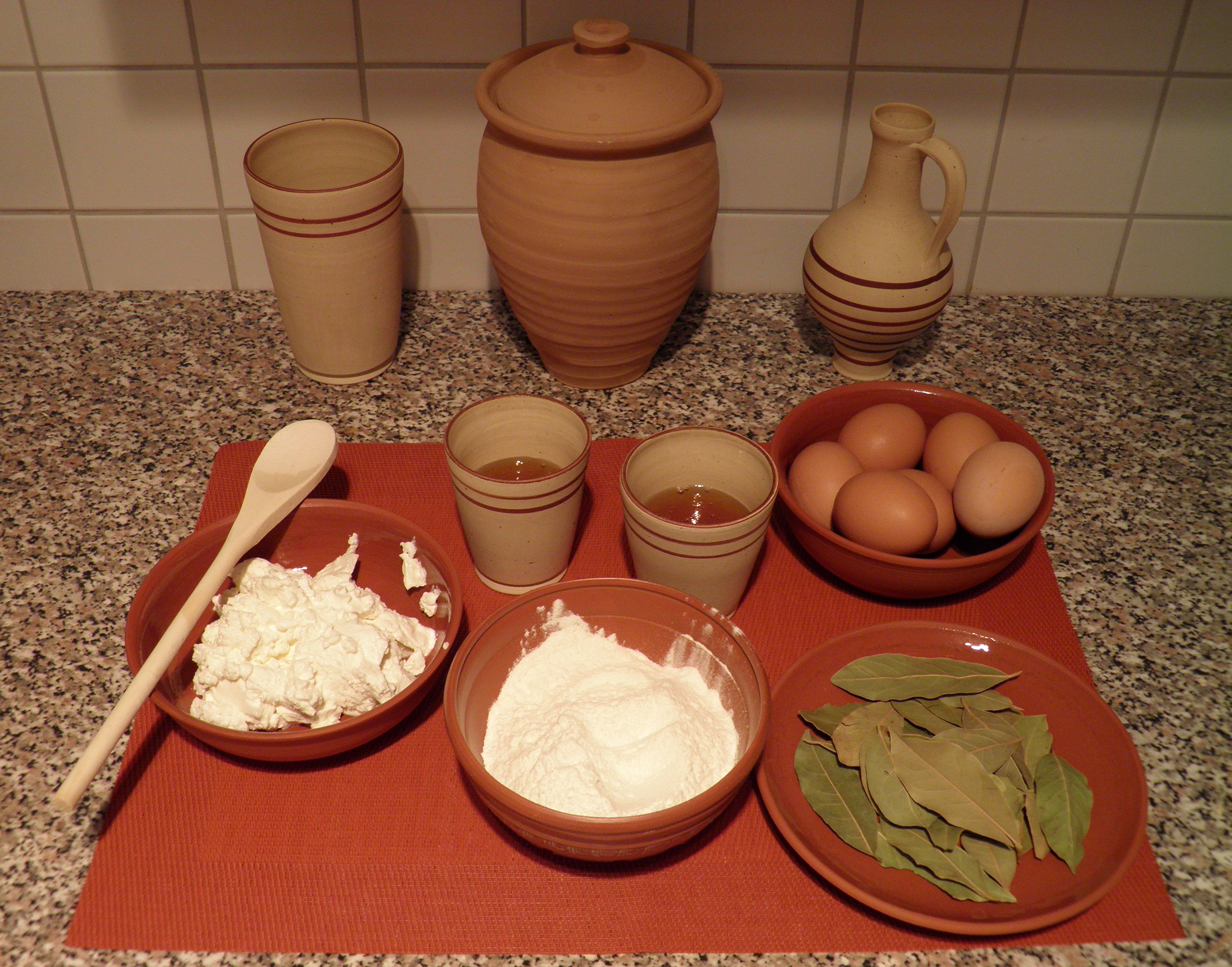
Ingredients

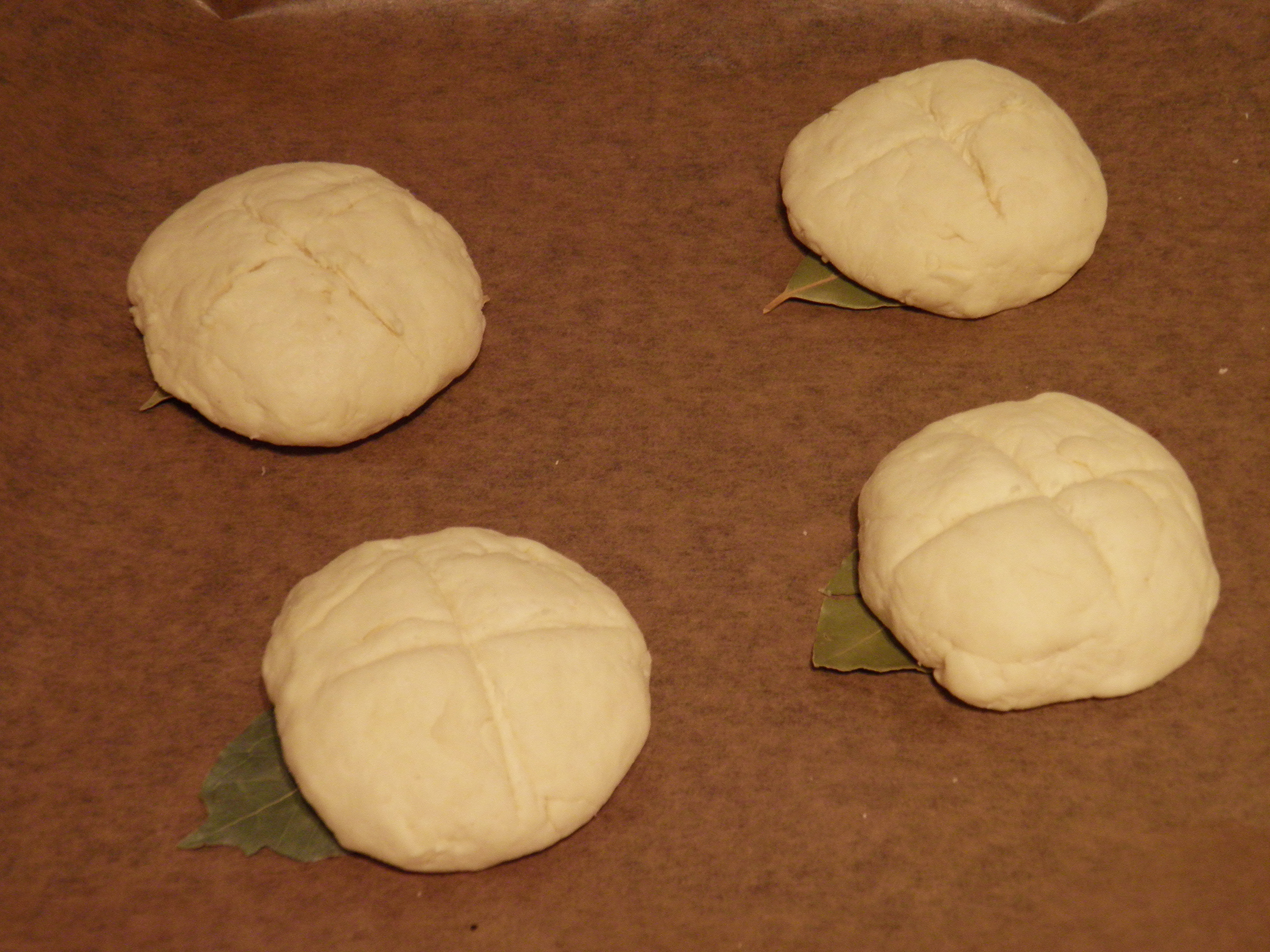
On bay leaves and ready to be baked

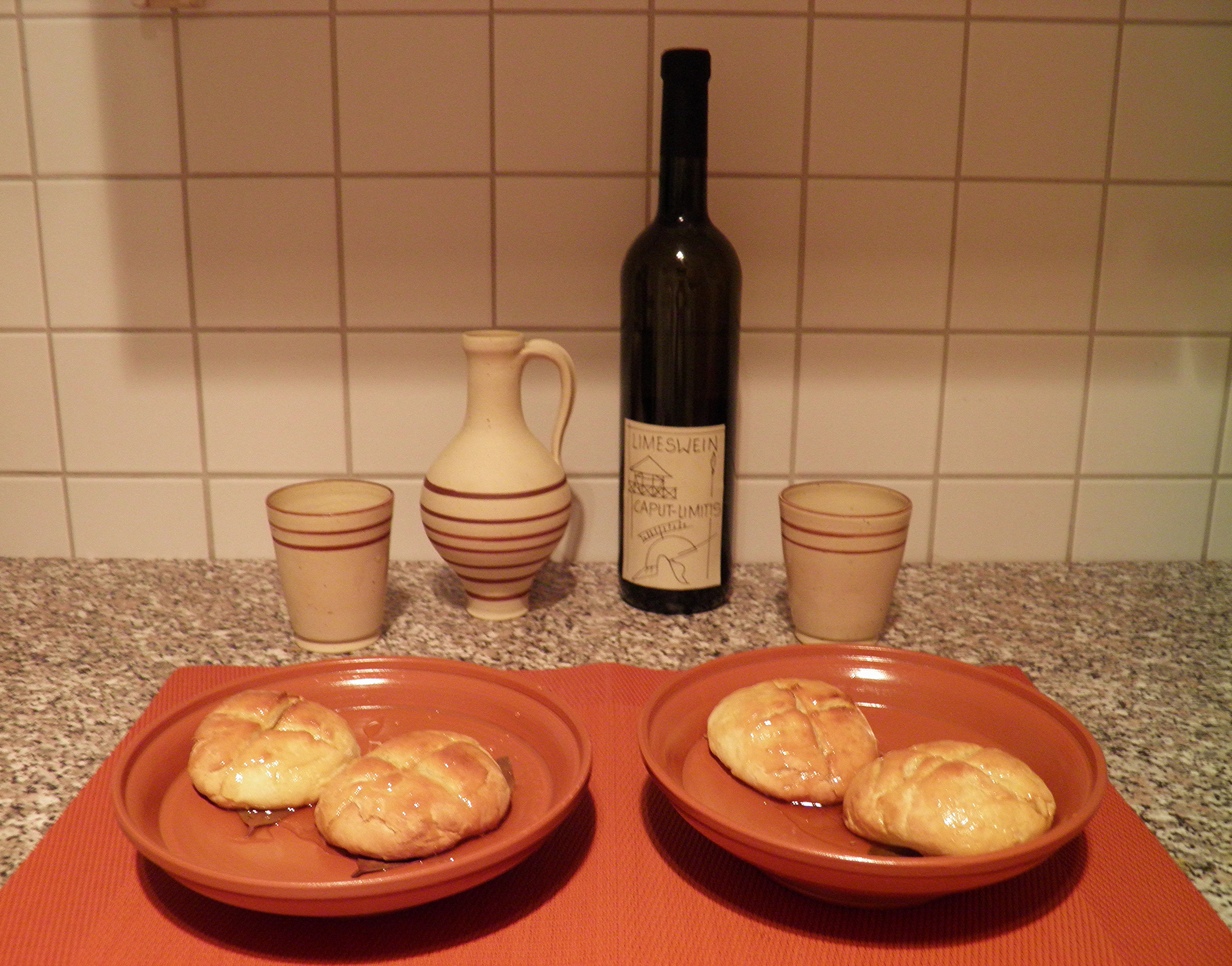
Served, drizzled with honey

== See also ==
- Ancient Roman cuisine
- Baking in ancient Rome
- Food in ancient Rome
- List of ancient dishes
- List of cakes

== Sources ==
- Baumgarthuber, Christine (2021). Fermented Foods: The History and Science of a Microbiological Wonder. London: Reaktion Books. ISBN 978-1-78914-376-8.
- Dalby, Andrew; Grainger, Sally (1996). The Classical Cookbook. Los Angeles, California: J. Paul Getty Museum. ISBN 978-0-89236-394-0.
- Dalby, Andrew (2003). Food in the Ancient World from A to Z. London & New York: Routledge. ISBN 0-415-23259-7.
- Grainger, Sally (2000). "Cato's Roman Cheesecakes: The Baking Techniques". In Walker, Harlan (ed.). Milk: Beyond the Dairy: Proceedings of the Oxford Symposium on Food and Cookery 1999. Totnes, Devon: Prospect Books. ISBN 1-903018-06-4.
- Leon, Ernestine F (January 1943). "Cato's Cakes". The Classical Journal. 38 (4).
- Lindsay, Hugh (2012). "Food Representations". In Erdkamp, Paul (ed.). A Cultural History of Food in Antiquity. A Cultural History of Food. Vol. 1. London & New York: Bloomsbury. ISBN 978-0-8578-5023-2.
- Oxford Latin Dictionary. London: Oxford University Press. 1968.
