= Plăcintă =

Stuffed deep-fried pastry prepared with a variety of fillings

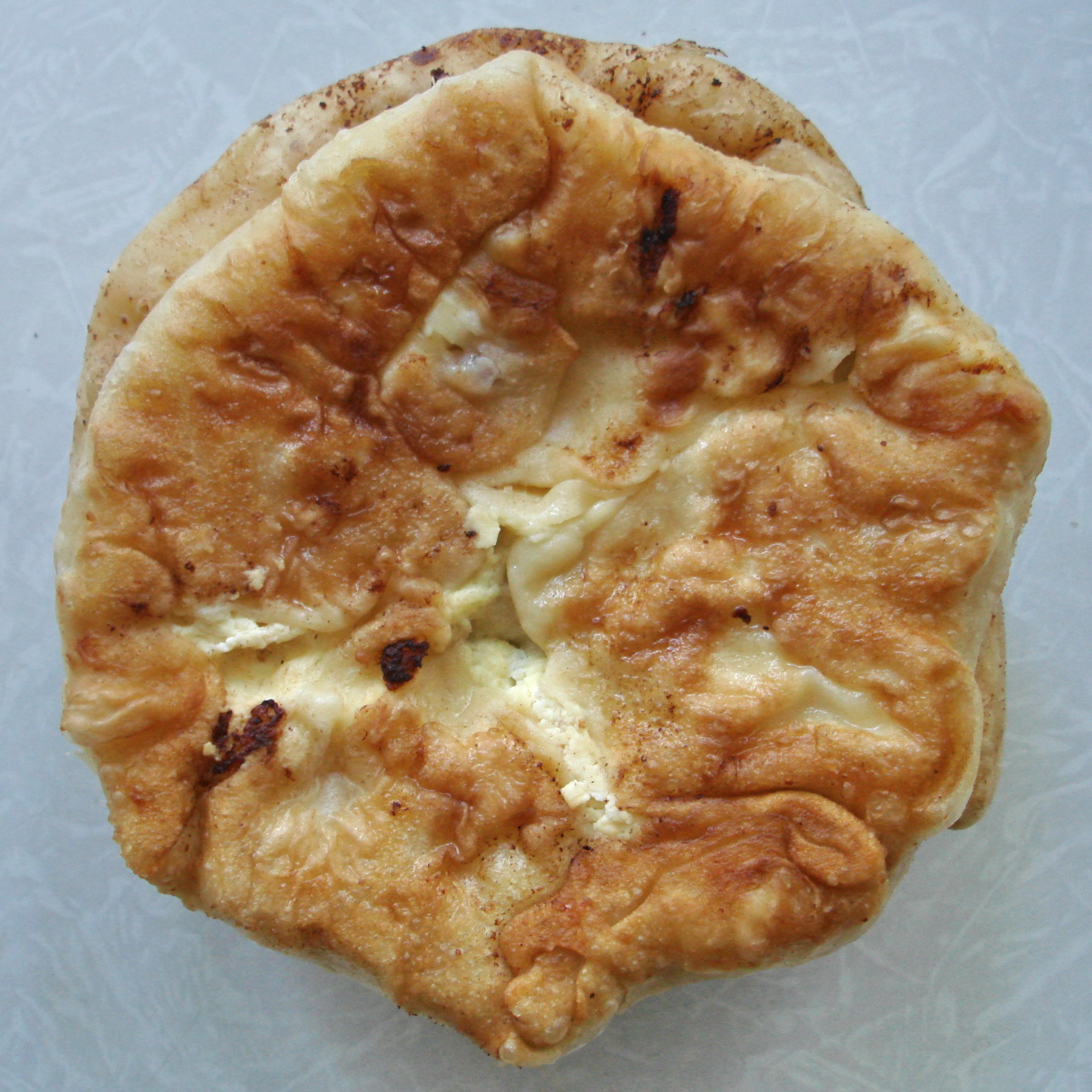
- Type: Pastry
- Course: Dessert
- Region or state: Romania; Moldova; Budjak, Ukraine
- Main ingredients: soft cheese or apples
- Variations: Placenta

Plăcintă (Romanian pronunciation: [pləˈtʃintə]) is a Romanian and Moldovan traditional pastry resembling a thin, small round or square-shaped cake, usually filled with apples or a soft cheese such as Urdă.

== Etymology ==
The word plăcintă comes from the Latin placenta, which means "cake", from the Greek πλακοῦς plakoûs, πλακουντ- plakount- "flat cake".

== History ==
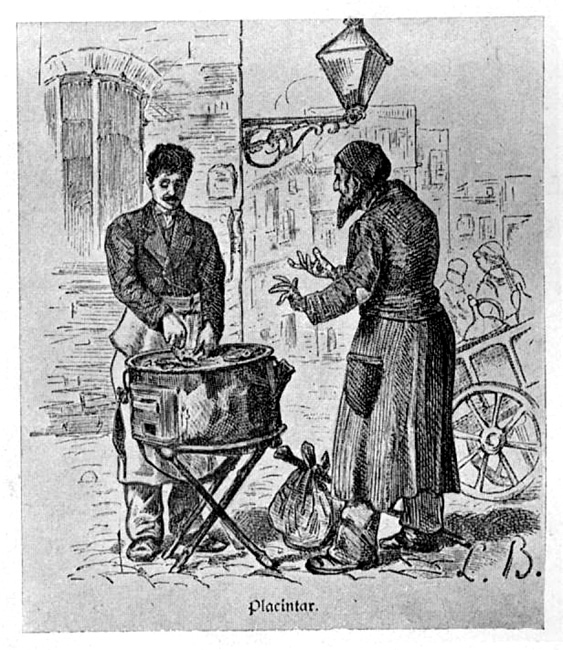
A Greek plăcintă-maker in Bucharest in 1880

As shown by the etymology of the word, the plăcintă has its origins in Ancient Rome, see Placenta cake.

Ancient Greek bakers made bread with olive oil, herbs, and cheese. The secret of making cakes was given to the Romans during the invasion. At first there were only two varieties of cakes, called the libum and the placenta. The libum was a small cake, used as an offering to the gods. As for the placenta, the Romans developed the recipe as a cake made of fine flour covered with cheese, honey, and fragrant bay leaves. Ancient Roman bakers customarily prepared a large placenta which was cut into squares to be offered for sale. This is the way that Romanians continue to prepare their plăcintă.

On July 6, 2022, the culture of platsynda cooking and eating in the villages of Frumushyka river valley was inscribed in the National Inventory of Elements of the Intangible Cultural Heritage of Ukraine.

== Traditional varieties of plăcintă ==
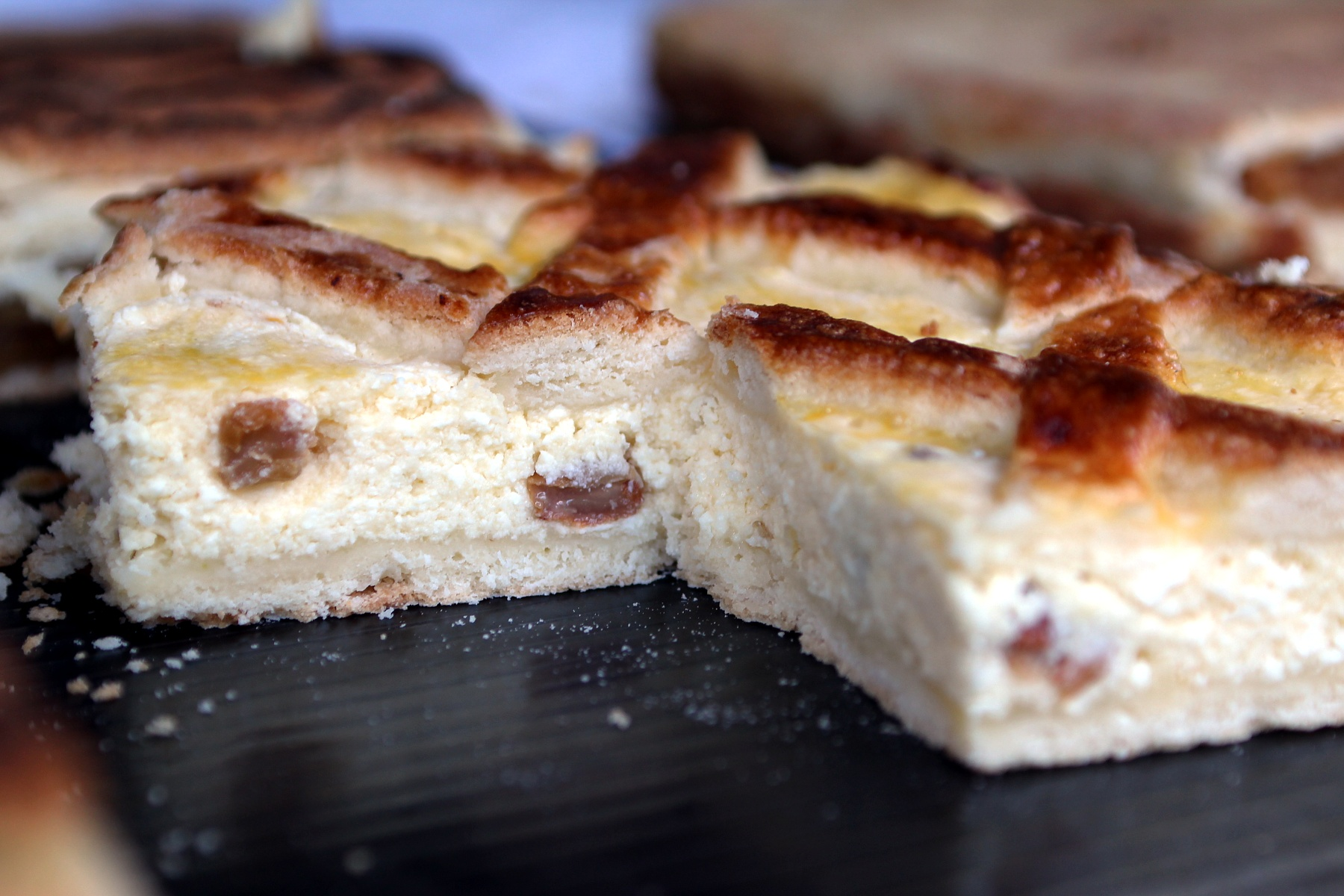
Plăcintă with cheese and raisins

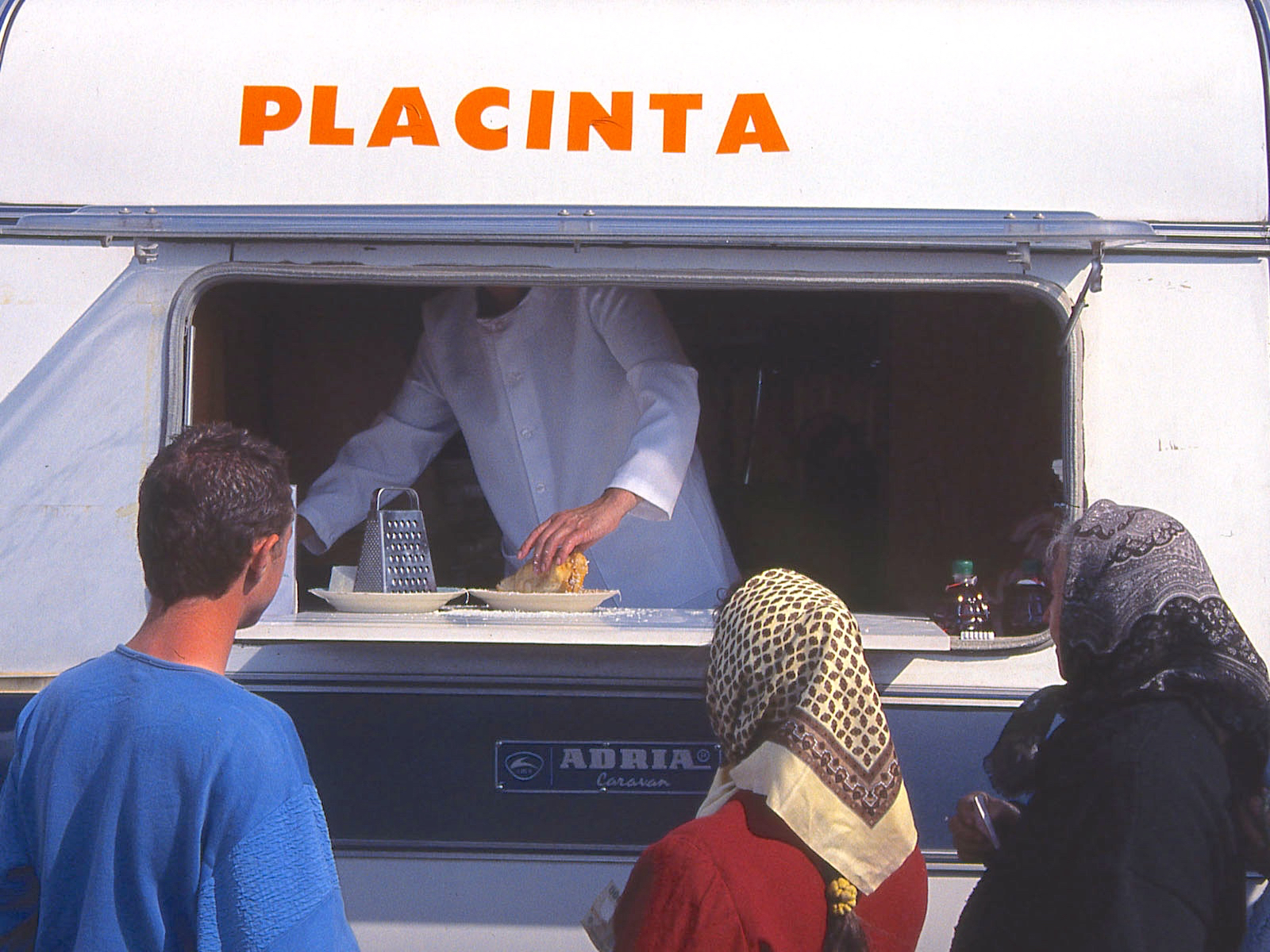
Plăcintă stall in the market in Hodod, Romania

- plăcintă cu mere is filled with apple.
- plăcintă cu brânză is filled with sheep or cow cheese, such as telemea.
- plăcintă cu cartofi is filled with potatoes.
- plăcintă cu urdă is filled with ricotta and dill, or raisins.
- plăcintă cu varză is filled with cabbage
- plăcintă cu ciocolată is filled with chocolate.
- plăcintă aromână is filled with spinach and white cheese.
- plăcintă dobrogeană is a type of plăcintă registered as a Romanian protected geographical indication (PGI) product in the European Union.
- plăcintă clătită (lit. 'swashed pie'), nowadays simply called clătită, is the Romanian crêpe-like variety of pancakes, also known in other East and Central European countries as the palatschinke.

== See also ==
- Börek
- Palatschinken
