= Rediscovering Homer =

2006 book by Andrew Dalby

Rediscovering Homer: Inside the Origins of the Epic
- Author: Andrew Dalby
- Language: English
- Published: W.W. Norton
- Publication date: 2006
- ISBN: 9780393330199

Rediscovering Homer is a 2006 book by Andrew Dalby. It sets out the problems of origin, dating and authorship of the two ancient Greek epics, Iliad and Odyssey, usually attributed to Homer.

Rediscovering Homer originated as a development and expansion of two academic papers published in the 1990s in which Dalby argued that the Iliad and Odyssey must be seen as belonging to the same world as that of the early Greek lyric poets but to a less aristocratic genre. This contradicted a widespread assumption that the epics come from an older stage of civilization and literature than the personal poetry of Archilochus, Sappho, and others.

Returning to these themes, Dalby summarizes the contents and significance of the two epics and hypothesizes the transmission they probably followed, from oral invention and circulation to written versions.

He then spotlights the unknown poet who, long after the time of the traditional Homer, at last saw the Iliad and Odyssey recorded in writing. Dalby notes that "no early author describes or names the singer who saw these two poems written down. We are given no sex and no name -- certainly not Homer, who is seen as a singer of the distant past." Based on what we can judge of this poet's interests and on the circumstances in which oral poetry has been recorded elsewhere, "it is possible, and even probable, that this poet was a woman. As a working hypothesis, this helps to explain certain features in which these epics are better -- more subtle, more complex, more universal -- than most others."

The idea is not new. Eustathius of Thessalonica recounted an ancient fiction in which both epics were composed by an Egyptian priestess, Phantasia; Samuel Butler, in The Authoress of the Odyssey, attributed the Odyssey to a Sicilian woman between 1150 and 1050 BC; and Robert Graves in his novel Homer's Daughter made a similar proposal.

Even before the appearance of Rediscovering Homer the idea was dismissed as "far-fetched" by Anthony Snodgrass on the grounds that a woman would have been "bored out of her mind" when composing the Iliad. Reviewers, even when praising the book, have continued to be sceptical of this proposal:

As Dalby notes, the Muses can "tell many lies as if true". This applies to ancient songsters and the modern scholars who study them.

— Palaima, 2007.

== Bibliography ==
- Dalby, Andrew (2006), Rediscovering Homer, New York, London: Norton, ISBN 0-393-05788-7
- Alberge, Dalya, "Scholar takes Homer on new odyssey -- into womanhood" in The Times (London), 1 July 2006.

=== Reviews ===
- Carr, Jonathan, "The elusive first poet(ess)" in Athens News 3 November 2006, p. 29.
- Leigh, Matthew, "Line endings" in Times Literary Supplement (London) 18 May 2007, p. 4.
- Palaima, Tom, "A classical example of a man getting credit for what must have been a woman's work" in Times Higher (London) 12 January 2007, pp. 22–23.
- Pulleyn, Simon, "Siren songs from the wind-dark sea" in Scotland on Sunday 24 September 2006.
- Sutherland, John, "A Trojan horse for many courses" in Financial Times: FT Magazine 7 October 2006, p. 34.
