= Hortobágyi palacsinta =

Hungarian crêpes stuffed with meat

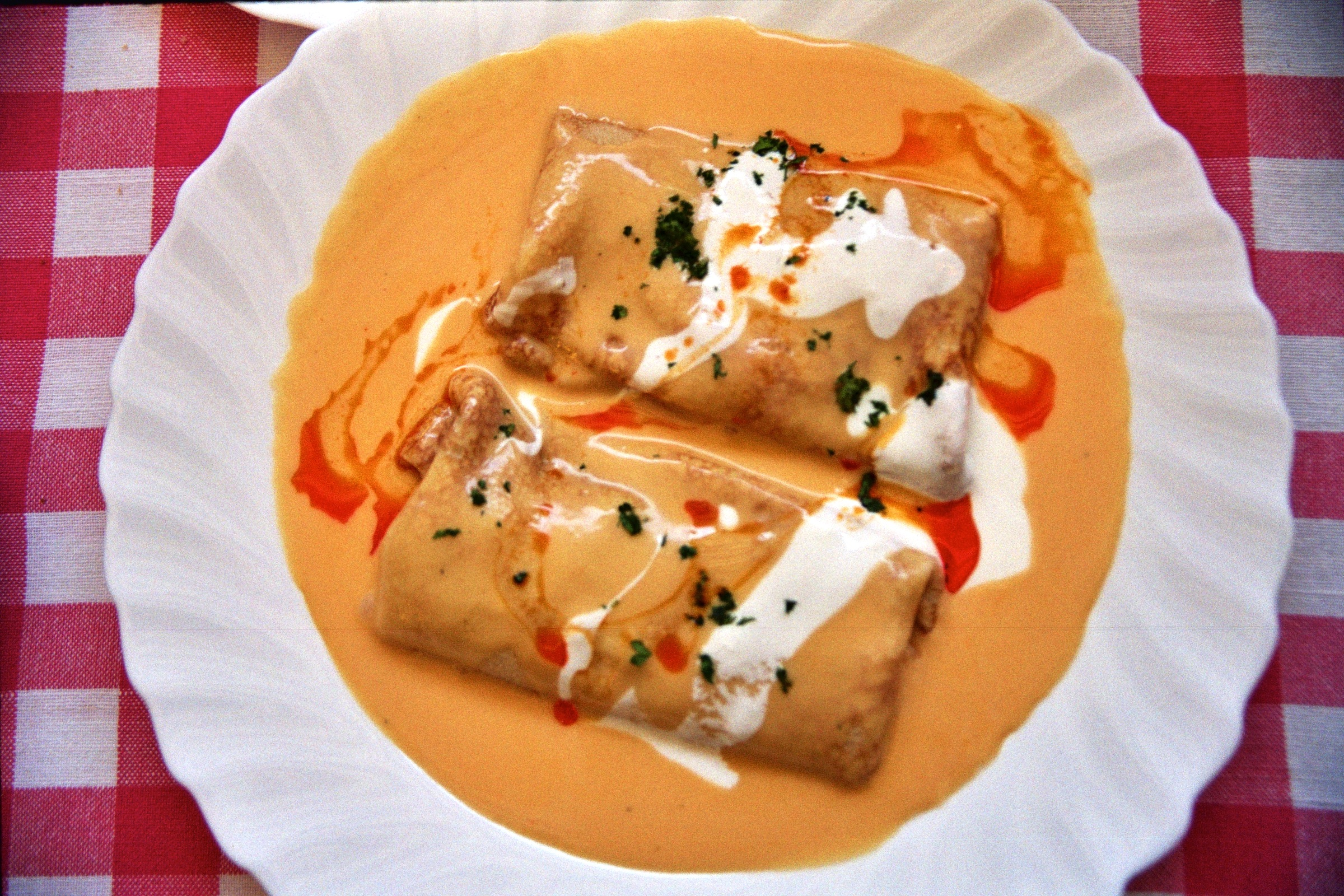
- Type: Pancake
- Place of origin: Hungary
- Region or state: Hungary, Alföld
- Main ingredients: Meat (usually veal), onions, spices, pepper and sour cream

Hortobágyi palacsinta (Hungarian: [ˈhortobaːɟi ˈpɒlɒt͡ʃintɒ]) is a savoury Hungarian crêpe dish, filled with meat (usually veal or beef). The meat is prepared as a stew with onions, and seasoned with hot paprika, garlic, salt and pepper, using veal, beef, chicken or Hungarian sausage. The sauce is drained from the stew and set aside. The crêpes are then filled with the stew, tucking in the ends. The sauce is then poured generously over the crepes, topped with tejföl (sour cream) and fresh parsley. A popular serving option in Hungary is to roll up the filled crêpes, or fold them into halves and then roll them up on the shorter side. The rolled-up crêpes then can be stacked on each other with the sauce poured over them.

The dish is unrelated to Hortobágy or the Hortobágy region of the Great Hungarian Plain. It was invented for the 1958 Brussels World Fair.

== Gallery ==
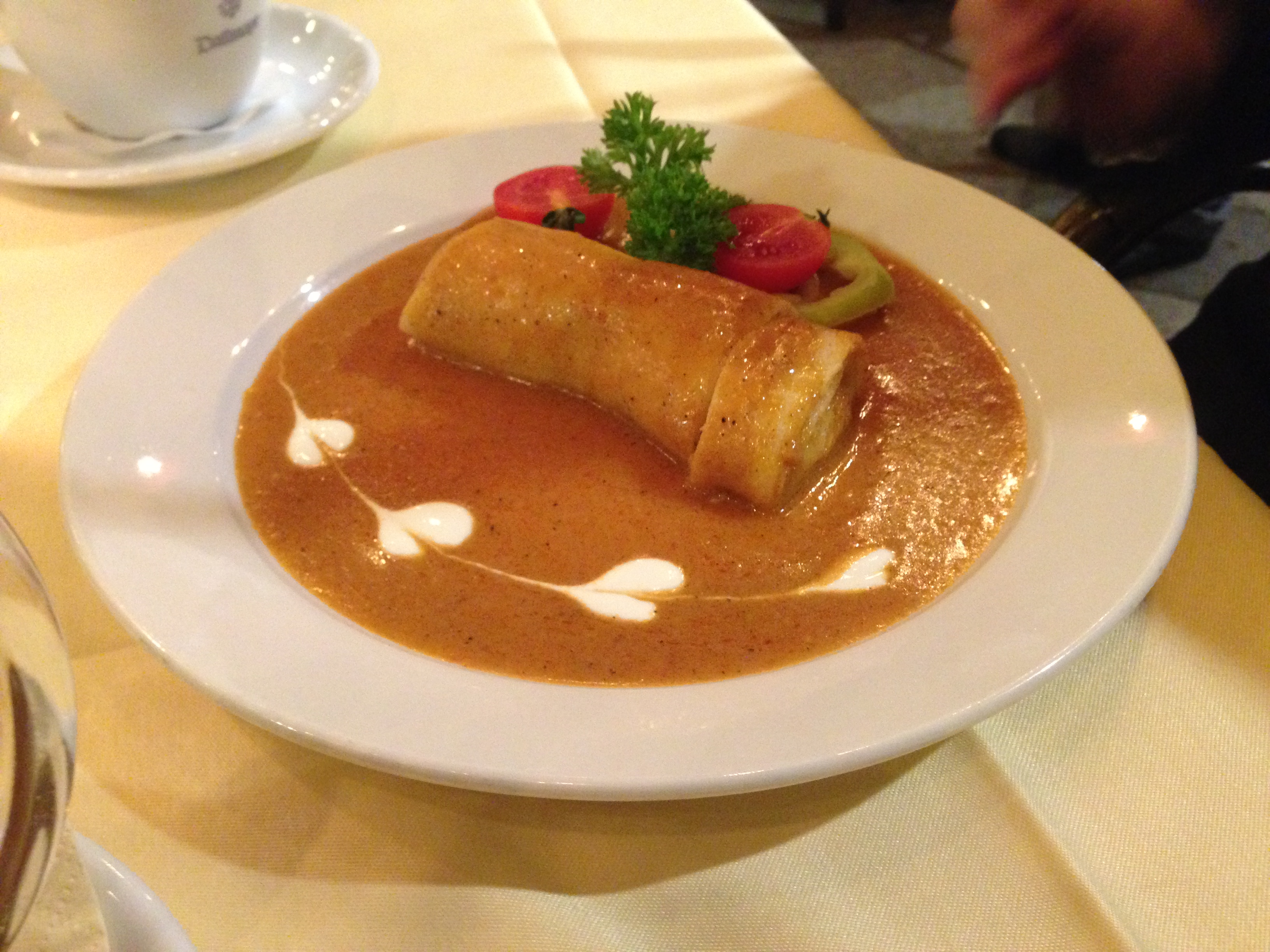

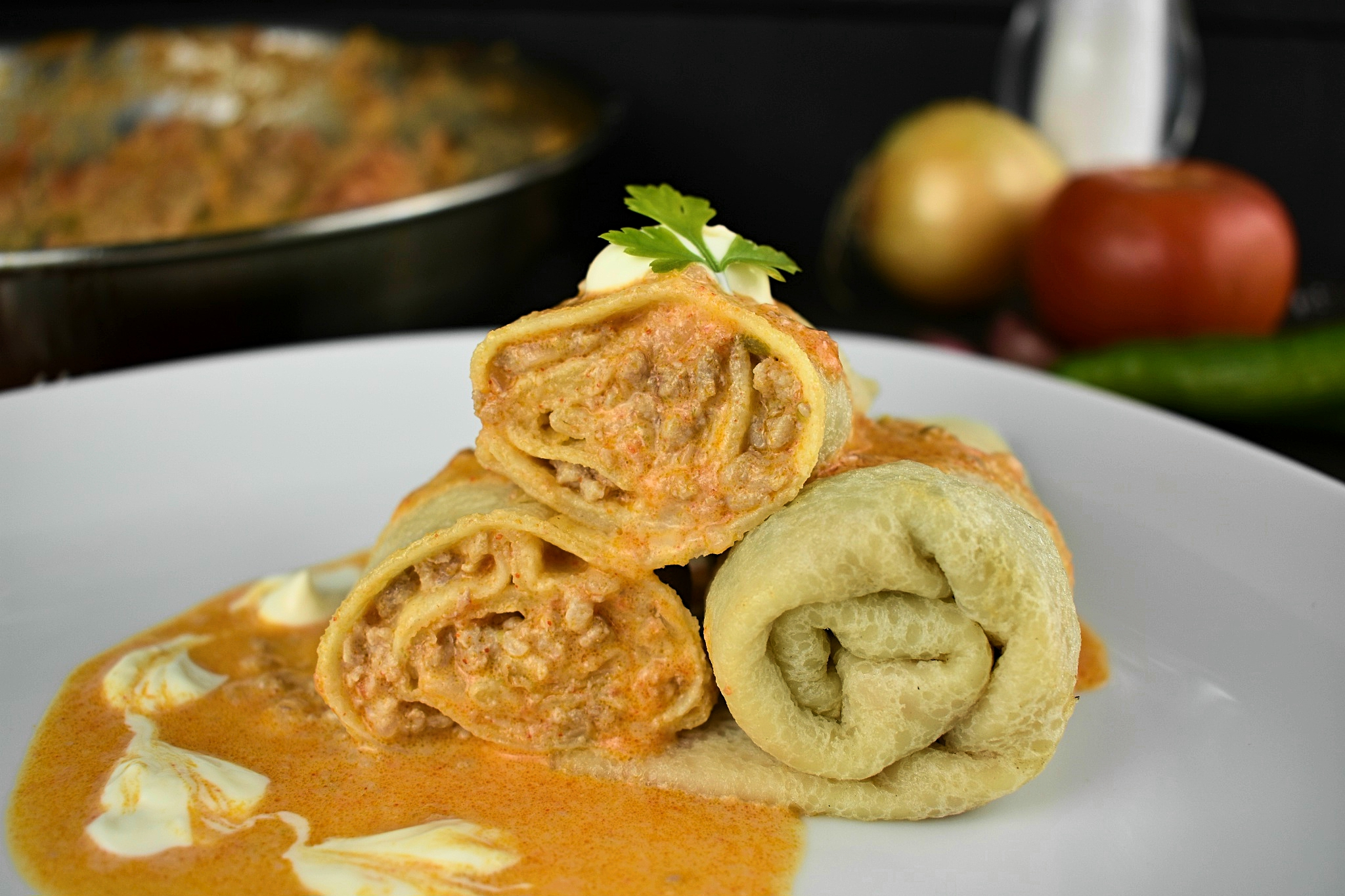

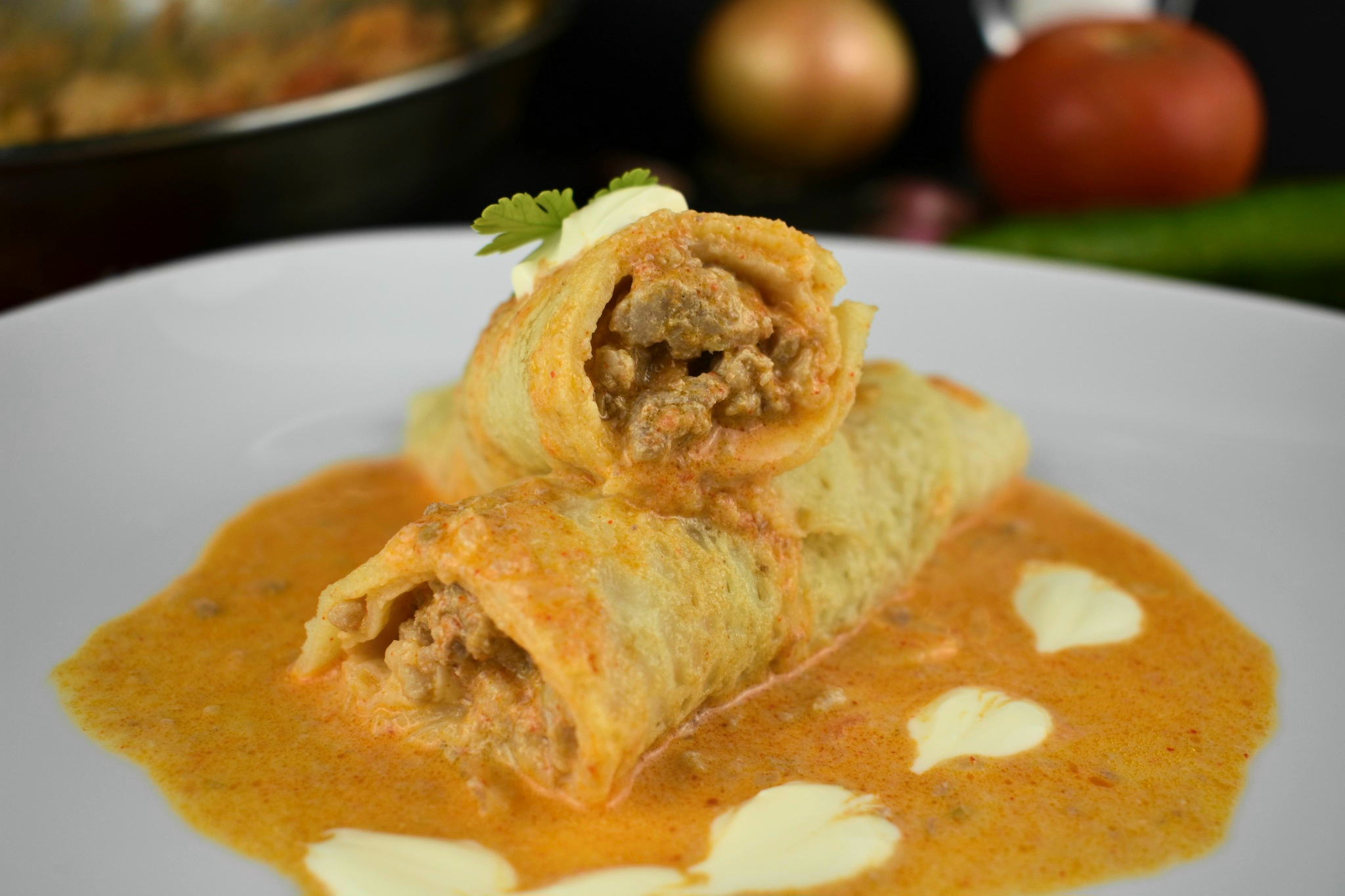

== See also ==
- List of veal dishes
