= Cheese: A Global History =

Book by Andrew Dalby

- Author: Andrew Dalby
- Language: English
- Genre: Nonfiction
- Publication date: 2009

Cheese: A Global History is a non-fiction account of cheese in history and literature by Andrew Dalby. The book explores accounts of cheese in fiction and through historical records, beginning from its unrecorded discovery but with emphasis on more recent developments. It discusses aspects of culture and language as they relate to cheese.

== Edition ==
- Andrew Dalby, Cheese: A Global History. London: Reaktion Books; Chicago: Chicago University Press, 2009. ISBN 978-1-86189-523-3 (Edible Series)
