= The World and Wikipedia =

Book by Andrew Dalby

The World and Wikipedia: How We are Editing Reality
- The World and Wikipedia (2009)
- Author: Andrew Dalby
- Language: English
- Subject: Wikipedia
- Genre: Nonfiction
- Publisher: Siduri Books
- Publication date: 25 September 2009
- Pages: 256
- ISBN: 978-0-9562052-0-9
- OCLC: 607024531

The World and Wikipedia: How We are Editing Reality is a book written by the British linguist Andrew Dalby and published by Siduri Books in 2009.

The author provides a context for the birth and growth of Wikipedia through an examination of the wider encyclopedia tradition. The work and community behaviour of its expert and non-expert contributors are discussed, as are the question of reliability and the problem of vandalism. Dalby covers numerous incidents from the English, French and German Wikipedias and closes with an optimistic outlook on the central and responsible role he believes Wikipedia will assume in the media.

The book follows an "anecdotal approach" to argue that "disproportionate emphasis on popular culture [...] does happen but that over time substance is added and entries are extended" and why "we will come to rely on it more and more and that it will come to serve us better than its predecessors." He "claims Roman naturalist, Pliny the Elder, as a proto-Wikipedian", and makes the case "that Wikipedia [...] has become more reliable as more people use it".

== See also ==
- Bibliography of Wikipedia
