= Sally Grainger =

English food historian (fl. 2025)

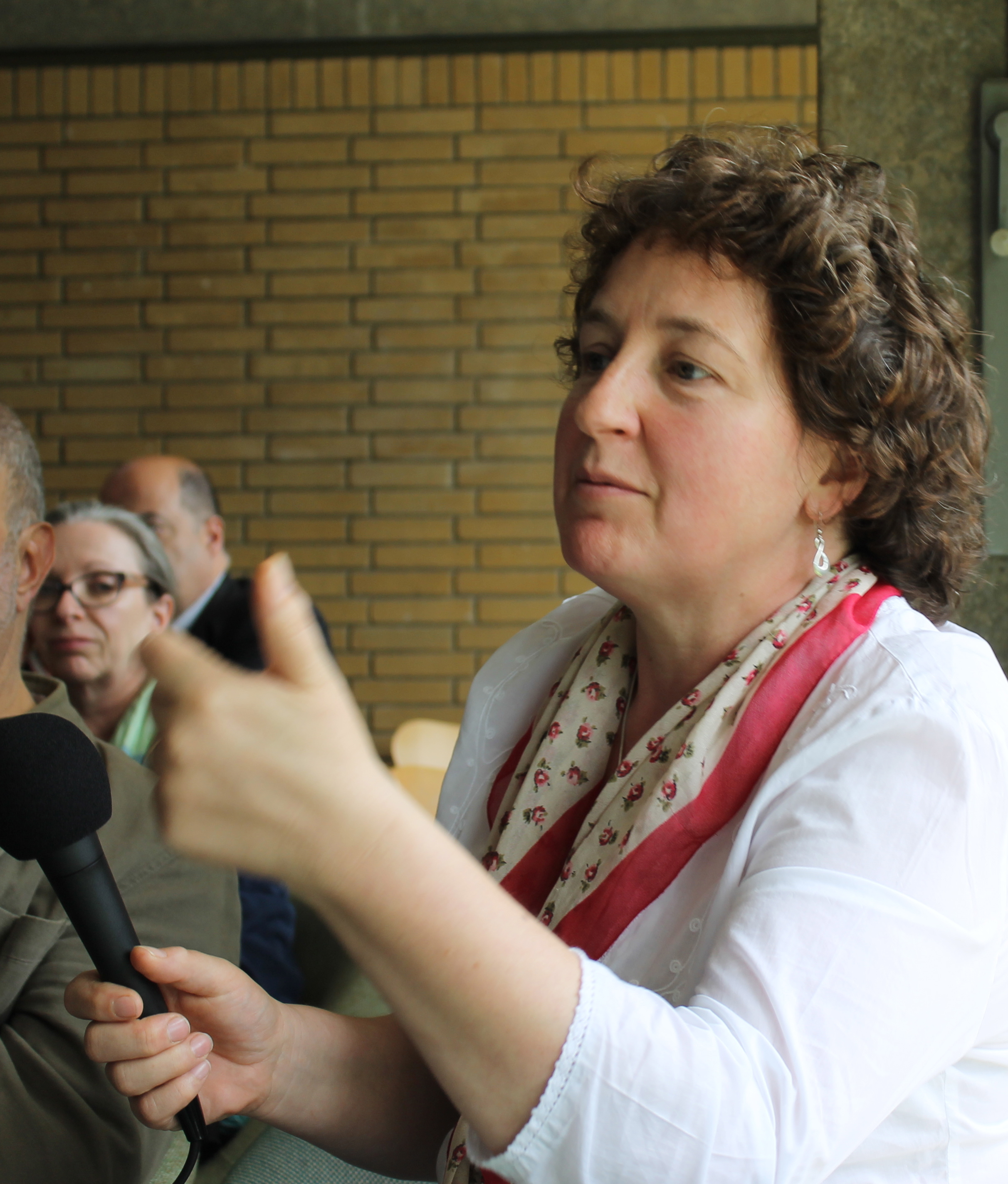
- At the Oxford Symposium on Food and Cookery in 2012
- Education: Royal Holloway University of London
- Occupation: Food historian

Sally Grainger is an English food historian specialising in Roman recipes.

== Early life and education ==
Grainger left school aged 16 with no O-levels, and worked as a pastry chef. She later gained four O-levels and two A-levels, including ancient history, at evening classes, and at the age of 30 started to study for a degree in ancient history at Royal Holloway University of London. There, at a toga party for which she had created food using Roman recipes, she met historian Andrew Dalby who suggested that they co-author a book.

== Career in food history ==
Grainger has worked with museums and television companies as an expert on Roman food, appearing on shows including Time Team and Neil Oliver's A History of Ancient Britain. She has a particular research interest in the Roman fish sauce garum, and studied for an MA at the University of Reading where her dissertation topic was "Roman fish sauce: an experiment in archaeology".

Grainger published The Classical Cookbook, coauthored with Andrew Dalby, in 1996; a revised edition was published in 2012. Together with her husband Christopher Grocock she published a translation and critical edition of Apicius' Roman cookbook in 2006.

== Selected publications ==
- Dalby, Andrew; Grainger, Sally (2012). The Classical Cookbook (2nd ed.). British Museum Press. ISBN 978-0714122755. (1st ed published 1996 by J Paul Getty Museum Pubns)
- Grocock, C. W.; Grainger, Sally (2006). Apicius: a critical edition with an introduction and an English translation of the Latin recipe text Apicius. Prospect. ISBN 978-1903018132.
- Grainger, Sally (2015). Cooking Apicius: Roman Recipes for Today. Prospect Books. ISBN 978-1903018446.
- Grainger, Sally (2021). The story of garum: fermented fish sauce and salted fish in the ancient world. London: Routledge, Taylor & Francis Group. ISBN 978-0367683122.
- Grainger, Sally (2024). Roman Recipes for Modern Cooks. Apartamento. ISBN 978-8409656806.
