= Marcus Gavius Apicius =

1st century AD Roman aristocrat and gourmet

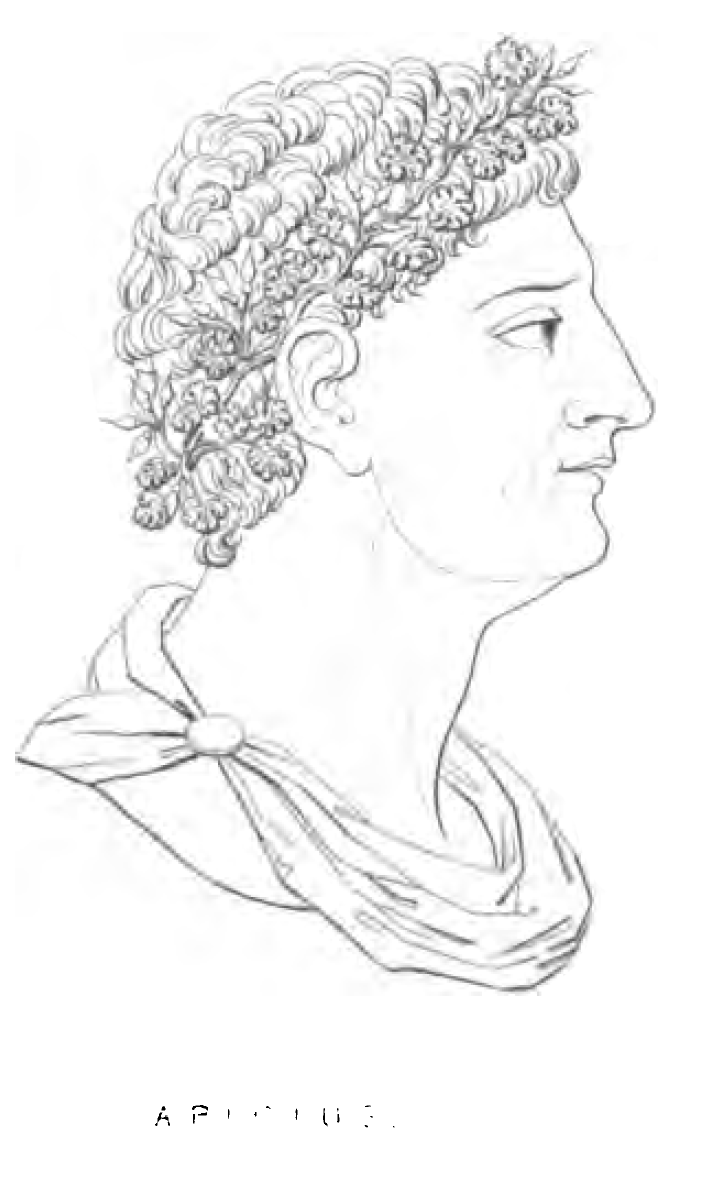
Imaginary portrait of Apicius from Alexis Soyer's Pantropheon.

Marcus Gavius Apicius is believed to have been a Roman gourmet and lover of luxury, who lived sometime in the 1st century AD, during the reign of Tiberius. The Roman cookbook Apicius is often attributed to him, though it is impossible to prove the connection. He was the subject of On the Luxury of Apicius, a famous work, now lost, by the Greek grammarian Apion. M. Gavius Apicius apparently owed his cognomen (his third name) to an earlier Apicius, who lived around 90 BC, whose family name it may have been: if this is true, Apicius had come to mean "gourmand" as a result of the fame of this earlier lover of luxury.

== Biography ==
Evidence for the life of M. Gavius Apicius derives partly from contemporary or almost-contemporary sources but is partly filtered through the above-named work by Apion, whose purpose was presumably to explain the names and origins of luxury foods, especially those anecdotally linked to Apicius. From these sources the following anecdotes about Apicius survive: to what extent they form a real biography is doubtful.

- Sejanus (20 BC – 18 October 31), afterwards well known as the minister and confidant of the emperor Tiberius, had in his youth "sold his body to Apicius": Tacitus, Annals. Sejanus’ wife Apicata may have been Apicius’ daughter.
- Apicius dined with Maecenas (70 – 8 BC), Augustus's adviser: Martial, Epigrams 10.73. It is possible that Martial drew this idea from a facile comparison made by Seneca between Maecenas, cultural adviser, and Apicius, gastronomic adviser.
- Drusus (13 BC - 14 September AD 23), son of Tiberius, was persuaded by Apicius not to eat cymae, cabbage tops or cabbage sprouts, because they were a common food: Pliny the Elder, Natural History 19.137.
- The consuls of AD 28, Junius Blaesus and Lucius Antistius Vetus, dined luxuriously at Apicius' house: Aelian, Letters nos 113-114 Domingo-Forasté (Grocock & Grainger 2006, p. 55).
- Tiberius saw a big red mullet in the market and wagered that Apicius or Publius Octavius would buy it. Both men began bidding for it and Octavius won: Seneca, Letters to Lucilius 95.42.
- Apicius lived at Minturnae (Campania). Having heard of the boasted size and sweetness of the shrimps taken near the Libyan coast, Apicius commandeered a boat and crew, but when he arrived, disappointed by the shrimps he was offered by the local fishermen who came alongside in their boats, and comparing them to the excellent crawfish he was accustomed to at his villa, he turned round and returned to Minturnae "without going ashore": Athenaeus, Deipnosophistae Ath. 1.12.
- Apicius was "born to enjoy every extravagant luxury that could be contrived". He advised that red mullet were at their best if, before cooking, they had been drowned in a bath of fish sauce made from red mullet: Pliny, Natural History 9:30.
- Apicius advised that flamingo's tongue was of superb flavour: Pliny, Natural History '10:133
- Based on existing methods of producing goose liver (foie gras), Apicius devised a similar method of producing pork liver. He fed his pigs with dried figs and slaughtered them with an overdose of mulsum (honeyed wine): Pliny, Natural History 8.209.
- Having spent a fortune of 100 million sestertii on his kitchen, spent all the gifts he had received from the Imperial court, and thus swallowed up his income in lavish hospitality, Apicius found that he had only 10 million sestertii left. Afraid of dying in relative poverty, he poisoned himself: Seneca, Consolatio ad Helviam 10.

Several recipes were named after Apicius, and probably M. Gavius Apicius is the person intended:

- A method of cooking cabbage, which is marinated in oil and salt, and uses soda to retain greenness: Pliny, Natural History 19.143.
- A kind of cake: Chrysippus of Tyana quoted by Athenaeus, Deipnosophistae 647c.
- Seven recipes in the Apicius cookbook (Dalby 2003, p. 17).

Throughout Roman literature Apicius is named in moralizing contexts as the typical gourmet or glutton. Seneca, for example, says that he "proclaimed the science of the cookshop" and corrupted the age with his example (Seneca, Consolatio ad Helviam 10). Around the 4th and 5th centuries, Apicius begins to be named as an author: this may be an indication that cookbooks titled Apicius were in circulation by that time. The first such reference may be that in the Scholia on Juvenal (4.22), which assert that Apicius wrote about how to arrange dinners, and about sauces.

== See also ==
- Ancient Roman cuisine
- Gavia gens

== Bibliography ==
- Dalby, Andrew (2003), Food in the ancient world from A to Z, London, New York: Routledge, ISBN 0-415-23259-7, pp. 16–18
- Grocock, Christopher; Grainger, Sally (2006), Apicius. A critical edition with an introduction and an English translation, Totnes: Prospect Books, ISBN 1-903018-13-7, pp. 54–58
