= Phantasia (poet) =

Ancient Egyptian woman

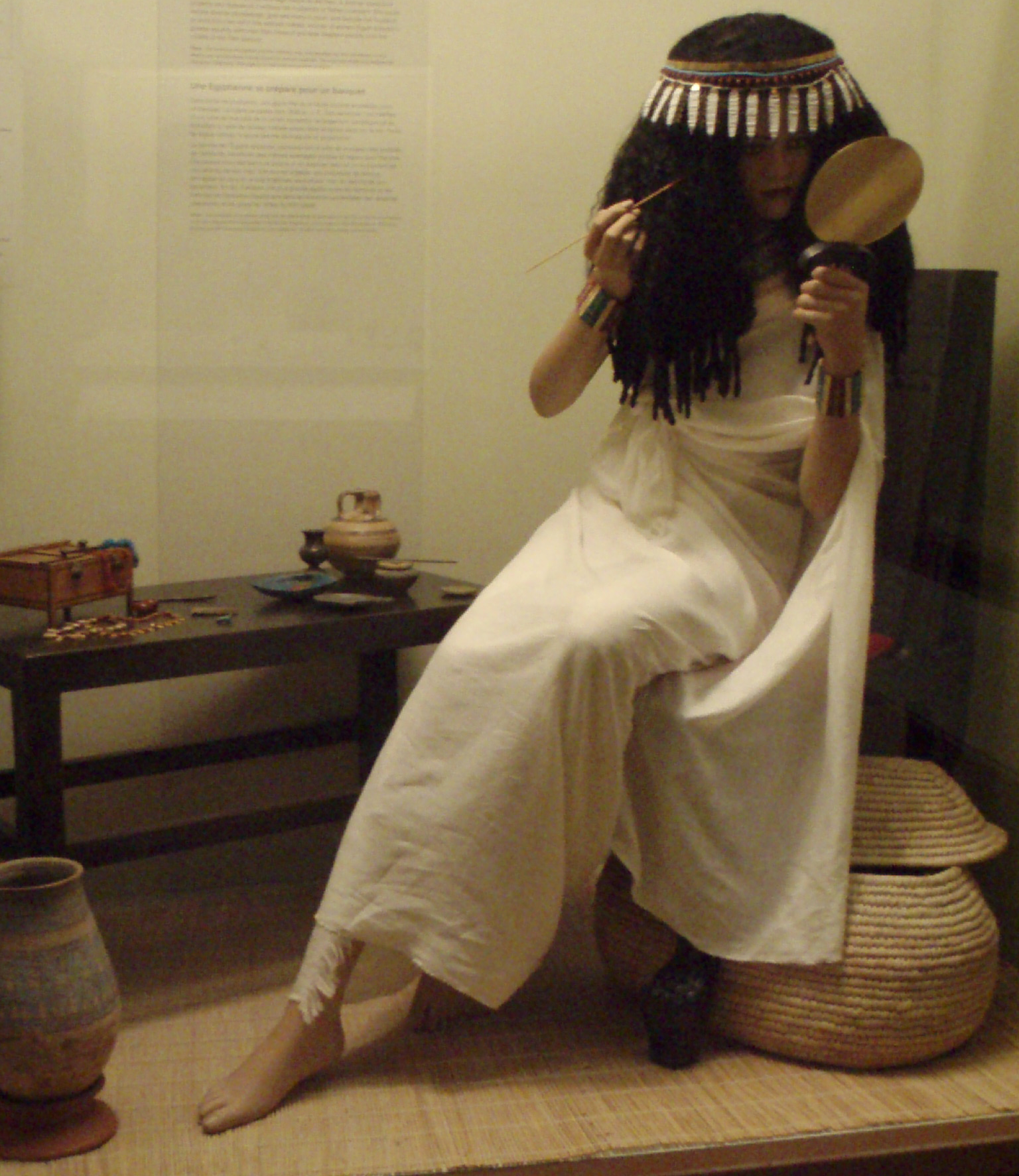

Phantasia (Ancient Greek: Φαντασία) is the name of an ancient Egyptian woman who was said to have been the author of the immediate sources of the two ancient Greek epics, Iliad and Odyssey, attributed to Homer.

According to a fiction retold by the Byzantine scholar Eustathius of Thessalonica and attributed by him to "a certain Naucrates", Phantasia, daughter of Nicarchus of Memphis, an inspired poet, wrote poems about the war in the plains of Troy and the wanderings of Odysseus, and deposited these books in the temple of Hephaestus at Memphis. Homer afterward visited the shrine, persuaded the priests to make copies of the books for him, and afterwards wrote the Iliad and Odyssey. "Some say" [Eustathius adds] "that Homer himself was Egyptian; others, that he visited the country and was taught by Egyptians."

The story is one of the least known of the biographical fictions about Homer; it is mentioned neither by Samuel Butler nor by Andrew Dalby, both of whom have developed the argument that a woman poet was responsible for the Odyssey.

Note: An earlier author, Photius of Constantinople, attributes this to Ptolemy Chennus (a Greek mythographer active 1st to 2nd century AD?).

Phantasia, a woman of Memphis, daughter of Nicarchus, composed before Homer a tale of the Trojan War and of the adventures of Odysseus. The books were deposited, it is said, at Memphis; Homer went there and obtained copies from Phanites, the temple scribe, and he composed under their inspiration.

== See also ==
- Eustathius of Thessalonica, Commentary on the Odyssey 1.2.

== Sources ==
- Photius biblioteca 190
