= Apicius (2nd century AD) =

2nd century Roman cook

According to the Deipnosophistae of Athenaeus, Apicius is the name of a cook who found a way of packing fresh oysters to send to the emperor Trajan while he was on campaign in Mesopotamia around 115 AD. The information comes by way of the Epitome or summary of the Deipnosophists, since the full text of this part of Athenaeus's work does not survive. If the information is correct, this is the third known Roman food specialist who was named Apicius, the earliest being the luxury-loving Apicius of the 1st century BC.

The late Roman cookbook Apicius gives a recipe for preserving oysters, among other foods. This is possibly the only detail in which the cookbook has a relationship with historical information about any of the people named Apicius.

== Sources ==
- Epitome of Athenaeus 1.7d
- Apicius 1.12

== Bibliography ==
- Dalby, Andrew (2003), Food in the ancient world from A to Z, London, New York: Routledge, ISBN 0-415-23259-7, p. 17
