= Restaurant Apicius =

Coordinates: 52°33′31.46″N 4°39′23.17″E

- Interactive map of Restaurant Apicius

Restaurant information
- Established: 2001
- Head chef: Thorvald de Winter
- Food type: French
- Rating: Michelin Guide
- Location: Van der Mijleweg 16, Bakkum (Castricum), 1901 KD, Netherlands
- Seating capacity: 40
- Website: http://www.restaurantapicius.com/

Restaurant Apicius is a restaurant located in Bakkum, Castricum in the Netherlands. It is a fine dining restaurant that is awarded one or two Michelin stars from 2002 up until now. GaultMillau awarded them 16.0 points (out of 20).

The restaurant is run by two brothers: head chef Thorvald de Winter and Maître Gaylord de Winter.

According to Diningcity.com Restaurant Apicius has won Penfolds Culinary Trophy.

== Star history ==
- 2002-2006: one star
- 2007-2010: two stars
- 2011-2020: one star

== See also ==
- List of Michelin starred restaurants in the Netherlands
