= De agri cultura =

Book by Marcus Porcius Cato Censorius maior

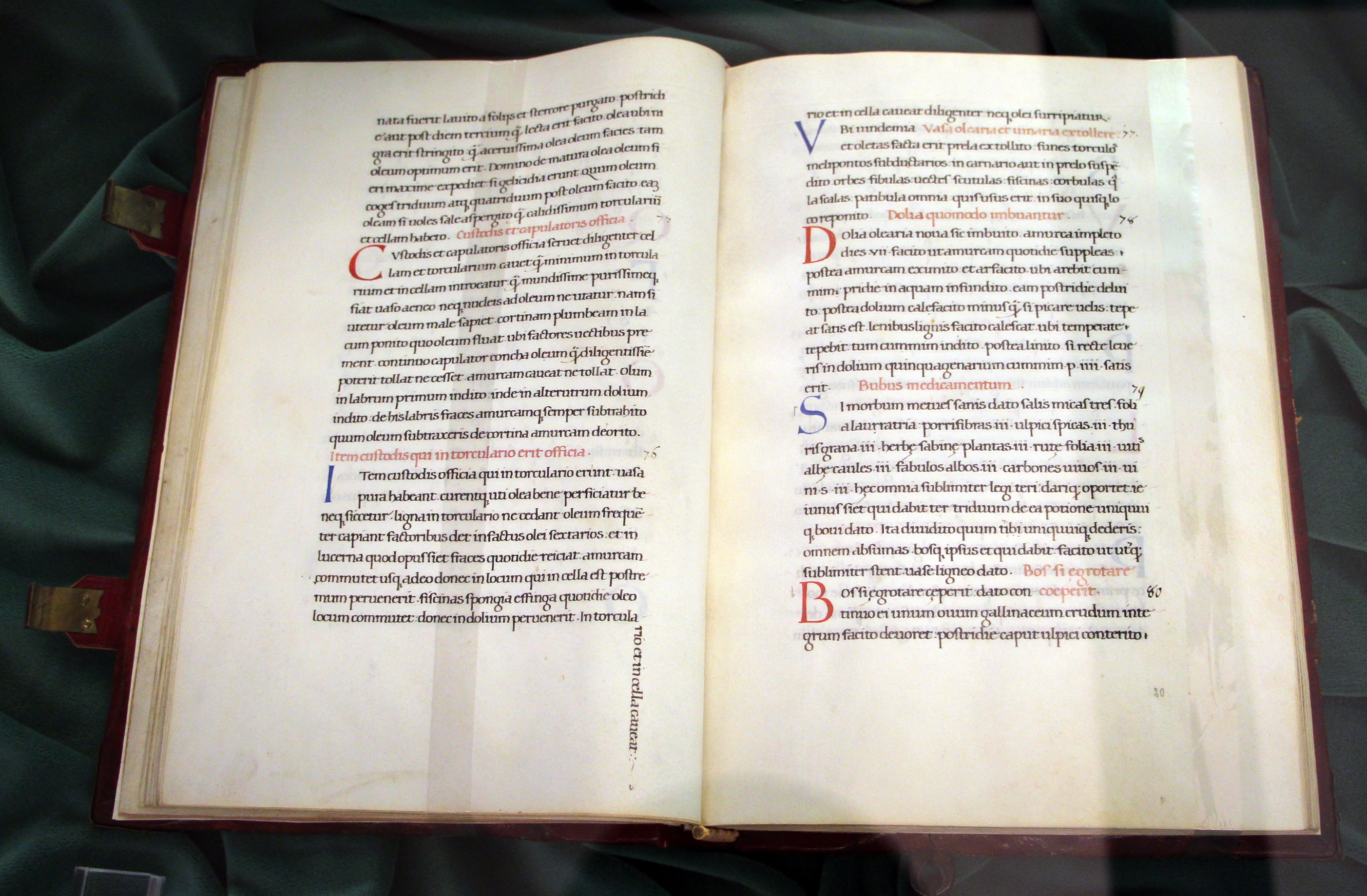
- De agri cultura (XV sec., Biblioteca Medicea Laurenziana, pluteo 51.2)
- Author: Cato the Elder
- Language: Latin
- Subject: Farming, husbandry, cooking, animal sacrifice
- Genre: Almanac, cookbook
- Publication date: c. 160s BC
- Publication place: Roman Republic

De agri cultura (Note: Literally "On the Cultivation of the Field".) ([deː ˈaɡriː kʊlˈtuːraː]), also known as On Farming or On Agriculture, is a treatise on Roman agriculture by Cato the Elder. It is the oldest surviving work of Latin prose. Cato was revered by many later authors for his practical attitudes, his natural stoicism and his tight, lucid prose. He is much quoted by Pliny the Elder, for example, in his Naturalis Historia.

== Style ==
The work of Cato is often characterized as a "farmer's notebook" written in a "random fashion"; it is hard to think of it as literature. The book seems to be no more than a manual of husbandry intended for friends and neighbours. Its direct style, however, was noted by other ancient authors like Aulus Gellius as "forceful and vigorous", in a context of extreme simplicity. Perhaps the main achievement of De agri cultura is its depiction of rural life during the Roman Republic.

== Defence of farming ==
Cato's introduction compares farming with other common activities of that time, specifically commerce and usury. He criticizes both: the former on the basis of the dangers and uncertainty which it bears; the second because according to the Twelve Tables, the usurer is judged a worse criminal than a thief. Cato makes a strong contrast with farming, which he praises as the source of good citizens and soldiers, of both wealth and high moral values.

De agri cultura contains much information on the creation and caring of vineyards, including information on the slaves who helped maintain them. After numerous landowners in Rome read Cato's prose during this time, Rome began to produce wine on a large scale. Many of the new vineyards were sixty acres, and because of their large size, even more slaves were necessary to keep the production of wine running smoothly.

== Farm recipes ==
One section consists of recipes for farm products. These include:

- An imitation of Coan wine (in which sea water was added to the must);
- The first recorded recipe for vinum Graecum, imitating the style of strongly flavoured Greek wine that used to be imported to Roman Italy.
- Savillum, libum and placenta cake, pastries similar to cheesecake
- Erneum
- Spira and spaerita
- Globi and encytum
- Punic porridge
- Wheat pap
- Starch
- Bleaching salt
- Kneading bread
- Force-feeding hens, geese, and squab
- Making a food offering to Mars for the health of cattle

Food writer Mark Kurlansky describes the placenta cake recipe as incomprehensible and resulting in an inedible dish if followed literally.

== Rituals ==
There is a short section of religious rituals such as the Suovetaurilia to be performed by farmers. The language of these is clearly traditional, somewhat more archaic than that of the remainder of the text, and has been studied by Calvert Watkins.

== Manuscripts ==
All of the manuscripts of Cato's treatise also include a copy of Varro's essay of the same name. J.G. Schneider and Heinrich Keil showed that the existing manuscripts directly or indirectly descend from a long-lost manuscript called the Marcianus, which was once in the Biblioteca Marciana in Venice and described by Petrus Victorinus as liber antiquissimus et fidelissimus (lit. 'a book most ancient and faithful'). The oldest existing manuscript is the Codex Parisinus 6842, written in Italy at some point before the end of the 12th century. The editio princeps was printed at Venice in 1472; Angelo Politian's collation of the Marcianus against his copy of this first printing is considered an important witness for the text.

== Editions ==
- Brehaut, Ernest (1933). Cato, the Censor, on Farming. New York: Columbia University Press.
- Hooper, William Davis; Ash, Harrison Boyd (1934). Cato and Varro on Agriculture. Harvard University Press: Loeb Classical Library. ISBN 9780674993136.
- Goujard, R. (1975). Caton: De l'agriculture. Paris: Collection Budé, Les Belles Lettres. ISBN 9782251010212.
- Dalby, Andrew (1998), Cato: On Farming, Totnes: Prospect Books, ISBN 0-907325-80-7

== See also ==
- Placenta cake
