= Berytius =

Berytius ('Berytian') is a Latin surname given to several writers native of Berytus (modern-day Beirut):

- Hermippus Berytius (fl. 2nd century AD), grammarian
- Lupercus Berytius, grammarian
- M. Valerius Probus Berytius (c. 20/30 – 105 AD), grammarian
- Taurus Berytius, Platonic philosopher
- Vindonius Anatolius Berytius, Greek author of the 4th century AD
