= Vinidarius =

Start of the Apici excerpta a Vinidario in the Paris manuscript

Vinidarius (fl. 5th century AD) is named as the compiler of a small collection of cooking recipes named Apici excerpta a Vinidario vir[o] inlustri ("excerpts of Apicius by the illustrious Vinidarius"), meaning that the contents are taken from an Apicius book. There is in fact very little overlap with the manual now known as Apicius, but the recipes are similar in character, and are usually published today as an appendix to Apicius: they add to our knowledge of the cuisine of late antiquity. They are preceded by a list of supplies that need to be stocked in the kitchen.

About Vinidarius himself nothing is known. If he existed, he may have been a Goth; his Latin name suggests a possible Gothic name of Vinithaharjis. Apici excerpta a Vinidario survives in a single 8th-century uncial manuscript in Latin.

== Bibliography ==
- Grocock, Christopher; Grainger, Sally (2006), Apicius. A critical edition with an introduction and an English translation, Totnes: Prospect Books, ISBN 1-903018-13-7, pp. 309–325
- Adamson, Melitta Weiss (2013), Regional Cuisines of Medieval Europe, Abingdon-on-Thames: Routledge, p. iii, ISBN 9781135308759
- Spatela, Michela; Villing, Alexandra (2015), Ceramics, Cuisine and Culture, Havertown, Pennsylvania: Oxbow Books, pp. 142, 144–146, ISBN 9781782979500
- Dalby, Andrew (2013), Food in the Ancient World from A to Z, Abingdon-on-Thames: Routledge, pp. 343–344, ISBN 9781135954222
