= Archestratus =

Mid 4th century BCE Greek poet

Archestratus of Gela
- Ἀρχέστρατος
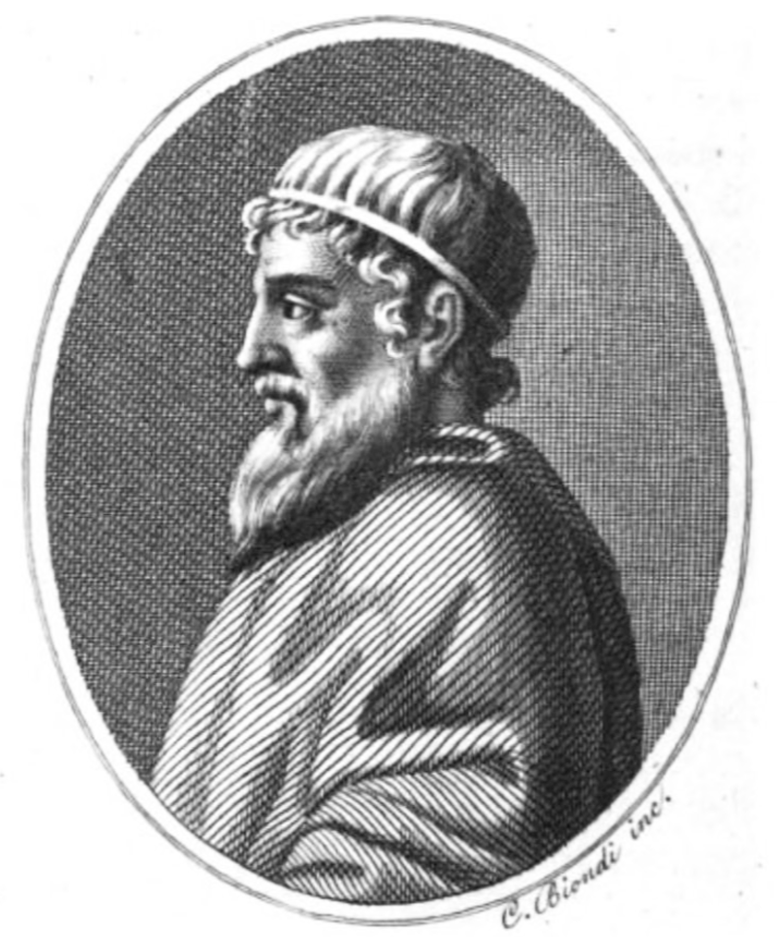
- Born: c. 4th century BCE; Gela
- Died: c. 330 BCE
- Occupation: Poet
- Notable work: Hedypatheia (Life of Luxury)

Archestratus (Ancient Greek: Ἀρχέστρατος Archestratos) was an ancient Greek poet of Gela, Magna Graecia, in Sicily, who wrote some time in the mid 4th century BCE, and was known as "the Daedalus of tasty dishes". His humorous didactic poem Hedypatheia ('Life of Luxury'), written in hexameters but known only from quotations, advises a gastronomic reader on where to find the best food in the Mediterranean world. The writer, who was styled in antiquity the Hesiod or Theognis of gluttons, parodies the pithy style of older gnomic poets; most of his attention is given to fish, although some fragments refer to appetizers, and there was also a section on wine. His poem had a certain notoriety among readers in the 4th and 3rd centuries BCE: it was referred to by the comic poet Antiphanes, by Lynceus of Samos and by the philosophers Aristotle, Chrysippus and Clearchus of Soli. In nearly every case these references are disparaging, implying that Archestratus's poem—like the sex manual by Philaenis—was likely to corrupt its readers. This attitude is exemplified in the Deipnosophistae with citations of Chrysippus:

This utterly admirable Chrysippus, in On Goodness and Pleasure book V, talks of: Books like Philaenis's, and the Gastronomy of Archestratus, and stimulants to love and sexual intercourse, and then again slave girls practised in such movements and postures and specialising in the subject; and further on he says: studying all this and getting the books about it by Philaenis and Archestratus and the other writers of such stuff; and in book VII he says: one is therefore not to study Philaenis, or the Gastronomy of Archestratus, with the expectation of improving one's life! Clearly, in quoting this Archestratus so often, you people have filled our banquet with indecency. Is there anything calculated to corrupt that this fine poet has failed to say?

Athenaeus, Deipnosophistae 335b.

Sixty-two fragments from Archestratus's poem (including two doubtful items) survive, all via quotation by Athenaeus in the Deipnosophistae. The poem was translated or imitated in Latin by Ennius, a work that has not survived. The standard edition of the fragments, with commentary and translation, is by Olson and Sens (2000).
