= Andrew Dalby =

English linguist, translator, and historian (born 1947)

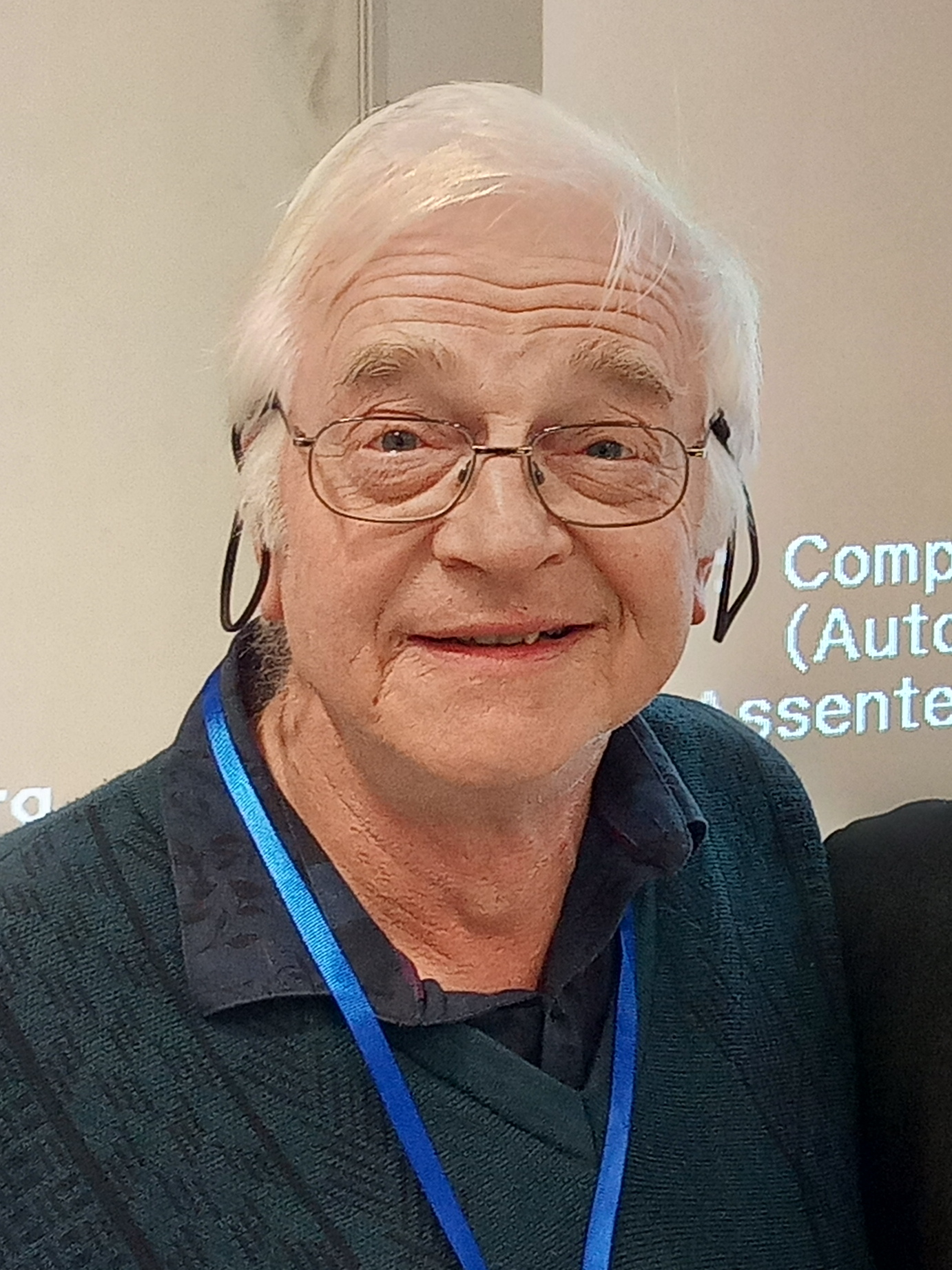
- Dalby in 2018
- Born: 1947 (age 78–79); Liverpool, England, United Kingdom
- Notable work: Rediscovering Homer; The World and Wikipedia; Cheese: A Global History

Andrew Dalby, FCIL (born 1947) is an English linguist, translator and historian who has written articles and several books on a wide range of topics including food history, language, and Classical texts.

== Education and early career ==
Dalby studied Latin, French, and Greek at the Bristol Grammar School and University of Cambridge. Here he also studied Romance languages and linguistics, earning a bachelor's degree in 1970.

Dalby worked for 15 years at Cambridge University Library, eventually specialising in Southern Asia. He gained familiarity with some other languages because of his work there, where he had to work with foreign serials and afterwards with South Asia and Southeast Asian materials. He also wrote articles on multilingual topics linked with the library and its collections.

In 1982 and 1983, he collaborated with Sao Saimong in cataloguing the Scott Collection of manuscripts and documents from Burma (especially the Shan States) and Indochina. Dalby later published a short biography of the colonial civil servant and explorer James Scott, who formed the collection. To help him with this task, he took classes in Cambridge again in Sanskrit, Hindi, and Pali and in London in Burmese and Thai.

== Regent's College and food writing ==
After his time at Cambridge, Dalby worked in London helping to start the library at Regent's College and on renovating another library at London House (Goodenough College). He also served as Honorary Librarian of the Institute of Linguists, for whose journal The Linguist he writes a regular column. He later did a part-time PhD at Birkbeck College, London in ancient history (in 1987–1993), which improved his Latin and Greek. His Dictionary of Languages was published in 1998. Language in Danger, on the extinction of languages and the threatened monolingual future, followed in 2002.

Meanwhile, he began to work on food history and contributed to Alan Davidson's journal Petits Propos Culinaires; He was eventually one of Davidson's informal helpers on the Oxford Companion to Food. Dalby's first food history book, Siren Feasts, appeared in 1995 and won a Runciman Award; it is also well known in Greece, where it was translated as Seireneia Deipna. At the same time he was working with Sally Grainger on The Classical Cookbook, the first historical cookbook to look beyond Apicius to other ancient Greek and Roman sources in which recipes are found.

Dangerous Tastes, on the history of spices, was the Guild of Food Writers Food Book of the Year for 2001. Work on this also led to Dalby's first article for Gastronomica magazine, in which he traced the disastrous exploration of Gonzalo Pizarro in search of La Canela in eastern Ecuador, showing how the myth of the "Valley of Cinnamon" first arose and identifying the real tree species which was at the root of the legend. Dalby's light-hearted biography of Bacchus includes a retelling, rare in English, of the story of Prosymnus and the price he demanded for guiding Dionysus to Hades. In an unfavorable review of Bacchus in The Guardian, Ranjit Bolt argues that Dalby's "formidable learning" overwhelmed his ability to offer the reader an appealing narrative. His epilogue to Petronius' Satyrica combines a gastronomic commentary on the "Feast of Trimalchio" with a fictional dénouement inspired by the fate of Petronius himself.

== Classics ==
Dalby's Rediscovering Homer developed out of two academic papers from the 1990s in which he argued that the Iliad and Odyssey must be seen as belonging to the same world as that of the early Greek lyric poets but to a less aristocratic genre. Returning to these themes, he spotlit the unknown poet who, long after the time of the traditional Homer, at last saw the Iliad and Odyssey recorded in writing. As he teasingly suggested, based on what we can judge of this poet's interests and on the circumstances in which oral poetry has been recorded elsewhere, "it is possible, and even probable, that this poet was a woman."

== Languages ==
Dalby's book Language in Danger: The Loss of Linguistic Diversity and the Threat to Our Future, focuses on the decline and extinction of languages from ancient times to the modern era. Dalby attributes the loss to the emergence of large centralised political groupings, the spread of communications technologies, and the hegemony of the English language. According to Mario Basini, Dalby argues that the loss of a language is a loss to all of humanity, because each language embodies a unique view of the world and contains unique information about the manner in which its speakers interact with a unique place, knowledge and perspectives that are lost when a language goes extinct.

Dalby profiles endangered languages and discusses the significance of their disappearance, which he estimates occurs at a rate of one every two weeks. He states that the world is diminished by each language lost because they encapsulate "local knowledge and ways of looking at the human condition that die with the last speaker." He also discusses the way stronger languages "squeeze out" others, using the rise of Latin and the extinctions that occurred around the Mediterranean in classical times as an example, and notes a similar pattern that Irish, Welsh, and various Native American languages and indigenous Australian languages have faced in the English-speaking world, where they "were banned in school to force minority groups to speak the language of the majority". Dalby writes that preferences have shifted toward encouraging minority languages and that many can be saved. His account was described as engrossing by The Wall Street Journal. The book disputes advocacy of a single common language as a means to a happier, more peaceful, and improved world.

== Works ==
- 1993: South East Asia: a guide to reference material
- 1995: Siren Feasts: a history of food and gastronomy in Greece
- 1996: The Classical Cookbook
- 1998: Cato: On Farming (translation and commentary)
- 1998: Dictionary of Languages
- 1998: Guide to World Language Dictionaries
- 2000: Empire of Pleasures: Luxury and Indulgence in the Roman World
- 2000: Dangerous Tastes: the story of spices
- 2002: Language in Danger; The Loss of Linguistic Diversity and the Threat to Our Future Columbia University 329 pages
- 2003: Flavours of Byzantium
- 2003: Food in the Ancient World from A to Z
- 2005: Bacchus: a biography
- 2005: Venus: a biography
- 2006: Rediscovering Homer
- 2009: The World and Wikipedia
- 2009: Cheese: a global history
- 2010: Tastes of Byzantium: The Cuisine of a Legendary Empire
