= Ancient Greek cuisine =

Ancient Greek cuisine was characterized by its frugality for most, reflecting agricultural hardship, but a great diversity of ingredients was known, and wealthy Greeks were known to celebrate with elaborate meals and feasts.

The cuisine was founded on the "Mediterranean triad" of cereals, olives, and grapes, which had many uses and great commercial value, but other ingredients were as important, if not more so, to the average diet: most notably legumes. Research suggests that the agricultural system of ancient Greece could not have succeeded without the cultivation of legumes.

Modern knowledge of ancient Greek cuisine and eating habits is derived from textual, archeological, and artistic evidence.

== Meals ==
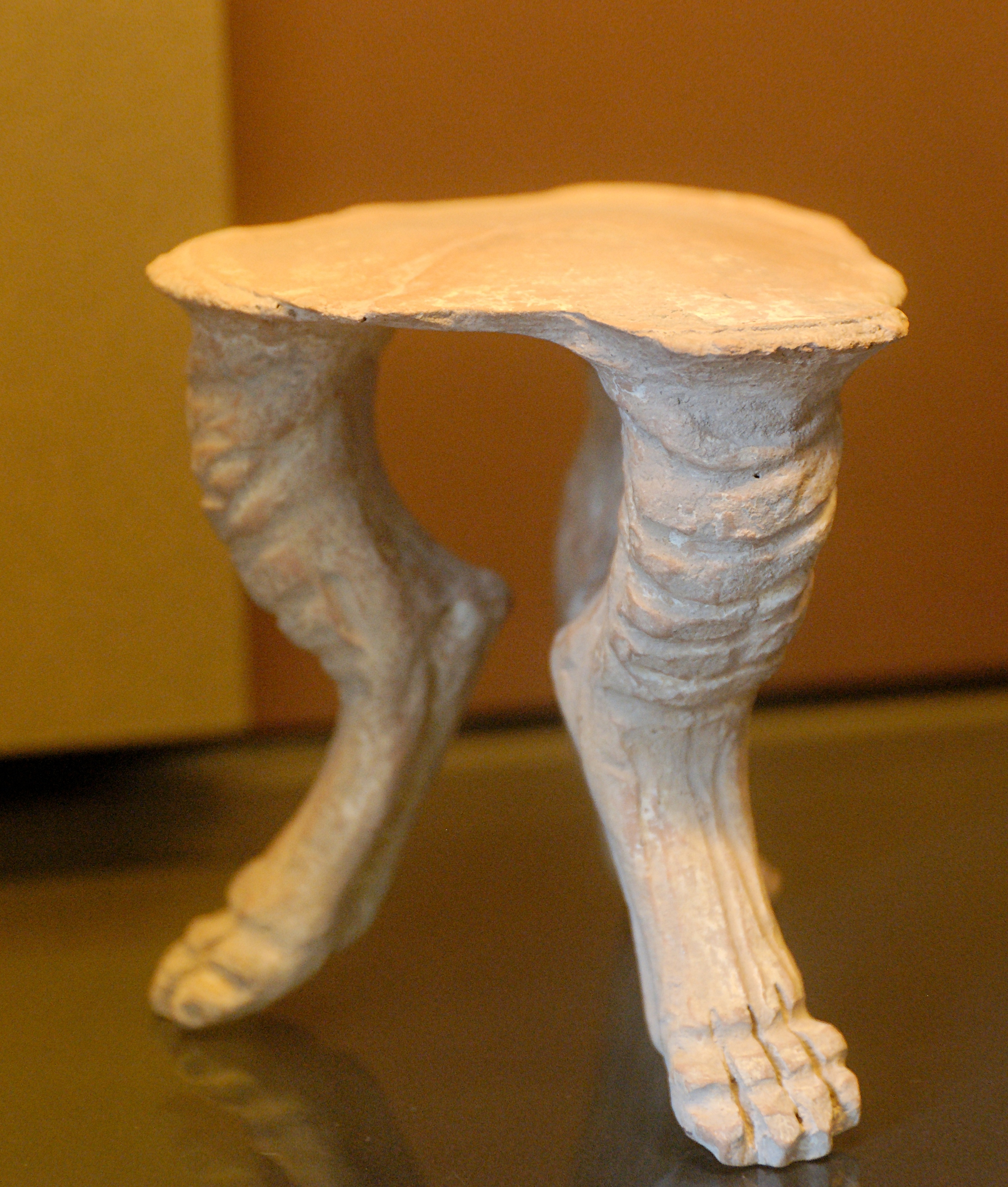
Terracotta model representing a lion's paw tripod table, 2nd–1st century BCE, from Myrina, Louvre

In the Homeric epics of the Iliad and Odyssey, three meals are mentioned.

1. Ariston (ἄριστον)
2. Dorpon (δόρπον) or Dorpos (δόρπος)
3. Deipnon (δεῖπνον)

Ariston was the early meal, while dorpon was the late meal. Deipnon could be either, without reference to time.

In the later age, Greeks had the meals of:

1. Acratisma (ἀκράτισμα)
2. Ariston
3. Deipnon

Acratisma was the early meal (similar to the ariston of the Homeric age), ariston was the middle meal and deipnon was the evening meal (similar to the dorpon of the Homeric age).

Prochoos (πρόχοος) or prochous (πρόχους) was a jug or ewer used for washing the hands before and after meals.

=== Description of the meals ===
==== Breakfast ====
Breakfast (ἀκρατισμός akratismós and ἀκράτισμα akratisma, acratisma) consisted of barley bread dipped in wine (ἄκρατος ákratos), sometimes complemented by figs, dates or olives. They also ate a sort of pancake called τηγανίτης (tēganítēs) or ταγηνίας (tagēnías), all words deriving from τάγηνον (tágēnon), "frying pan". The earliest attested references on tagenias are in the works of the 5th century BCE poets Cratinus and Magnes.

Teganites were made with wheat flour, olive oil, honey and curdled milk, and were served for breakfast. Another kind of pancake was σταιτίτης (staititēs), from σταίτινος (staitinos), "of flour or dough of spelt", derived from σταῖς (stais), "flour of spelt". Athenaeus in his Deipnosophistae mentions staititas topped with honey, sesame and cheese.

==== Lunch ====
A quick lunch (ἄριστον áriston) was taken around noon or early afternoon.

==== Dinner ====
Dinner (δεῖπνον deīpnon), the most important meal of the day, was generally taken at nightfall. An additional light meal (ἑσπέρισμα hespérisma) was sometimes taken in the late afternoon. Ἀριστόδειπνον / aristódeipnon, literally "lunch-dinner", was served in the late afternoon instead of dinner.

Epideipnis (ἐπιδειπνίς) was a second course at dinner.

==== Eating customs ====
Men and women took their meals separately. When the house was small, the men ate first and the women afterwards. Respect for the father who was the breadwinner was obvious. Slaves waited at dinners. Aristotle notes that "the poor, having no slaves, would ask their wives or children to serve food."

The ancient Greek custom of placing terracotta miniatures of furniture in children's graves gives a good idea of its style and design. The Greeks normally ate while seated on chairs; benches were used for banquets. Tables - high for normal meals, low for banquets - were initially rectangular. By the 4th century BCE, most tables were round, often with animal-shaped legs (for example lion's paws).

Loaves of flat bread were occasionally used as plates; terracotta bowls were more common. Loaves were usually flat, circular and indented into four or more parts, but there are instances which were also made in other forms, such as cubes. Dishes became more refined over time, and by the Roman period plates were sometimes made out of precious metals or glass. Cutlery was not often used at the table. Use of the fork was unknown; people ate with their fingers. Knives were used to cut the meat. Spoons were used for soups and broths. Pieces of bread (ἀπομαγδαλιαί apomagdaliai) could be used to spoon the food or as napkins to wipe the fingers. In Greek dining customs, guests washed their hands before and after meals. Slaves assisted by carrying a basin (λέβης, χέρνιψ, χειρόνιπτρον) to catch the water poured from a jug (πρόχους). Another slave provided a linen napkin (χειρόμακτρον, ἐκμαγεῖον) for drying the hands.

=== Social dining ===
As with modern dinner parties, the host could simply invite friends or family; but two other forms of social dining were well documented in ancient Greece: the entertainment of the all-male symposium, and the obligatory, regimental syssitia.

==== Symposium ====
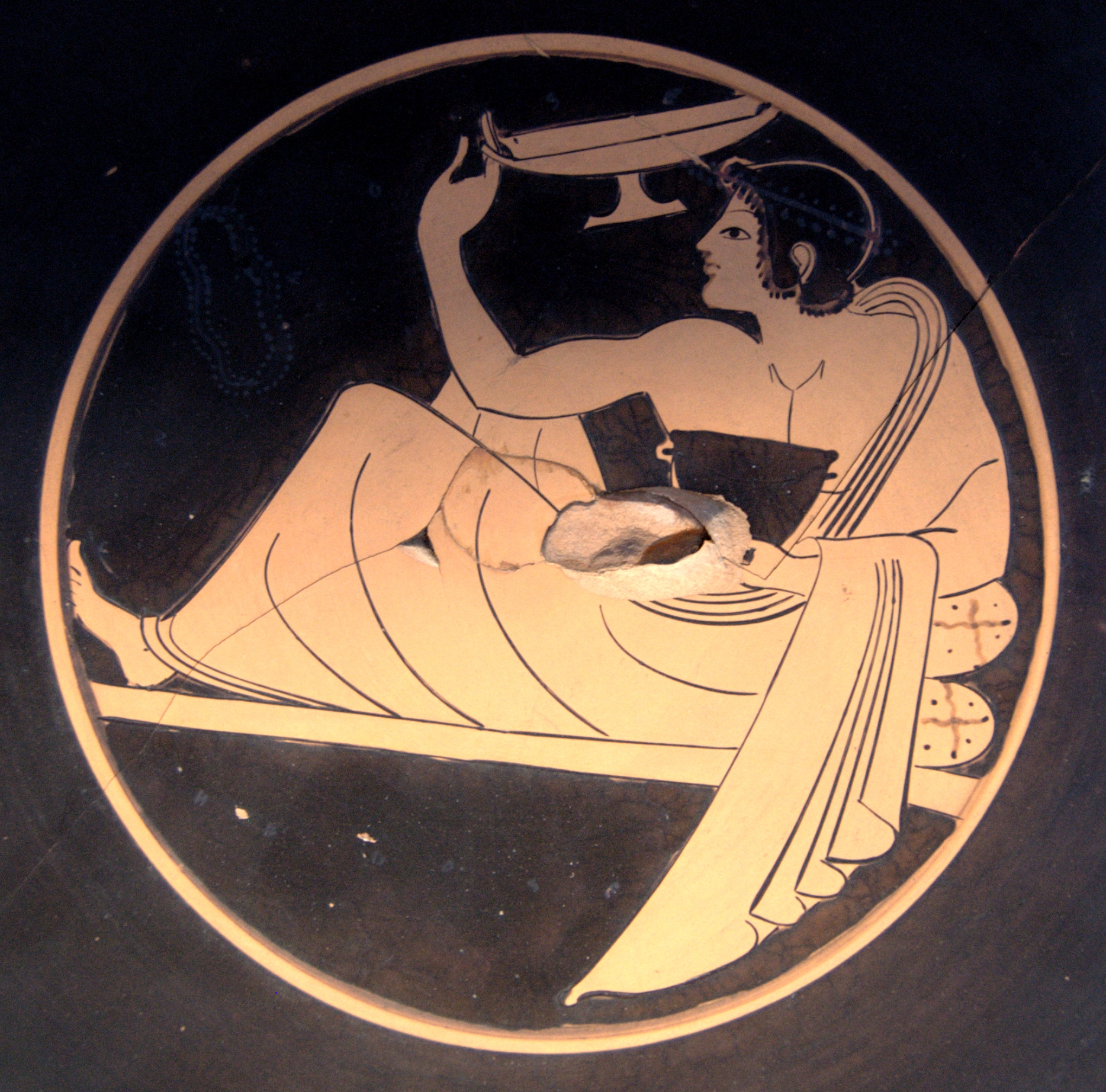
Banqueter playing kottabos, a playful subversion of the libation, ca. 510 BCE, Louvre

The symposium (συμπόσιον sympósion), traditionally translated as "banquet", but more literally "gathering of drinkers", was one of the preferred pastimes for Greek men. It consisted of two parts: the first dedicated to food, generally rather simple, and a second part dedicated to drinking. However, wine was consumed with the food, and the beverages were accompanied by snacks (τραγήματα tragēmata) such as chestnuts, beans, toasted wheat, or honey cakes, all intended to absorb alcohol and extend the drinking spree.

The second part was inaugurated with a libation, most often in honor of Dionysus, followed by conversation or table games, such as kottabos. The guests would recline on couches (κλίναι klínai); low tables held the food or game boards.

Dancers, acrobats, and musicians would entertain the wealthy banqueters. A "king of the banquet" was drawn by lots; he had to direct the slaves as to how strong to mix the wine.

With the exception of courtesans, the banquet was strictly reserved for men. It was an essential element of Greek social life. Great feasts could only be afforded by the rich; in most Greek homes, religious feasts or family events were the occasion of more modest banquets.

The banquet became the setting of a specific genre of literature, giving birth to Plato's Symposium, Xenophon's work of the same name, the Table Talk of Plutarch's Moralia, and the Deipnosophists (Banquet of the Learned) of Athenaeus.

==== Syssitia ====
The syssitia (τὰ συσσίτια tà syssítia) were mandatory meals shared by social or religious groups for men and youths, especially in Crete and Sparta. They were referred to variously as hetairia, pheiditia, or andreia (literally, "belonging to men").

They served as both a kind of aristocratic club and as a military mess. Like the symposium, the syssitia was the exclusive domain of men – although some references have been found to substantiate all-female syssitia. Unlike the symposium, these meals were hallmarked by simplicity and temperance.

== Ingredients and dishes ==
First she set for them a fair and well made table that had feet of cyanus; On it there was a vessel of bronze and an onion to give relish to the drink, with honey and cakes of barley meal.

— Homer, Iliad Book XI

=== Grains ===
==== Breads, cakes and biscuits ====
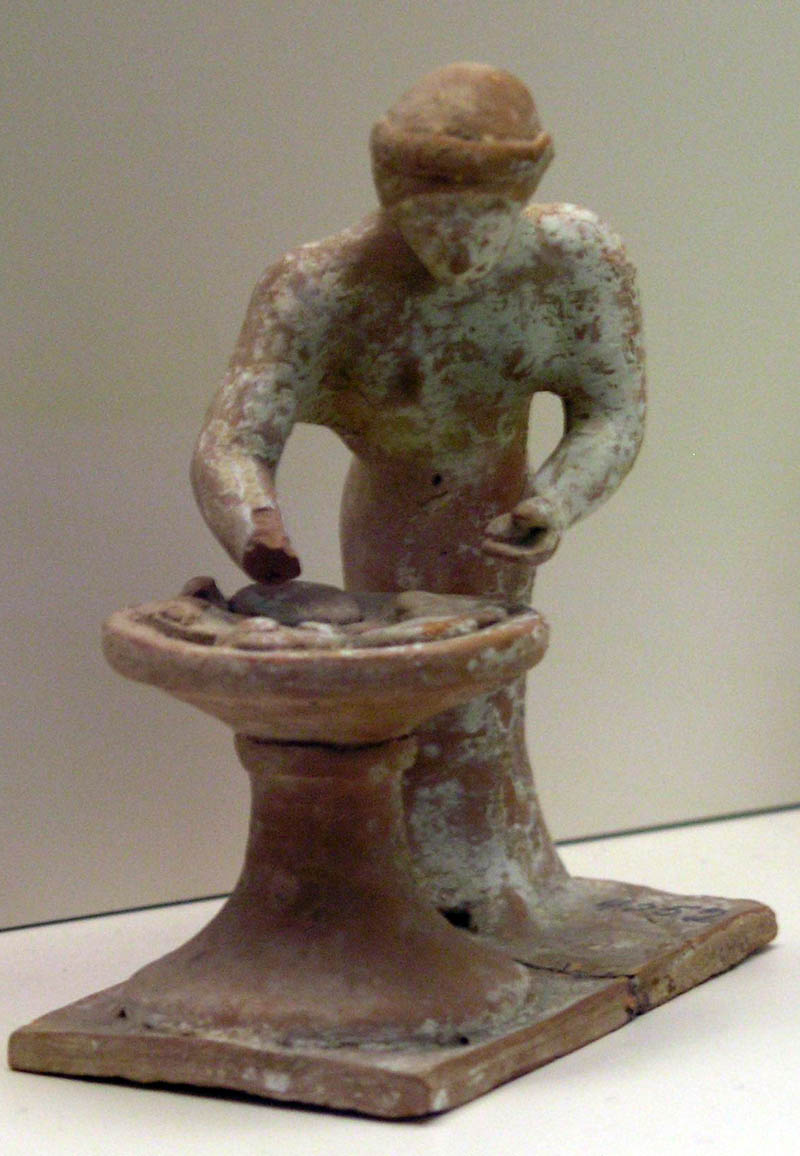
Woman kneading bread, c. 500–475 BCE, National Archaeological Museum of Athens

Cereals formed the staple diet. The two main grains were wheat (σῖτος sītos) and barley (κριθή krithē).

When Greece was conquered by Rome during the 2nd century B.C., commercial bakeries were well known and spread. In fact, Pliny the Elder suggests that the production of bread moved from the family to the "industrial" thanks to the work of skilled artisans (according to Pliny, starting from 171 BCE). Plato favored home production over commercial production and in Gorgias, described Thearion the baker as an Athenian novelty who sells goods that could be made at home.

In ancient Greece, bread was served with accompaniments known as opson ὄψον, sometimes rendered in English as "relish". This was a generic term which referred to anything which accompanied this staple food, whether meat or fish, fruit or vegetable.

Cakes may have been consumed for religious reasons as well as secular. Philoxenus of Cythera describes in detail some cakes that were eaten as part of an elaborate dinner using the traditional dithyrambic style used for sacred Dionysian hymns: "mixed with safflower, toasted, wheat-oat-white-chickpea-little thistle-little-sesame-honey-mouthful of everything, with a honey rim".

Athenaeus says the charisios was eaten at the "all-night festival", but John Wilkins notes that the distinction between the sacred and secular can be blurred in antiquity.

Melitoutta (Ancient Greek: μελιτοῦττα), was a honeycake and oinoutta (οἰνοῦττα) was a cake or porridge of barley mixed with wine, water, and oil. Placenta cake was a thin, flat cake of flour, mixed with cheese and honey.

Itrion (ἴτριον), was a biscuit/cake made with sesame seeds and honey, similar to the modern Sesame seed candy.

Kopte sesamis (κοπτὴ σησαμίς), sometimes called simply κοπτὴ, was a cake made from pounded sesame.

Psamiton (Ψάμιτον) was a kind of a cake.

Crepis (Κρηπίς) was a type of cake or pancake filled with fruit.

Diakonion (Διακόνιον) had multiple meanings in ancient sources. Some described it as the crust of a pastry. The writer Menekles explained that during the Athenian festival for Apollo, when the Eiresione was made, round pastries were included and called diakonion. Similarly, Amerias noted that diakonia (διακόνια; plural of diakonion) were pastries prepared for Apollo during this ritual. However, other sources describe it as a type of broth, while some say it was a kind of barley cake.

Elater (Ἐλατήρ) was a flat, hand-pressed cake or pastry, named from being flattened with the hands. It could also be a hollow loaf of bread used to hold bean stew for offerings at altars. The genitive form ἐλατῆρος denotes a kind of unleavened cake, which Euripides calls pepta (πεπτά). There were also flattish cakes named lagarοdeis from lagaron (λαγαρόν; "hollow"), while Euripides used the term pelanoi (πέλανοι).

Philoxenean flat cakes (Φιλοξένειοι πλακοῦντες), named after Philoxenus.

Popanum or Popanon (Πόπανον) was a type of sacrificial cake.

Arester (Ἀρεστήρ) was a sacrificial cake, its name coming from ἀρεστόν, meaning "pleasing".

==== Wheat ====
Wheat grains were softened by soaking, then either reduced into gruel, or ground into flour (ἀλείατα aleíata) and kneaded and formed into loaves (ἄρτος ártos) or flatbreads, either plain or mixed with cheese or honey. The small loaf was called artidion (ἀρτίδιον). Leavening was known; the Greeks later used an alkali (νίτρον nítron) and wine yeast as leavening agents. Dough loaves were baked at home in a clay oven (ἰπνός ipnós) set on legs.

Bread wheat, difficult to grow in Mediterranean climates, and the white bread made from it, were associated with the upper classes in the ancient Mediterranean, while the poor ate coarse brown breads made from emmer wheat and barley.

A simpler baking method involved placing lighted coals on the floor and covering the heap with a dome-shaped lid (πνιγεύς pnigeús); when it was hot enough, the coals were swept aside, and dough loaves were placed on the warm floor. The lid was then put back in place, and the coals were gathered on the side of the cover.

The stone oven did not appear until the Roman period. Solon, an Athenian lawmaker of the 6th century BCE, prescribed that leavened bread be reserved for feast days. By the end of the 5th century BCE, leavened bread was sold at the market, though it was expensive.

==== Barley ====
Barley was easier to grow than wheat, but more difficult to make bread from. Barley-based breads were nourishing but very heavy. Because of this, it was often roasted before being milled into coarse flour (ἄλφιτα álphita). Barley flour was used to make μᾶζα maza, the basic Greek dish. Maza could be served cooked or raw, as a broth, or made into dumplings or flatbreads. Like wheat breads, it could also be augmented with cheese or honey.

In Peace, Aristophanes employs the expression ἐσθίειν κριθὰς μόνας, literally "to eat only barley", with a meaning equivalent to the English "diet of bread and water".

==== Millet ====
Millet was growing wild in Greece as early as 3000 BCE, and bulk storage containers for millet have been found from the Late Bronze Age in Macedonia and northern Greece. Hesiod describes that "the beards grow round the millet, which men sow in summer."

Millet is listed along with wheat in the 3rd century BCE by Theophrastus in his "Enquiry into Plants"

==== Emmer ====
Black bread, made from emmer (sometimes called "emmer wheat"), was cheaper (and easier to make) than wheat; it was associated with the lower classes and the poor.

=== Legumes ===
Legumes were essential to the Greek diet, and were harvested in the Mediterranean region from prehistoric times: the earliest and most common being lentils - which have been found in archeological sites in Greece dating to the Upper Paleolithic period. As one of the first domesticated crops to be introduced to Greece, lentils are commonly found at regional archaeological sites from the Upper Paleolithic.

Lentils and chickpeas are the most frequently mentioned legumes in classical literature.

- Bitter vetch – This plant was present in Greece from at least 8000 BCE, and was occasionally eaten in Classical times. Most ancient literature that mentions it describes it as animal food and having a disagreeable taste. Several classical authors suggest medicinal uses for it.
- Black beans – Homer mentions the threshing a black bean (not black turtle beans) as a metaphor in the Iliad
- Broad beans – Broad, or Fava Beans are rare in archeological sites, but are common in classical literature. They were eaten both as main dishes and also included in desserts (mixed with figs). In addition to describing them as food, classical authors attribute various medicinal qualities to the beans.
- Chickpeas – Chickpeas are mentioned almost as frequently in classical literature as lentils (by Aristophanes and Theophrastus among others), but are found rarely in archeological sites in Greece. As they are found in prehistoric sites in the Middle East and India, it is likely their use was a late addition to the Ancient Greek diet
- Grass peas – Like bitter vetch, grass peas were grown in ancient Greece mainly for animal fodder, however they were occasionally eaten in times of famine
- Lentils – Theophrastus states that "of the leguminous plants, the lentil is the most prolific"
- Lupin bean – Lupin (or Lupine, Lupini) beans were present in the Mediterranean region from prehistoric times and were cultivated in Egypt by at least 2000 BCE. By classical times, the Greeks were using them for both food and animal fodder.
- Garden peas – Peas are commonly found in some of the earliest archaeological sites in Greece, but are rarely mentioned in classical literature. However Hesiod and Theophrastus both include them as food eaten by Greeks

=== Fruit and vegetables ===
In ancient Greece, fruit and vegetables were a significant part of the diet, as the ancient Greeks consumed much less meat than in the typical diet of modern societies. Legumes would have been important crops, as their ability to replenish exhausted soil was known at least by the time of Xenophon.

Hesiod (7th-8th century BCE) describes many crops eaten by the ancient Greeks, among these are artichokes and peas.

Vegetables were eaten as soups, boiled or mashed (ἔτνος etnos), seasoned with olive oil, vinegar, herbs or γάρον gáron, a fish sauce similar to Vietnamese nước mắm. In the comedies of Aristophanes, Heracles was portrayed as a glutton with a fondness for mashed beans. Poor families ate oak acorns (βάλανοι balanoi). Olives were a common appetizer.

In the cities, fresh vegetables were expensive, and therefore, the poorer city dwellers had to make do with dried vegetables. Lentil soup (φακῆ phakē) was the workman's typical dish. Cheese, garlic, and onions were the soldier's traditional fare. In Aristophanes' Peace, the smell of onions typically represents soldiers; the chorus, celebrating the end of war, sings Oh! joy, joy! No more helmet, no more cheese nor onions! Bitter vetch (ὄροβος orobos) was considered a famine food.

Fruits, fresh or dried, and nuts, were eaten as dessert. Important fruits were figs, raisins, dates and pomegranates. In Athenaeus' Deipnosophistae, he describes a dessert made of figs and broad beans. Dried figs were also eaten as an appetizer or when drinking wine. In the latter case, they were often accompanied by grilled chestnuts, chick peas, and beechnuts.

=== Animals ===
==== Meat ====
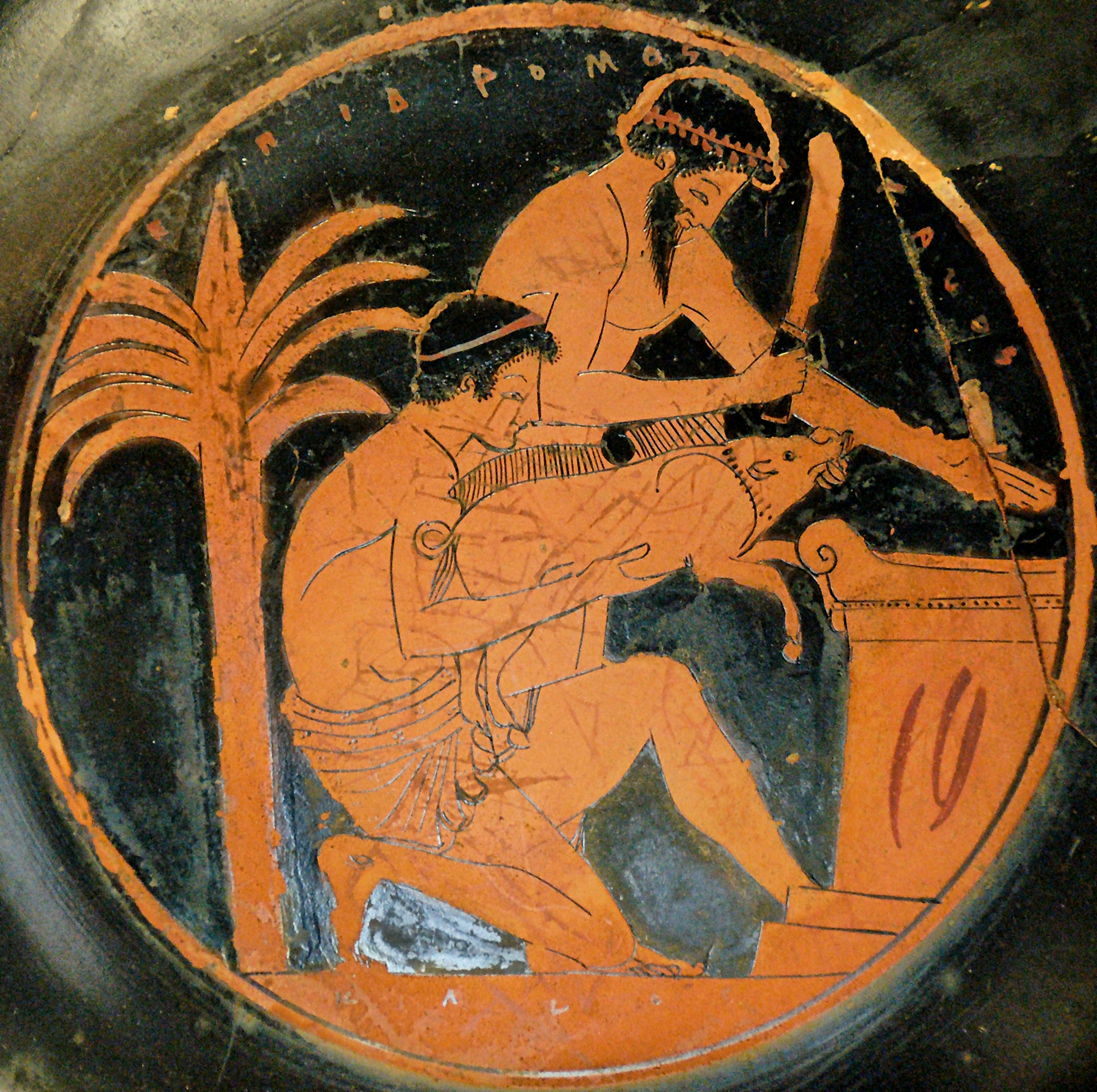
Sacrifice; principal source of meat for city dwellers — here a boar; tondo of an Attic kylix by the Epidromos Painter, c. 510–500 BCE, Louvre.

In the 8th century BCE, Hesiod describes the ideal country feast in Works and Days:

But at that time let me have a shady rock and Bibline wine, a clot of curds and milk of drained goats with the flesh of a heifer fed in the woods, that has never calved, and of firstling kids; then also let me drink bright wine…

Meat is much less prominent in texts of the 5th century BCE onwards than in the earliest poetry, but this may be a matter of genre rather than real evidence of changes in farming and food customs. Fresh meat was most commonly eaten at sacrifices, though sausage was much more common, consumed by people across the economic spectrum. In addition to the flesh of animals, the ancient Greeks often ate inner organs, many of which were considered delicacies such as paunches and tripe.

But above all I do delight in dishes

Of paunches and of tripe from gelded beasts,

And love a fragrant pig within the oven.

— Hipparchus (c.190 – c.120 BCE),

Hippolochus (3rd Century BCE) describes a wedding banquet in Macedonia with "chickens and ducks, and ringdoves, too, and a goose, and an abundance of suchlike viands piled high... following which came a second platter of silver, on which again lay a huge loaf, and geese, hares, young goats, and curiously moulded cakes besides, pigeons, turtle-doves, partridges, and other fowl in plenty..." and "a roast pig — a big one, too — which lay on its back upon it; the belly, seen from above, disclosed that it was full of many bounties. For, roasted inside it, were thrushes, ducks, and warblers in unlimited number, pease purée poured over eggs, oysters, and scallops"

Spartans primarily ate a soup made from pigs' legs and blood, known as melas zōmos (μέλας ζωμός), which means "black soup". According to Plutarch, it was "so much valued that the elderly men fed only upon that, leaving what flesh there was to the younger". It was famous amongst the Greeks. "Naturally Spartans are the bravest men in the world", joked a Sybarite, "anyone in his senses would rather die ten thousand times than take his share of such a sorry diet". It was made with pork, salt, vinegar and blood. The dish was served with maza, figs and cheese sometimes supplemented with game and fish. The 2nd–3rd century author Aelian claims that Spartan cooks were prohibited from cooking anything other than meat.

The consumption of fish and meat varied in accordance with the wealth and location of the household; in the country, hunting (primarily trapping) allowed for consumption of birds and hares. Peasants also had farmyards to provide them with chickens and geese. Slightly wealthier landowners could raise goats, pigs, or sheep. In the city, meat was expensive except for pork. In Aristophanes' day a piglet cost three drachmas, which was three days' wages for a public servant. Sausages were common both for the poor and the rich. Archaeological excavations at Kavousi Kastro, Lerna, and Kastanas have shown that dogs were sometimes consumed in Bronze Age Greece, in addition to the more commonly-consumed pigs, cattle, sheep, and goats.

==== Fish ====
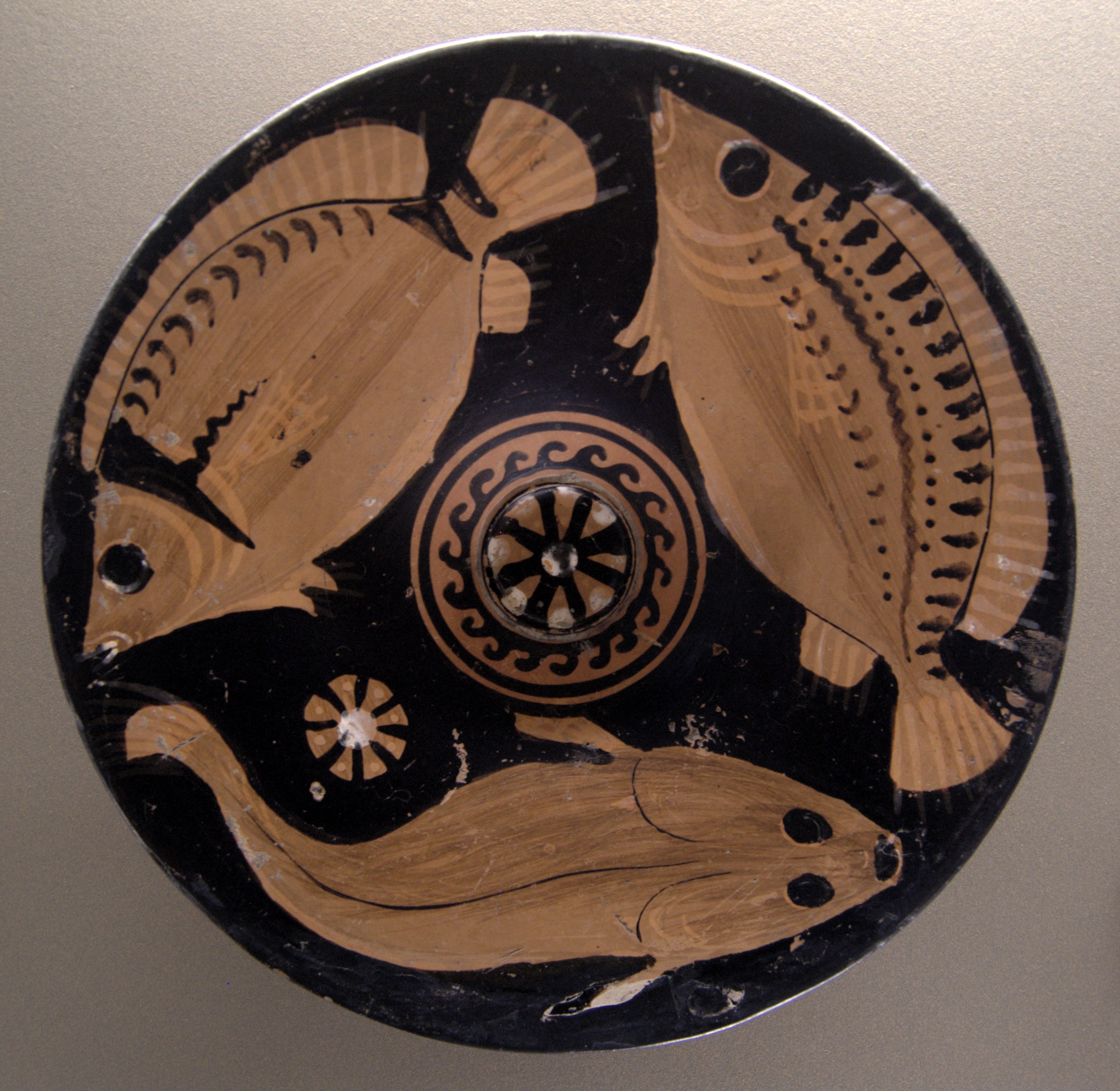
Fresh fish, one of the favourite dishes of the Greeks, platter with red figures, c. 350–325 BCE, Louvre

Herodotus describes a "large fish... of the sort called Antacaei, without any prickly bones, and good for pickling," probably beluga found in Greek colonies along the Dnieper River. Other ancient writers mention skipjack tuna (pelamys); tuna (thynnoi); swordfish (xifiai); sea raven (korakinoi); black carp (melanes kyprinoi), porpoise (phykaina), and mackerel (scomber).

In the Greek islands and on the coast, fresh fish and seafood (squid, octopus, and shellfish) were common. They were eaten locally but more often transported inland. Sardines and anchovies were regular fare for the citizens of Athens. They were sometimes sold fresh, but more frequently salted. A stele of the late 3rd century BCE from the small Boeotian city of Akraiphia, on Lake Copais, provides us with a list of fish prices. The cheapest was skaren (probably parrotfish) whereas Atlantic bluefin tuna was three times as expensive. Common salt water fish were yellowfin tuna, red mullet, ray, swordfish or sturgeon, a delicacy which was eaten salted. Lake Copais itself was famous in all Greece for its eels, celebrated by the hero of The Acharnians. Other fresh water fish were pike-fish, carp and the less appreciated catfish. In classical Athens, eels, conger-eels, and sea-perch (ὈρΦὸς) were considered to be great delicacies, while sprats were cheap and readily available.

==== Fowl ====
Ancient Greeks consumed a much wider variety of birds than is typical today. Pheasants were present as early as 2000 BCE. Domestic chickens were brought to Greece from Asia Minor as early as 600 BCE, and domesticated geese are described in The Odyssey (800 BCE). Quail, moorhen, capon, mallards, pheasants, larks, pigeons and doves were all domesticated in classical times, and were even for sale in markets. Additionally, thrush, blackbirds, chaffinch, lark, starling, jay, jackdaw, sparrow, siskin, blackcap, Rock partridge, grebe, plover, coot, wagtail, francolin, and even cranes were hunted, or trapped, and eaten, and sometimes available in markets.

=== Eggs and dairy products ===
==== Eggs ====
Greeks bred quails and hens, partly for their eggs. Some authors also praise pheasant eggs and Egyptian goose eggs, which were presumably rather rare. Eggs were cooked soft- or hard-boiled as hors d'œuvre or dessert. Whites, yolks and whole eggs were also used as ingredients in the preparation of dishes.

==== Milk ====
Hesiod describes "milk cake, and milk of goats drained dry" in his Works and Days. Country dwellers drank milk (γάλα gala), but it was seldom used in cooking.

==== Butter ====
Butter (βούτυρον bouturon) was known but seldom used: Greeks saw it as a culinary trait of the Thracians of the northern Aegean coast, whom the Middle Comic poet Anaxandrides dubbed "butter eaters".

==== Cheese and yogurt ====
Cheesemaking was widespread by the 8th Century BCE, as the technical vocabulary associated with it is included in The Odyssey.

Greeks enjoyed other dairy products. Πυριατή pyriatē and Oxygala (οξύγαλα) were curdled milk products, similar to cottage cheese or perhaps to yogurt. Most of all, goat's and ewe's cheese (τυρός tyros) was a staple food. Fresh cheeses (sometimes wrapped in dragon arum leaves to retain freshness) and hard cheeses were sold in different shops; the former cost about two thirds of the latter's price.

Cheese was eaten alone or with honey or vegetables. It was also used as an ingredient in the preparation of many dishes, including fish dishes (see recipe below by Mithaecus). However, the addition of cheese seems to have been a controversial matter; Archestratus warns his readers that Syracusan cooks spoil good fish by adding cheese.

=== Stuffed and Wrapped Foods ===
Athenaeus describes a variety of stuffed dishes, including squid, spleen, ray, sheep, goose, boar, pig, piglet, and fig leaves. He also mentions foods wrapped in various coverings, including oysters wrapped in seaweed, liver wrapped in caul, eels wrapped in beet leaves, fish wrapped in fig leaves, and meat wrapped in fig leaves.

The ancient Greeks also prepared a dish by filling fresh fig leaves with a mixture of cheese, eggs, milk, honey, and flour, then frying them.

Thrion, meaning "fig leaf" (plural: thria), referred to dishes prepared using fig leaves, of which several varieties existed. One version consisted of pork fat, kid goat meat, wheaten flour, milk and a mixture containing raw egg. These ingredients were combined to form a thick mixture, which was then wrapped in fig leaves. Another variety consisted of brains mixed with fish sauce and cheese, wrapped in fig leaves and roasted.

=== Spices and seasonings ===
The first spice mentioned in Ancient Greek writings is cassia: Sappho (6th-7th Century BCE) mentions it in her poem on the marriage of Hector and Andromache. The ancient Greeks made a distinction between Ceylon cinnamon and cassia.

Ancient Greeks used at least two forms of pepper in cooking and medicine: one of Aristotle's students, Theophrastus, in describing the plants that appeared in Greece as a result of Alexander's conquest of India and Asia Minor, listed both black pepper and long pepper, stating "one is round like bitter vetch...: the other is elongated and black and has seeds like those of a poppy : and this kind is much stronger than the other. Both however are heating...".

Theophrastus lists several plants in his book as "pot herbs" including dill, coriander, anise, cumin, fennel, rue, celery and celery seed.

=== Recipes ===
Homer describes the preparation of a wine and cheese drink: taking "Pramnian wine she grated goat's milk cheese into it with a bronze grater [and] threw in a handful of white barley meal." (Book 11 of the Iliad)

One fragment survives of the first known cookbook in any culture, it was written by Mithaecus (5th Century BCE) and is quoted in the "Deipnosophistae" of Athenaeus. It is a recipe for a fish called "tainia" (meaning "ribbon" in Ancient Greek - probably the species Cepola macrophthalma),

"Tainia": gut, discard the head, rinse, slice; add cheese and [olive] oil.

Archestratus (4th Century BCE), the self-titled "inventor of made dishes", describes a recipe for paunch and tripe, cooked in "cumin juice, and vinegar and sharp, strong-smelling silphium".

== Drink ==
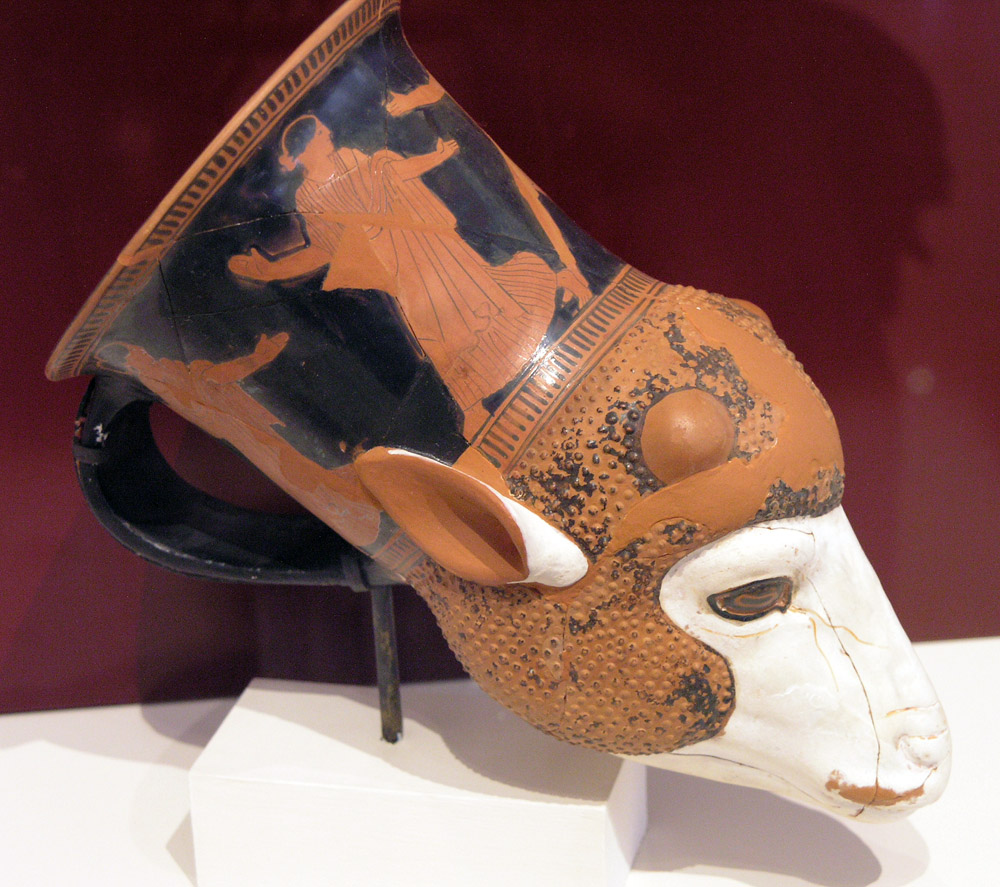
Attic Rhyton, c. 460–450 BCE, National Archaeological Museum of Athens.

The most widespread drink was water. Fetching water was a daily task for women. Though wells were common, spring water was preferred: it was recognized as nutritious because it caused plants and trees to grow, and also as a desirable beverage. Pindar called spring water "as agreeable as honey".

The Greeks would describe water as robust, heavy or light, dry, acidic, pungent, wine-like, etc. One of the comic poet Antiphanes's characters claimed that he could recognize Attic water by taste alone. Athenaeus states that a number of philosophers had a reputation for drinking nothing but water, a habit combined with a vegetarian diet (see below). Milk, usually goats' milk, was not widely consumed, being considered barbaric.

The usual drinking vessel was the skyphos, made out of wood, terra cotta, or metal. Critias also mentions the kothon, a Spartan goblet which had the military advantage of hiding the colour of the water from view and trapping mud in its edge. The ancient Greeks also used a vessel called a kylix (a shallow footed bowl), and for banquets the kantharos (a deep cup with handles) or the rhyton, a drinking horn often moulded into the form of a human or animal head.

=== Wine ===
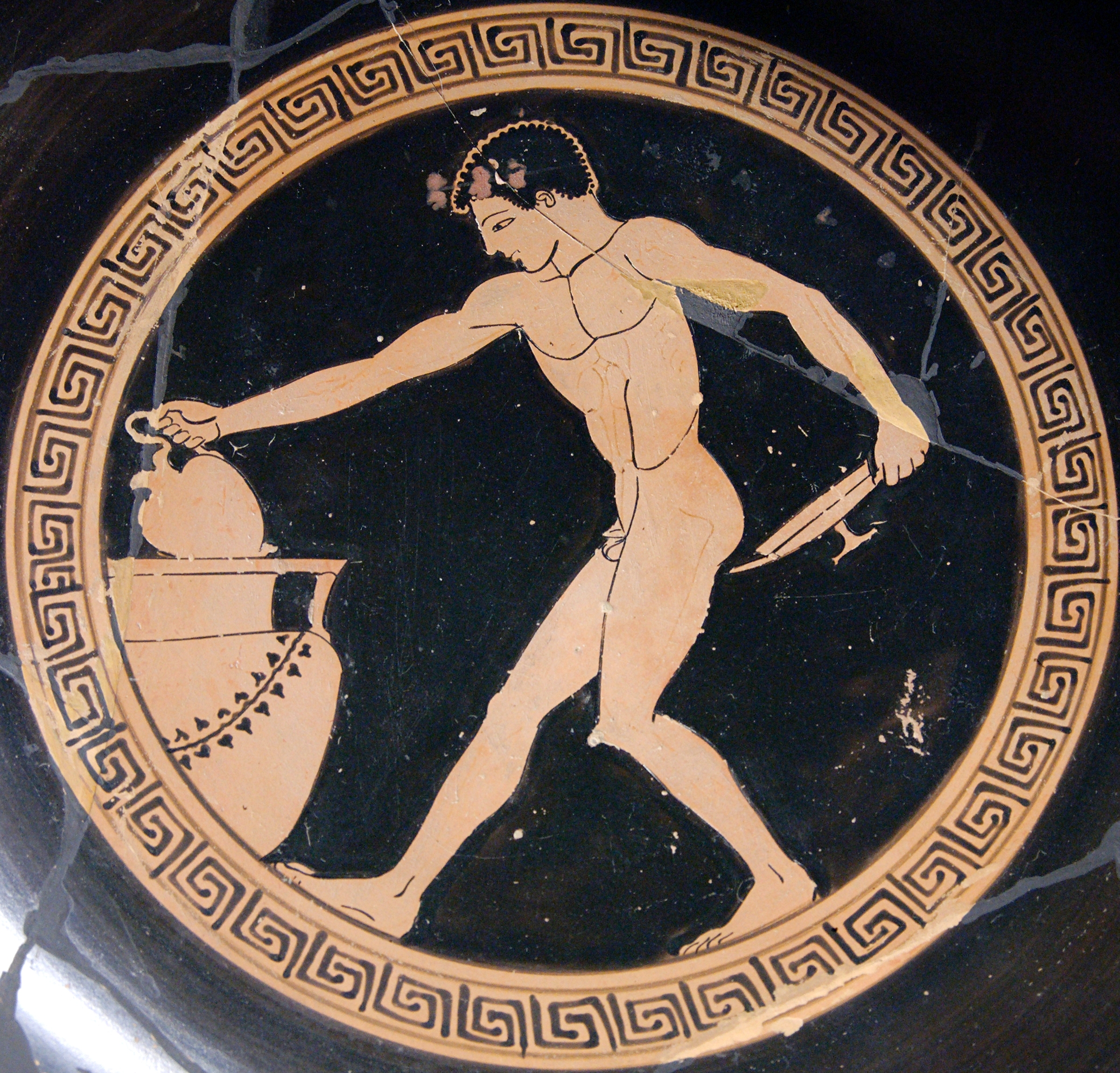
A banqueter reaches into a krater with an oenochoe to replenish his kylix with wine, c. 490–480 BCE, Louvre

The Greeks are thought to have made red as well as rosé and white wines. Like today, these varied in quality from common table wine to valuable vintages. It was generally considered that the best wines came from Thásos, Lesbos and Chios.

Cretan wine came to prominence later. A secondary wine made from water and pomace (the residue from squeezed grapes), mixed with lees, was made by country people for their own use. The Greeks sometimes sweetened their wine with honey and made medicinal wines by adding thyme, pennyroyal and other herbs. By the first century, if not before, they were familiar with wine flavoured with pine resin (modern retsina). Aelian also mentions a wine mixed with perfume. Cooked wine was known, as well as a sweet wine from Thásos, similar to port wine.

Wine was generally cut with water. The drinking of akraton or "unmixed wine", though known to be practised by northern barbarians, was thought likely to lead to madness and death. Wine was mixed in a krater, from which the slaves would fill the drinker's kylix with an oinochoe (jugs). Wine was also thought to have medicinal powers. Aelian mentions that the wine from Heraia in Arcadia rendered men foolish but women fertile; conversely, Achaean wine was thought to induce abortion.

Outside of these therapeutic uses, Greek society did not approve of women drinking wine. According to Aelian, a Massalian law prohibited this and restricted women to drinking water. Sparta was the only city where women routinely drank wine.

Wine reserved for local use was kept in skins. That destined for sale was poured into πίθοι pithoi, (large terra cotta jugs). From there they were decanted into amphoras sealed with pitch for retail sale. Vintage wines carried stamps from the producers or city magistrates who guaranteed their origin. This is one of the first instances of indicating the geographical or qualitative provenance of a product.

=== Kykeon ===
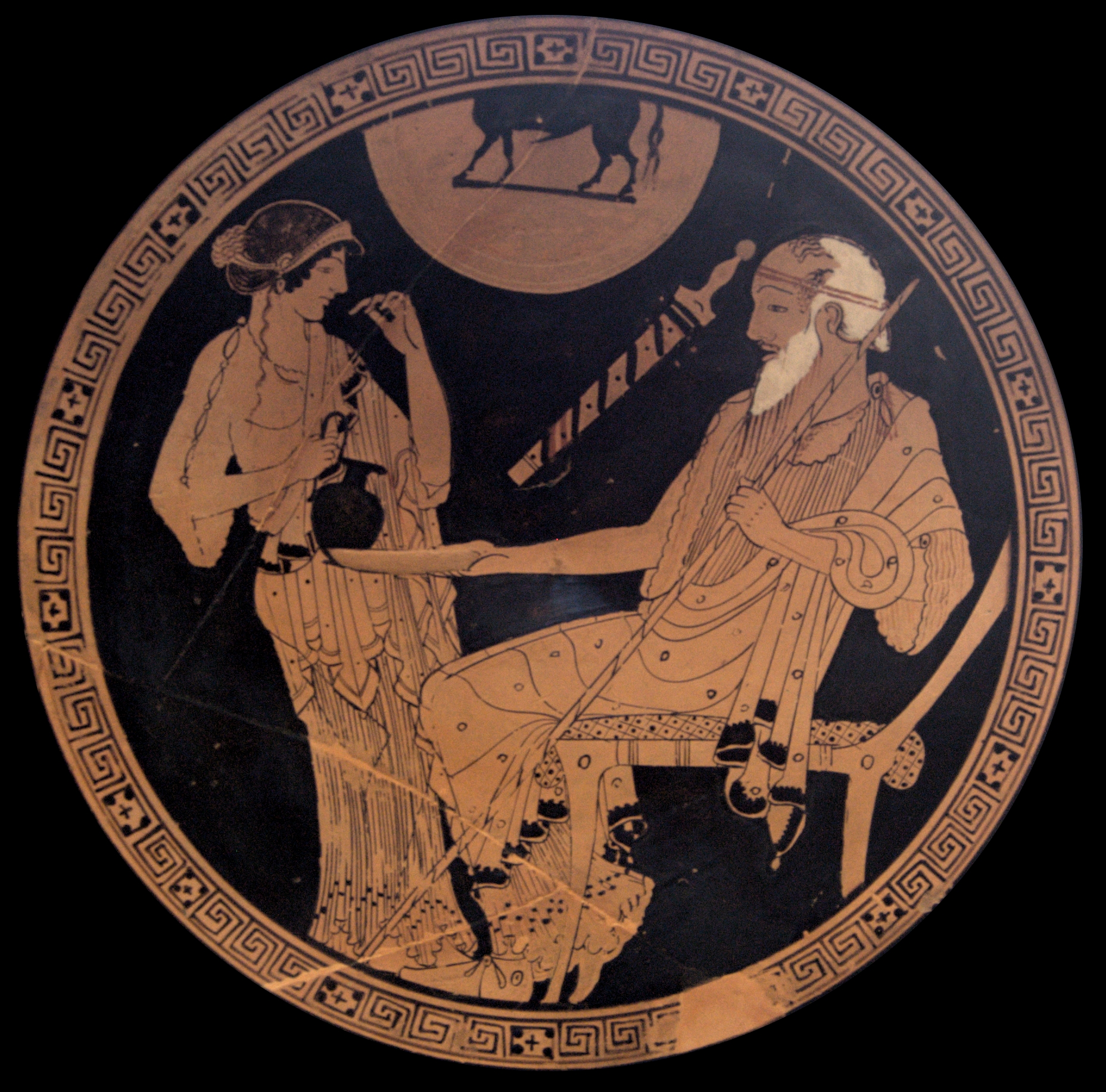
Hecamede preparing kykeon for Nestor, kylix by the Brygos Painter, ca. 490 BCE, Louvre

The Greeks also drank kykeon (κυκεών, from κυκάω kykaō, "to shake, to mix"), which was both a beverage and a meal. It was a barley gruel, to which water and herbs were added. In the Iliad, the beverage also contained grated goat cheese. In the Odyssey, Circe adds honey and a magic potion to it. In the Homeric Hymn to Demeter, the goddess refuses red wine but accepts a kykeon made of water, flour, and pennyroyal.

Used as a ritual beverage in the Eleusinian Mysteries, kykeon was also a popular beverage, especially in the countryside: Theophrastus, in his Characters, describes a boorish peasant as having drunk much kykeon and inconveniencing the Assembly with his bad breath. It also had a reputation as a good digestive, and as such, in Peace, Hermes recommends it to the main character who has eaten too much dried fruit.

== Ancient writers ==
- Timachidas of Rhodes wrote 11 books with dinner recipes.
- Noumenios wrote cookbooks.
- Matreas the Pitanean wrote cookbooks.
- Hegemon the Thasian, who was called Lentil-soup, wrote cookbooks.
- Artemidoros, who was called the Pseudoaristophanean, wrote cookbooks.
- Philoxenos, son of Leukadios wrote cookbooks. In addition, some flat-cakes took their names from him and were called Philoxenean (Φιλοξένειοι πλακοῦντες).
- Paxamus wrote a cookbook.
- Mithaecus wrote cookbooks.
- Zopyrinus (Ζωπύρινος) wrote works on cookery.
- Athenaeus work called Deipnosophistae is an important source of recipes in classical Greece. Furthermore, in his work he mentioned several ancient authors (termed δειπνολόγοι), but their writings have now lost and only fragments quoted by him survive.
- Philoxenus of Cythera, in his work "Banquet", describes many dishes. Although it is not a cookbook but a poem. Fragments of his work are preserved by Athenaeus.
- Archestratus, the author of a gastronomic poem in epic verse, is mentioned by several ancient authors. According to Athenaeus, Chrysippus referred to his work as "Gastronomia", while Lynceus of Samos and Callimachus called it "The Art of High Living", and Clearchus of Soli referred to it as "The Art of Dining", and other authors "The Art of Fine Cookery".
- Hippolochus of Macedon.
- Epaenetus.

== Cultural beliefs about the role of food ==
Food played an important part in the Greek mode of thought. Classicist John Wilkins notes that "in the Odyssey for example, good men are distinguished from bad and Greeks from foreigners partly in terms of how and what they ate. Herodotus identified people partly in terms of food and eating".

Up to the 3rd century BCE, the frugality imposed by the physical and climatic conditions of the country was held as virtuous. The Greeks did not ignore the pleasures of eating, but valued simplicity. The rural writer Hesiod, as cited above, spoke of his "flesh of a heifer fed in the woods, that has never calved, and of firstling kids" as being the perfect closing to a day. Nonetheless, Chrysippus is quoted as saying that the best meal was a free one.

Culinary and gastronomical research was rejected as a sign of decadence: the inhabitants of the Persian Empire were considered so due to their luxurious taste, which manifested itself in their cuisine. The Greek authors took pleasure in describing the table of the Achaemenid Great King and his court: Herodotus, Clearchus of Soli, Strabo and Ctesias were unanimous in their descriptions.

In contrast, Greeks as a whole stressed the austerity of their own diet. Plutarch tells how the king of Pontus, eager to try the Spartan "black gruel", bought a Laconian cook; 'but had no sooner tasted it than he found it extremely bad, which the cook observing, told him, "Sir, to make this broth relish, you should have bathed yourself first in the river Eurotas"'. According to Polyaenus, on discovering the dining hall of the Persian royal palace, Alexander the Great mocked their taste and blamed it for their defeat. Pausanias, on discovering the dining habits of the Persian commander Mardonius, equally ridiculed the Persians, "who having so much, came to rob the Greeks of their miserable living".

In consequence of this cult of frugality, and the diminished regard for cuisine it inspired, the kitchen long remained the domain of women, free or enslaved. In the classical period, however, culinary specialists began to enter the written record. Both Aelian and Athenaeus mention the thousand cooks who accompanied Smindyride of Sybaris on his voyage to Athens at the time of Cleisthenes, if only disapprovingly. Plato in Gorgias, mentions "Thearion the cook, Mithaecus the author of a treatise on Sicilian cooking, and Sarambos the wine merchant; three eminent connoisseurs of cake, kitchen and wine." Some chefs also wrote treatises on cuisine.

Over time, more and more Greeks presented themselves as gourmets. From the Hellenistic to the Roman period, the Greeks — at least the rich — no longer appeared to be any more austere than others. The cultivated guests of the feast hosted by Athenaeus in the 2nd or 3rd century devoted a large part of their conversation to wine and gastronomy. They discussed the merits of various wines, vegetables, and meats, mentioning renowned dishes (stuffed cuttlefish, red tuna belly, prawns, lettuce watered with mead) and great cooks such as Soterides, chef to king Nicomedes I of Bithynia (who reigned from the 279 to 250 BCE). When his master was inland, he pined for anchovies; Soterides simulated them from carefully carved turnips, oiled, salted and sprinkled with poppy seeds. Suidas (an encyclopaedia from the Byzantine period) mistakenly attributes this exploit to the celebrated Roman gourmet Apicius (1st century BCE) — which may be taken as evidence that the Greeks had reached the same level as the Romans.

== Specific diets ==
=== Vegetarianism ===
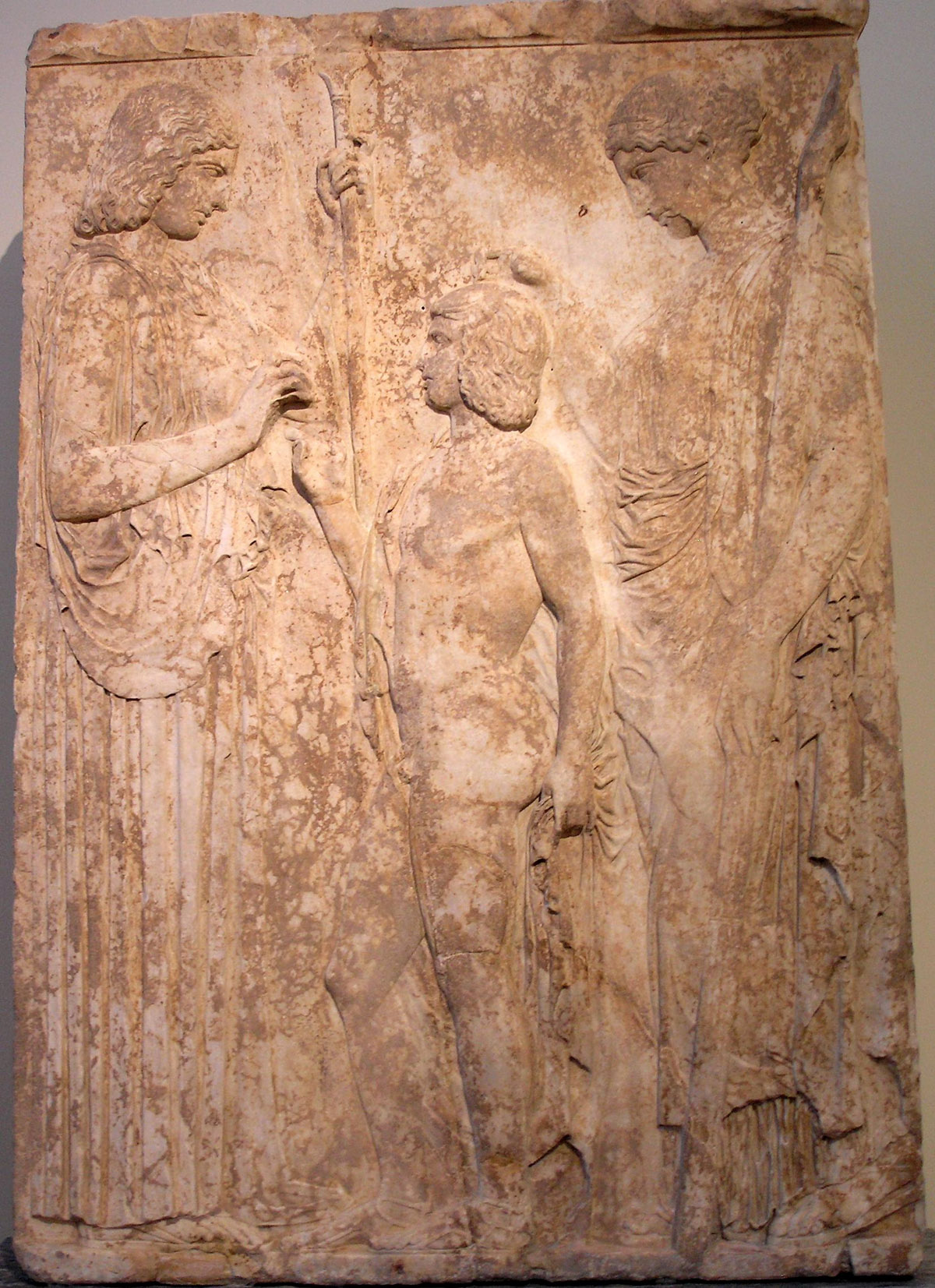
Triptolemus received wheat sheaves from Demeter and blessings from Persephone, 5th century BCE relief, National Archaeological Museum of Athens

Orphicism and Pythagoreanism, two common ancient Greek religions, suggested a different way of life, based on a concept of purity and thus purification (κάθαρσις katharsis) — a form of asceticism in the original sense: ἄσκησις askēsis initially signifies a ritual, then a specific way of life. Vegetarianism was a central element of Orphicism and of several variants of Pythagoreanism.

Empedocles (5th century BCE) justified vegetarianism by a belief in the transmigration of souls: who could guarantee that an animal about to be slaughtered did not house the soul of a human being? However, it can be observed that Empedocles also included plants in this transmigration, thus the same logic should have applied to eating them. Vegetarianism was also a consequence of a dislike for killing: "For Orpheus taught us rights and to refrain from killing".

The information from Pythagoras (6th century BCE) is more difficult to define. The Comedic authors such as Aristophanes and Alexis described Pythagoreans as strictly vegetarian, with some of them living on bread and water alone. Other traditions contented themselves with prohibiting the consumption of certain vegetables, such as the broad bean, or of sacred animals such as the white cock or selected animal parts.

It follows that vegetarianism and the idea of ascetic purity were closely associated, and often accompanied by sexual abstinence. In On the eating of flesh, Plutarch (1st–2nd century) elaborated on the barbarism of blood-spilling; inverting the usual terms of debate, he asked the meat-eater to justify his choice.

The Neoplatonic Porphyrius (3rd century) associates in On Abstinence vegetarianism with the Cretan mystery cults, and gives a census of past vegetarians, starting with the semi-mythical Epimenides. For him, the origin of vegetarianism was Demeter's gift of wheat to Triptolemus so that he could teach agriculture to humanity. His three commandments were: "Honour your parents", "Honour the gods with fruit", and "Spare the animals".

=== Athlete diets ===
Aelian claims that the first athlete to submit to a formal diet was Ikkos of Tarentum, a victor in the Olympic pentathlon (perhaps in 444 BCE). However, Olympic wrestling champion (62nd through 66th Olympiads) Milo of Croton was already said to eat twenty pounds of meat and twenty pounds of bread and to drink eight quarts of wine each day. Before his time, athletes were said to practice ξηροφαγία xērophagía (from ξηρός xēros, "dry"), a diet based on dry foods such as dried figs, fresh cheese and bread. Pythagoras (either the philosopher or a gymnastics master of the same name) was the first to direct athletes to eat meat.

Trainers later enforced some standard diet rules: to be an Olympic victor, "you have to eat according to regulations, keep away from desserts (…); you must not drink cold water nor can you have a drink of wine whenever you want". It seems this diet was primarily based on meat, for Galen (ca. 180 CE) accused athletes of his day of "always gorging themselves on flesh and blood". Pausanias also refers to a "meat diet".

== Tableware, serving, drinking and cooking vessels ==
- Apophorete (ἀποφορήτη) was a kind of utensil, described by Isidore, similar to a plate.
- Authepsa was a vessel which was used for heating water or for keeping it hot.
- Batiaca (βατιακή, βατιάκιον) was a drinking cup.
- Bicos was an earthen vessel used for holding wine and salted meat and fish.
- Caccabus (κάκκαβος, κακκάβη) was a cooking-pot. It seems that the caccabus was used for boiling meat, vegetables, and similar foods, and that it was set directly on the fire or on a trivet positioned above it.
- Carchesium was a drinking cup or beaker.
- Condy was a type of cup used for drinking wine.
- Cymbium (κυμβίον, κύμβος, κύμβη) was a small drinking vessel. It was generally employed for wine, but sometimes is also mentioned holding milk. It took its name from cymba (boat).
- Epichysis (ἐπίχυσις) was a handled wine jug with a narrow neck and a small lip.
- Hydria was a pot for fetching water. The etymology of the word hydria was first noted when it was stamped on a hydria itself, its direct translation meaning 'jug'.
- Mazonomus (μαζονόμος; from μάζα, a loaf or a cake) was a dish for distributing bread, but the term was also applied to any large dish used for bringing meat to table. These dishes were made either of wood, of bronze or of gold.
- Phiale (φιάλη) was a broad, flat dish or saucer used for drinking and for offering libations.
- Tarrion (ταρρίον) was a gridiron, a cooking device similar to a grill. Several examples have been discovered in the ruins of Pompeii. It is described as being made of silver and served at the dining table by slaves.
- Tyrokne (Τυρόκνη) and Tyroknestis (Τυρόκνηστις) were terms used to describe a type of cheese grater or knife.
- Kantharos was a cup used for drinking.
- Kylix was a two-handled drinking cup with a stemmed foot.
- Krater was a large two-handled type of vase mostly used for the mixing of wine with water.
- Kyathos was used as a ladle for dipping diluted wine from a wine mixer.
- Lagynos (Λάγυνος), wine flask.
- Lebes was a small, deep bowl found in both terracotta and bronze forms. Terracotta versions were likely used for mixing wine, while bronze ones were probably intended for cooking.
- Lekanis or lekane was a shallow, lidded dish used for various purposes. The shallow dish without a lid was called lekane, while if the dish had a rim designed to hold a lid, it was called a lekanis. Photios noted that while the term lekane was once used for a footbath, the lekanis and lekanion were known as handled vessels used for serving cooked food and similar purposes.
- Mastos was a drinking cup shaped like a breast, with a nipple at its base.
- Oinochoe was a wine jug.
- Psykter was used to cool wine.
- Rhyton was a drinking vessel shaped like a horn and usually in the form of an animal's head.
- Skyphos was a two-handled deep wine cup.

== See also ==
- Byzantine cuisine
- Greek cuisine
- List of ancient dishes
- Nutrition in classical antiquity
