= Myma =

Ancient Greek meat dish

Myma (μύμα or μῦμα, τό) is an ancient Greek meat dish that traditionally incorporated animal blood. In his Deipnosophists (662d, or XIV,82), the 2nd-century Greek rhetorician and grammarian Athenaeus quotes recipes from Artemidorus and Epaenetus, authors of cookery books who lived in the Hellenistic period.

Athenaeus indicatesː "such a food now is the myma, which I, my friends, am bringing you; concerning which Artemidorus, the pupil of Aristophanes, speaks in his Dictionary of Cookery, saying that it is prepared with meat and blood, wιth the addition also of a great deal of seasoning. And Epaenetus, in his treatise on Cookery, speaks as follows":

A myma of any sacrificial animal, or chicken, is to be made by chopping the lean meat finely, mincing liver and offal with blood, and flavouring with vinegar, melted cheese, silphium, cumin, thyme leaf, thyme seed, Roman hyssop, coriander leaf, coriander seed, Welsh onion, peeled fried onion (or poppy seed), raisins (or honey) and the seeds of a sour pomegranate. You may also use it as a relish.

A modern interpretation of Epaenetus's recipe is given by Mark Grant.

== See also ==
- Ancient Greek cuisine
