= Charles Gulick =

Charles Gulick may refer to:

- Charles T. Gulick (1841–1897), Kingdom of Hawaiʻi politician
- Charles Burton Gulick (1868–1962), American classical philologist
