= Nutrition in classical antiquity =

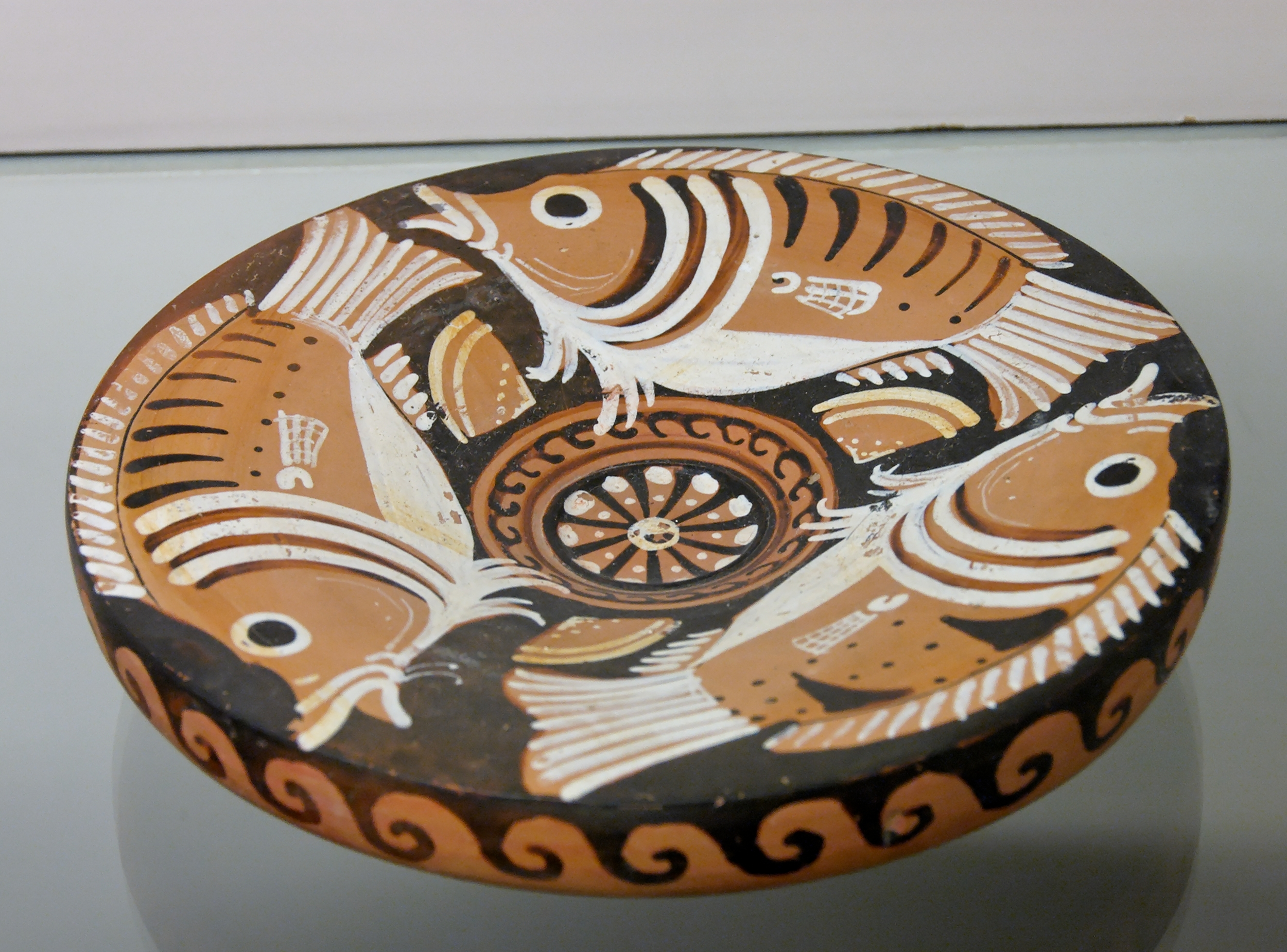
Three sea-perch and three limpets. Apulian red-figured fish plate, ca. 340–320 BC. British Museum

Classical antiquity is the period of cultural history spanning from the 8th century BC to the beginning of the Middle Ages (which began around 500 AD). The major civilizations are those of the Mediterranean region, ancient Greece, ancient Rome, and southwest Asia. Nutrition consisted of simple fresh or preserved whole foods that were either locally grown or transported from neighboring areas during times of crisis. Physicians and philosophers studied the effect of food on the human body and they generally agreed that food was important in preventing illness and restoring health.

== Food of antiquity ==
People ate various types of food; consumers had choices from dairy (milk and cheese), fruits (figs, pears, apples, and pomegranates), vegetables (greens and bulbs), grains and legumes (cereal, wheat, barley, millet, beans, and chickpeas), and meat (beef, mutton, fowl, mussels, and oysters). Food was most often fresh, but the processing of food aided in the preservation for long-term storage or transport to other cities. Cereals, olives, wine, legumes, vegetables, fruit, and animal products could all be processed and stored for later use. Cereals were often processed and stored in the form of bread, flat-cakes, and porridge. Legumes were also most often processed and stored as pulses and eaten with bread to enhance the flavor. Cereals were most nourishing providing essential macro- and micronutrients to consumers. Cereals sustained individuals with sufficient amounts of protein, vitamin B, vitamin E, calcium, and iron. Fruits and vegetables provided vitamin A, vitamin C, vitamin D, and half the dietary fiber needed for health support.

== Food shortage ==
Cities depended on trade with agricultural farmers and neighboring cities for food supply due to the lack of land cultivation area. Food supply was altered by numerous events such as climate, location, and distribution. Weather drastically affected the amount of produce harvested during a growing season. Climate often fluctuated in the Mediterranean region with varying temperatures and volumes of precipitation; these two factors also affected the quality of soil available to farmers. Soil composition mainly depended on location, but the climate affected the moisture retained within the soil. If the growing season was not prosperous then cities would have to resort to trade as a means for food supply. This often made food distribution difficult due to political disagreements and issues with transportation. To combat hunger due to inadequate food supply people would eat twigs, roots of plants, bark from trees, and each other as a last resort. Food shortages were frequent but did not last long enough to generate famine.

== People of interest ==
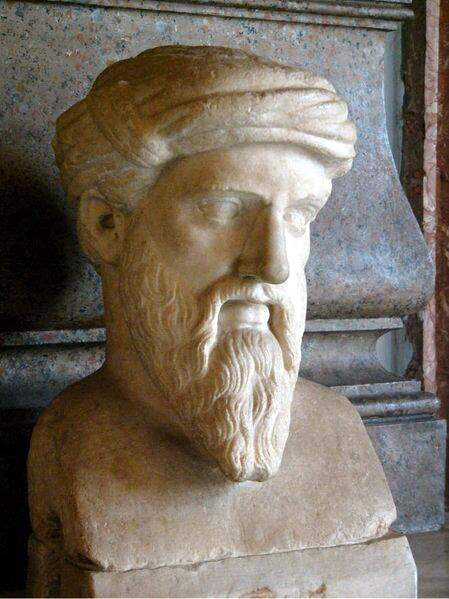
Kapitolinischer Pythagoras sculpture

Pythagoras (570 BC – 495 BC) was a Greek philosopher, mathematician, and is also considered to be "the Father of Ethical Vegetarianism". He believed that in order to obtain the highest level of spiritual and physical health it was necessary to follow a lifestyle that included a vegetarian diet which excluded meats and other flesh foods. Anaxagoras (500 BC – 428 BC) was also a Greek philosopher, he suggested that foods that we ate contained fragments that were needed for growth in the body. His belief was that "everything is in everything, at all times", physical characteristics (hair, nails, flesh, etc.) were generated from foods that contained those same substances. Hippocrates (460 BC – 377 BC) was a physician known as the "father of medicine", his nutritional advice was based on the presence of the four humors in the body. Plato (428/427 BC – 348/347 BC) was a Greek philosopher and mathematician; his idea of a healthy diet consisted of balance and moderation of cereals, fruits, vegetables, dairy, with a strong emphasis on the moderation of meat and wine. His belief is that excess food from one source would lead to future ailments. Galen (129 AD – 216 AD) built much of his work by challenging the writings of others. He was an admirer of Hippocrates because of the work he had done in the field of medicine. Galen believed that Hippocrates had stated all that needed to be known about nutrition, and he would interpret his work by the presentation of his own knowledge.

== Medicine ==
The humoral theory of medicine was central to medicine during antiquity and for centuries following. Physicians believed that the body contained a mixture of bodily fluids, the four humors: black bile, yellow bile, phlegm, and blood. They assessed a patient's degree of health based on the balance of these four bodily fluids. Diet was the first prescribed treatment of disease followed by drugs, then surgery. Early physicians studied the different ways foods would affect the humors of the body by restoring health or causing disease. Utilizing knowledge about how humors were affected by diet physicians prescribed diets with balance, moderation, and timing in mind. Galen worked extensively on classifying foods according to how they interacted with the humors of the body. Galen had also noted that some foods had drug characteristics and for that reason during food preparation it was not uncommon to boil those foods two or three times.

== See also ==
- Ancient Greek cuisine
- History of vegetarianism
- Food and diet in ancient medicine
