= Epaenetus =

Epaenetus is a name that comes from Ancient Greek, meaning 'praised', and may refer to:

- Epaenetus of Argos, winner of the boys' stadion race in the 80 BC Olympics
- Epenetus of Carthage (died 64 AD), a saint in the Greek Orthodox and Roman Catholic Churches
- Epaenetus (gourmet), an author of cookbooks and gastronomy.
- Epaenetus (633–632 BC), an Archon of Athens
- Epaenetus (2nd century BC), ambassador, with Apollodorus of Boeotia, from the Boeotians to the Messenians

== See also ==
- Papilio epenetus, a species of swallowtail butterfly
