= Condy =

Condy or Condie may refer to:

== Surname ==
- Gillian Condy (born 1952), South African botanical artist
- Henry Bollmann Condy, 19th century British chemist and industrialist
- Jack Condy (born 1994), Welsh rugby union player
- Jonathan Condy (1770–1828), American lawyer
- Nicholas Condy (1793–1857), English landscape painter
- Nicholas Matthews Condy (1816–1851), British maritime painter, son of Nicholas Condy
- Richard Condie (born 1942), Canadian animator, film maker and musician
- Richard P. Condie (1898–1985), conductor of the Mormon Tabernacle Choir from 1957 to 1974
- Spencer J. Condie (born 1940), general authority of The Church of Jesus Christ of Latter-day Saints

== Given name ==
- Condy Raguet (1784–1842), American politician and free trade advocate, first chargé d'affaires to Brazil
- Condy Dabney, American convicted of murdering a girl who was later found alive in 1927

== Other ==
- Condy (drinking vessel) (κόνδυ), an ancient drinking vessel
- Condie Nature Refuge, a park in Saskatchewan, Canada

== See also ==
- Condoleezza Rice (born 1954), informally shortened to Condie, former United States Secretary of State
- Natural-gas condensate, a low-density mixture of hydrocarbon liquids
