= Menecles =

Menecles may refer to:

- Menecles (bug), type of stink bug
- Menecles of Barca (2nd century BC), Greek historian
- Menecles of Alabanda (1st century BC), Greek rhetorician
- Menecles (philosopher) (1st century BC)
