= Hippolochus (writer) =

Hippolochus (Greek: Ἱππόλοχος) was a Macedonian writer, a student of Theophrastus, who addressed to his fellow-student Lynceus of Samos a description of a wedding feast in Macedon in the early 3rd century BC. The bridegroom was a certain Caranus, probably a relative of the Caranus who had been a companion of Alexander the Great. The letter survives because it is quoted at length by Athenaeus in the Deipnosophistae.
