= Swallow song of Rhodes =

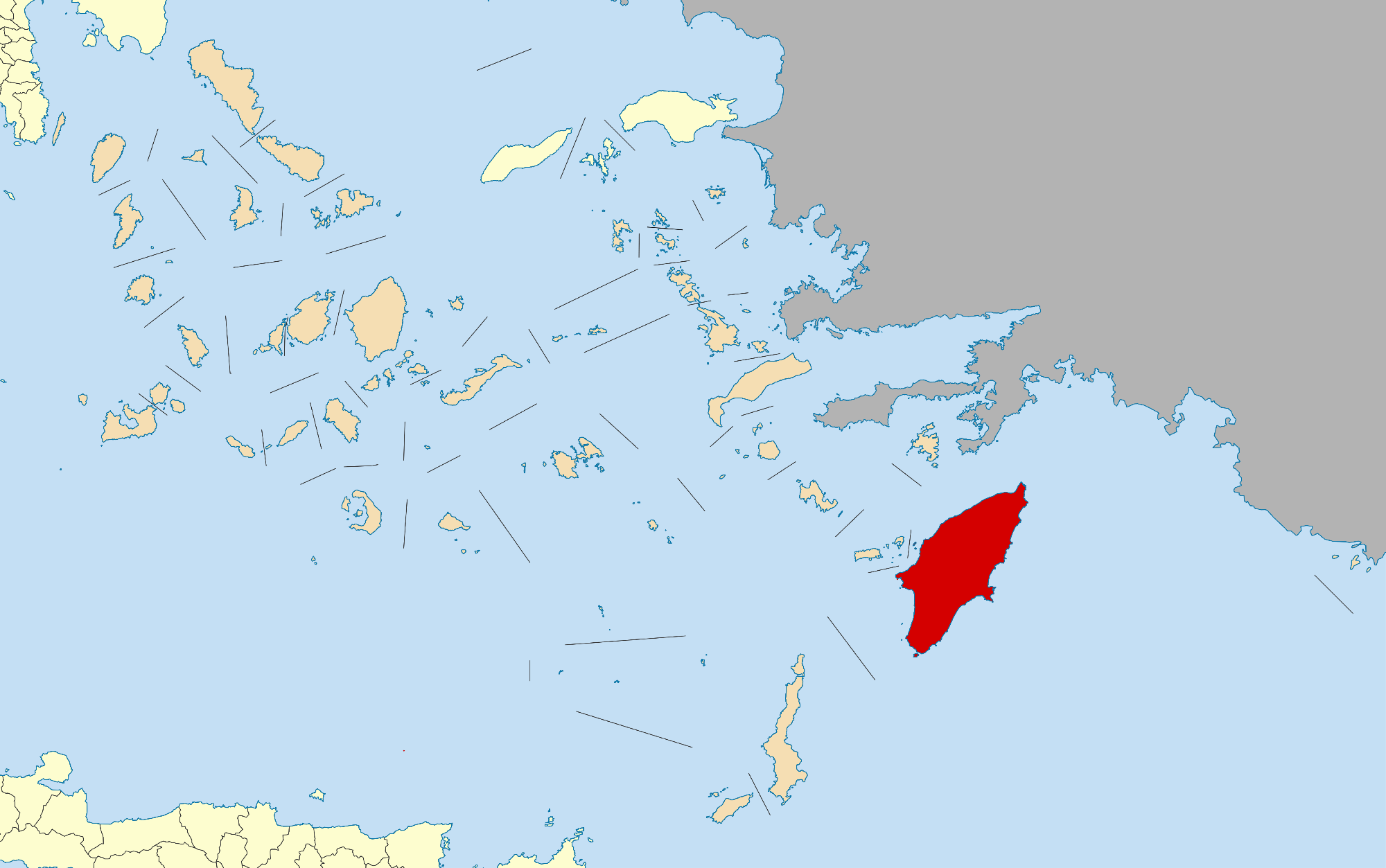
Map showing the location of the Greek island of Rhodes

The "Swallow Song of Rhodes" is a famous ancient Greek folk song. In a tradition closely resembling the modern custom of trick-or-treating, during the month of Boedromion, the children on the Greek island of Rhodes would go out dressed as swallows and beg from door to door, singing the song. The song is preserved by the ancient Greek writer, Athenaeus of Naucratis, in his book, The Deipnosophists. On the Attic calendar, the month of Boedromion took place in early autumn. It usually began around mid-September and ended sometime around mid-October. On the Rhodian calendar, however, the month seems to have taken place in early spring. The tradition was claimed to have been started by the Rhodian lawgiver Cleobulus.

The melody to the song has not survived. All that has survived of the song are the lyrics themselves. The full text of the song in Ancient Greek and in English translation is as follows:

Original Greek text ἦλθ’ ἦλθε χελιδὼν καλὰς ὥρας ἄγουσα, καλοὺς ἐνιαυτούς, ἐπὶ γαστέρα λευκά, ἐπὶ νῶτα μέλαινα. παλάθαν σὺ προκύκλει ἐκ πίονος οἴκου οἴνου τε δέπαστρον τυροῦ τε κάνυστρον καὶ πύρνα χελιδὼν καὶ τὰν λεκιθίταν οὐκ ἀπωθεῖται· πότερ’ ἀπίωμες ἢ λαβώμεθα; εἰ μέν τι δώσεις· εἰ δὲ μή, οὐκ ἐάσομες· ἢ τὰν θύραν φέρωμες ἢ τὸ ὑπέρθυρον ἢ τὰν γυναῖκα τὰν ἔσω καθημέναν· μικρὰ μέν ἐστι, ῥαιδίως νιν οἴσομες. ἂν δὴ φέρηις τι, μέγα δή τι φέροις· ἄνοιγ’ ἄνοιγε τὰν θύραν χελιδόνι· οὐ γὰρ γέροντές ἐσμεν, ἀλλὰ παιδία.	English translation by Pär Sandin Came, came the swallow with pleasant seasons, with the beautiful year. It is white underneath and black on the back. You, roll the fruitcake out of the rich mansion and a cup of wine, and a basket of cheese: nor wheat bread shall the swallow, nor pulse bread refuse. Now should we leave? or else receive? If so, then give, or else we’re not content We’ll take the door or the lintel above it or the woman, she who is sitting outside it, she’s small indeed, an easy load; if you will bring, bring something large: now open, open the door for the swallow, we are not old men, but only children.
