= Lynceus of Samos =

3rd-century BC Greek writer

Lynceus of Samos (Ancient Greek: Λυγκεὺς ὁ Σάμιος), brother of the historian Duris of Samos, was a classical Greek author of comedies, letters and humorous anecdotes. He lived in the late 4th and early 3rd centuries BC and was a pupil of Theophrastus. His works, especially his letters and the essay Shopping for Food, show a special interest in gastronomy. He was also the addressee of an important letter by Hippolochus on dining in Macedon. He would be practically unknown if it were not for numerous quotations from his works in the Deipnosophistae of Athenaeus.

As a comedy author Lynceus is classed among the writers of Athenian New Comedy, and the single surviving fragment from his play Kentauros ("The Centaur"), as quoted by Athenaeus (131f), appears in the standard collections of comic fragments. It is a scene set at Athens in which a dinner menu is discussed with reference to the guests' cities of origin and probable food preferences.

The only collection of the fragments from Lynceus's prose works is in Andrew Dalby's paper published in 2000.
