= Social dining =

Social dining (by a group of people) is meeting either at someone's place or at restaurant to enjoy a meal together. It is a philosophy of using meals specifically as a means to connect with others: eat to socialize.

A brunch, dinner or supper party are popular examples of places to socially gather over food.

Social dining differs from a dining club in the sense that it is not exclusive, but promotes an inclusive atmosphere. Friends and strangers alike can share the social dining experience.

== History ==
Social dining dates back to Ancient Greek cuisine when meals would be prepared for the purpose of gathering together during festivals or commemorations.

== Influence of Technology ==
Technology has made social dining a sharable experience through real-time updates, uploaded images and check-ins (at someone's place or at the restaurant). Some web-based services get people together to share a social meal, even to join local families for a social dining experience while travelling, to truly experience the local culture and culinary. There are also other social dining networks that let people do group meals at the homes of their users. Another way to experience social dining is by visiting a supper club.

Social dining experiences can also be a source of revenue for host that enable them through different kind of website, those can be associated to airbnb business model.
