= Epaenetus (gourmet) =

Ancient Greek author of cookbooks

Epaenetus (Ancient Greek: Επαίνετος) was an ancient Greek author of cookbooks and gastronomy. The era in which he lived remains unknown.

Athenaeus of Naucratis mentions him several times and refers to the titles of two of his works: On Fish and Opsartuticos (Οψαρτυτικός). The second was a cooking guide, from which the recipe for a rich dish called myma survived (in the 14th book of the Deipnosophists). It was made with finely chopped pieces of meat mixed with the innards and blood of the animal, to which vinegar, herbs, and spices, sautéed onion, and roasted cheese, honey, and sour pomegranate seeds were added.

== Bibliography ==
- Athenaeus, The Deipnosophists. C. D. Yonge, B.A., Ed. Perseus Digital Library. Link
- A Dictionary of Greek and Roman biography and mythology. Volume II. William Smith, Ed. Perseus Digital Library. Link
