= Menecles of Barca =

Menecles of Barca (Ancient Greek: Μενεκλῆς) was a Greek historian of the 2nd century BC. None of his works survives complete, but some are known from fragments. The only biographical information imparted by ancient authors is that he was from Barca in north Africa, as mentioned by Athenaios in Deipnosophists.

The historian from Barca is known to have written a History of Libya (Libykaí Historíai) in four books. Other works that are probably by the same Menecles are the ethnographic Synagōgḗ ('Compilation') and a Glossary (Glōssókomon) that gives definitions and etymologies of unusual words. A certain Menecles was the author, reviser or epitomator of the periegetic work On Athens (Perí Athēnṓn), but there is no consensus that this was the same person as the historian. Kai Brodersen considers it "doubtful whether [they are] identical", but Mary Frances Williams cautions that "it is wrong to disregard the known Menekles of Barka in favor of an unknown and postulated Menekles the Perieget".

There are all together 14 fragments that have at times been assigned to Menecles. Listed by conventional number, topic and source, they are:

- F1 – about the port of Piraeus, from a scholium on Aristophanes, Peace
- F2 – about a place in Athens called Hermai, from Harpocration's Lexicon of the Ten Orators
- F3 – about the Hekatompedon, from Harpocration's Lexicon of the Ten Orators
- F4a – about the Kerameikos, from a scholium on Aristophanes' Birds
- F4b – about the Kerameikos, from Harpocration's Lexicon of the Ten Orators
- F5 – about the fate of Queen Pheretima, from the Tractatus de mulieribus
- F6 – about King Battus I of Cyrene consulting the Oracle of Delphi, from a scholium on Pindar's Pythian Odes
- F7 – about the Pygmies, from Athenaios' Deipnosophists via Eustathius of Thessalonica's Commentary on the Iliad
- F8 – about the etymology of the word diakonion (διακόνιον), cited in the Suda
- F9 – about how the Alexandrians "were the teachers of all the Greeks and the barbarians at a time when the entire system of general education had broken down" during the Wars of the Diadochi and how they later suffered under Ptolemy VII, from Athenaios' Deipnosophists
- F10a – about Orestes consulting the Oracle of Delphi, from the Etymologicum Genuinum
- F10b – another about King Battus I of Cyrene consulting the Oracle of Delphi, from a scholium on Pindar's Pythian Odes
- F10c – about Eurypylus as king of Cyrene and Battus I as founder, from John Tzetzes's Commentary on Lycophron's Alexandra
- F11 – about Heracles supposed expedition to Troy, from a scholium on Homer's Iliad

F1–F4b are from On Athens and are attributed to Kallikrates or Menecles, one of whom was the author and the other a reviser or epitomator. It is not known which was which. Some have hypothesized an otherwise unknown writer, Menecles the Periegete, rather than identify this Menecles with the Libyan historian. On Athens was completed before Sulla's siege of Athens in 86 BC.

F5 is attributed to the Libyan History. F7 is from the Synagōgḗ. F8 is from the Glossary.
