= Bicos (vessel) =

Earthen vessel

Bicos (Ancient Greek: Βῖκος) was an earthen vessel used by the Greeks for holding wine and sometimes for storing salted meat or fish. Hesychius defines it as a stamnos with handles.
