= Charles Burton Gulick =

American classical philologist (1868–1962)

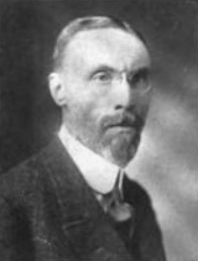
Charles Burton Gulick from The Book of the Class of 1914, Radcliffe College

Charles Burton Gulick (born September 30, 1868, in Jersey City, New Jersey; died May 23, 1962, in White Plains, New York) was an American classical philologist. He taught at Harvard University from 1892 to 1937.

== Biography ==
Charles Burton Gulick, son of traveling salesman Horace Gulick and his wife Anna Louise Sillcocks Gulick, studied classical philology at Harvard University. He earned his bachelor's degree in 1890 and his master's degree in 1891. In 1890, he was awarded a Bowdoin Prize for a translation into attic prose. Following this, he traveled to Germany and Greece for further study. Gulick spent his entire academic career at Harvard, starting as an instructor in Greek in 1892. In 1894, he earned his doctorate and was promoted to assistant professor. He became a full Professor of Greek in 1909 and was appointed Eliot Professor of Greek in 1925. Additionally, he served as a visiting professor at the American School of Classical Studies at Athens in 1911–1912, President of the Classical Association of New England in 1928–1929, and President of the American Philological Association in 1929–1930. Gulick retired in 1937 due to deteriorating eyesight, which forced him to give up his academic work.

Gulick was interested in various aspects of Greek culture. He wrote two books on the private life of the Greeks and a bilingual edition of Athenaeus' "Deipnosophistae" for the Loeb Classical Library in 1927. In 1930, Gulick edited a revised edition of William Watson Goodwin's Greek Grammar.

In 1913, he was elected to the American Academy of Arts and Sciences, and in 1940, to the American Philosophical Society.

== Selected works ==
- De scholiis Aristophaneis quaestiones mythicae. Dissertation, Harvard 1894. Published in: Harvard Studies in Classical Philology. Vol 5 (1894), S. 83–166 (public domain)
- The Life of the Ancient Greeks. New York 1902 (public domain)
- Modern Traits in Old Greek Life. Longmans, Green and Company. 1927. (public domain)
- Athenaeus. The Deipnosophists. 7 Vol, New York/London 1928 (Loeb Classical Library)

=== As editor ===
- Morris Hicky Morgan: Brief Notes on the Greek Lyric Poets. Cambridge 1903
- William Watson Goodwin: Greek Grammar. Boston 1930

== Literature ==
- Arthur F. Stocker: Gulick, Charles Burton. In: Ward W. Briggs (Hrsg.): Biographical Dictionary of North American Classicists. Westport, CT/London: Greenwood Press 1994, ISBN 978-0-313-24560-2, S. 239f.
