= Cymba (boat) =

Ancient Greek small boat

Cymba or Cumba (also Cymbe or Cumbe; Ancient Greek: κύμβη), from κύμβος meaning "a hollow", was a small boat, probably originally made from a hollowed-out tree trunk. It was commonly used on rivers and lakes, especially by fishermen. According to Pliny the Elder, the cymba was invented by the Phoenicians. It appears to have been much the same as the acatium (ἀκάτιον) and scapha (σκάφη).

Ancient poets, including Virgil, Horace and Propertius, refer to the cymba as the boat of Charon, the mythological ferryman of the dead.

The diminutive form cymbula was used for a small boat attached to larger vessels.

The ancient Greek drinking vessel cymbium (κυμβίον, κύμβος, κύμβη) derived its name from the boat.

Plants with names beginning with the prefixes "cymbi-" (such as Cymbidium, Cymbiferus/Cymbifera, Cymbifolius, Cymbiformis, Cymbispathus, Cymbispinus) or "cymbo-" (such as Cymbopogon) or "cymba-" (such as Cymbalaria) derived their names from the boat, due to parts of the plant being shaped like it.
