= Timachidas of Rhodes =

Timachidas of Rhodes (Greek: Τιμαχίδας ὁ Ῥόδιος) was an ancient Greek poet and grammarian from the island of Rhodes who lived in 2nd/1st century BC. He wrote a hexametric poem entitled Deipnon or "Dinner Party" in at least four books (Supplementum Hellenisticum 769–73 BC), a lexicographical work known as Glossai ("Glossary"), and commentaries on various authors and works (Aristophanes' Frogs, Euripides' Medea, Menander's Kolax, Eratosthenes' Hermes). He is often identified with the co-author of the so-called Lindian Chronicle, an inscription published in 99 BC containing a list of dedications to the temple of Athena on Lindos on the island of Rhodes. However, this identification is far from certain. The most recent edition of the fragments of Timachidas include 1 testimonium and 35 fragments, mostly derived from Athenaeus, the lexicographical tradition (Harpocration, Hesychius), and ancient scholia.
