= Condy (drinking vessel) =

Ancient Greek drinking vessel

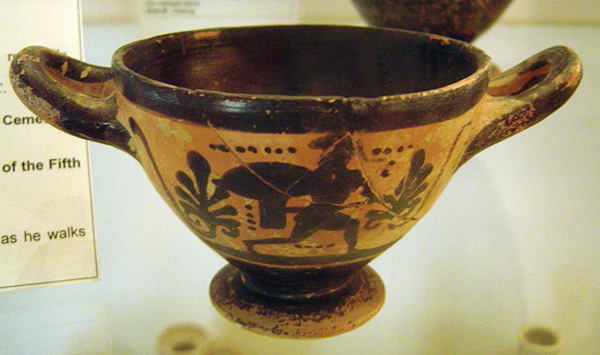
Attic skyphos depicting a hoplite, c. 490–480 BC

Condy (Ancient Greek: Κόνδυ) was a type of cup made of silver or gold (and like most Greek cup shapes, probably also in pottery). The actual shape of the type is unclear from the few literary references. Presumably it was used for drinking wine. Sometimes it was used by ancient Greeks and according to some authors its origin was Persian, while according to others Cappadocian. Menander, quoted by Athenaeus, speaks of a golden condy holding ten cotylae, probably equating to about five Imperial pints.

In the Book of Genesis the Hebrew word, which is translated scyphus (σκύφος) by Aquila and Vulgate, phiale (φιάλη) by Symmachus, is translated as κόνδυ in the old Alexandrine version, and the same word is used in Isaiah 51.17 and 22.
