= Deipnosophistae =

Work by Athenaeus

The Deipnosophistae
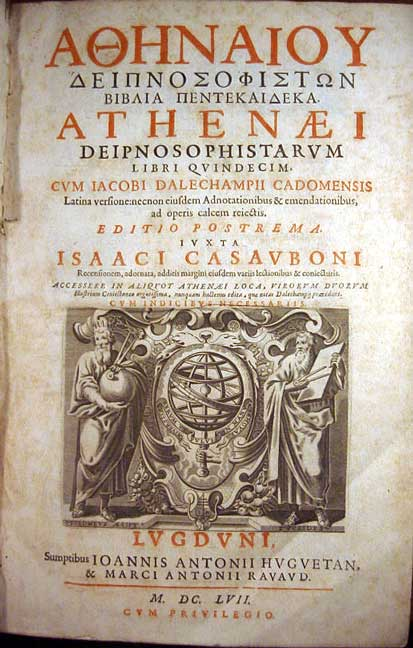
- Frontispiece to the 1657 edition of the Deipnosophists, edited by Isaac Casaubon, in Greek and Jacques Daléchamps' Latin translation
- Author: Athenaeus of Naucratis
- Original title: Δειπνοσοφισταί
- Language: Ancient Greek
- Subject: Literary, historical, and antiquarian references; food, wine, and culture
- Genre: Dialogue, symposium literature
- Set in: Rome
- Publication date: c. 200 AD

The Deipnosophistae (Ancient Greek: Δειπνοσοφισταί, Deipnosophistaí, lit. 'The Dinner Sophists', where sophists may be translated more loosely as 'sages, philosophers, experts') is a work written c. 200 AD in Ancient Greek by Athenaeus of Naucratis. It is a long work of literary, historical, and antiquarian references set in Rome at a series of banquets held by the protagonist Publius Livius Larensis for an assembly of grammarians, lexicographers, jurists, musicians, and hangers-on.

== Title ==
The Greek title Deipnosophistaí (Δειπνοσοφισταί) is a compound of deîpnon (δεῖπνον 'dinner') and sophistḗs (σοφιστής 'expert'). It and its English derivative deipnosophists thus describe people who are skilled at dining, particularly the refined conversation expected to accompany Greek symposia. However, the term is shaded by the harsh treatment accorded to professional teachers in Plato's Socratic dialogues, which made the English term sophist into a pejorative.

In English, Athenaeus's work usually known by its Latin form Deipnosophistae but is also variously translated as The Deipnosophists, Sophists at Dinner, The Learned Banqueters, The Banquet of the Learned, Philosophers at Dinner, or The Gastronomers.

== Contents ==
The Deipnosophistae professes to be an account, given by Athenaeus to his friend Timocrates, of a series of banquets held at the house of Larensius, a scholar and wealthy patron of the arts. It is thus a dialogue within a dialogue, after the manner of Plato, although each conversation is so long that, realistically, it would occupy several days. Among the numerous guests, Masurius, Zoilus, Democritus, Galen, Ulpian and Plutarch are named, but most are probably to be taken as fictitious personages, and the majority take little or no part in the conversation. If Ulpian is identical with the famous jurist, the Deipnosophistae must have been written after his death in 223; but the jurist was murdered by the Praetorian Guard, whereas Ulpian in Athenaeus dies a natural death. Prosopographical investigation, however, has shown the possibility of identifying several guests with real persons from other sources; the Ulpian in the dialog has also been linked to the renowned jurist's father.

The work is invaluable for providing fictionalized information about the Hellenistic literary world of the leisured class during the Roman Empire. To the majority of modern readers, even more useful is the wealth of information provided in the Deipnosophistae about earlier Greek literature. In the course of discussing classic authors, the participants make quotations, long and short, from the works of about 700 earlier Greek authors and 2,500 separate writings, many of them otherwise unrecorded (such as the swallow song of Rhodes). Food and wine, luxury, music, sexual mores, literary gossip and philology are among the major topics of discussion, and the stories behind many artworks such as the Venus Kallipygos are also transmitted in its pages.

=== Characters ===
In addition to the narrator Athenaeus, the Deipnosophistae includes several characters. This includes Aemilian of Mauretania, Alcides of Alexandria, Amoebeus, Arrian, Cynulcus, Daphnus of Ephesus, Democritus of Nicomedia, Dionysocles, Galen of Pergamum, Larensius, Leonides of Elis, Magnus, Masurius, Myrtilus of Thessaly, Palamedes the Eleatic, Philadelphus of Ptolemais, Plutarch of Alexandria, Pontian of Nicomedia, Rufinus of Nicaea, Ulpian of Tyre, Varus, and Zoilus.

=== Food and cookery ===
A 1535 edition

The Deipnosophistae is an important source of recipes in classical Greek. It quotes the original text of one recipe from the lost cookbook by Mithaecus, the oldest in Greek and the oldest recipe by a named author in any language. Other authors quoted for their recipes include Glaucus of Locri, Dionysius, Epaenetus, Hegesippus of Tarentum, Erasistratus, Diocles of Carystus, Timachidas of Rhodes, Philistion of Locri, Euthydemus of Athens, Chrysippus of Tyana, Paxamus and Harpocration of Mende. It also describes in detail the meal and festivities at the wedding feast of Caranos.

=== Drink ===
In expounding on earlier works, Athenaeus wrote that Aeschylus "very improperly" introduces the Greeks to be "so drunk as to break their vessels about one another's heads":

This is the man who threw so well
The vessel with an evil smell
And miss'd me not, but dash'd to shivers
The pot too full of steaming rivers
Against my head, which now, alas! sir,
Gives other smells besides macassar.

=== First patents ===
Athenaeus described what may be considered the first patents (i.e. exclusive right granted by a government to an inventor to practice his/her invention in exchange for disclosure of the invention). He mentions that several centuries BC, in the Greek city of Sybaris (located in what is now southern Italy), there were annual culinary competitions. The victor was given the exclusive right to prepare his dish for one year. Such a thing would have been unusual at the time because Greek society at large did not recognize exclusivity in inventions or ideas.

== Survival and reception ==
The Deipnosophistae was originally in fifteen books. The work survives in one manuscript from which the whole of books 1 and 2, and some other pages too, disappeared long ago. An Epitome or abridgment (to about 60%) was made in medieval times, and survives complete: from this it is possible to read the missing sections, though in a disjointed form.

The English polymath Sir Thomas Browne noted in his encyclopaedia Pseudodoxia Epidemica:

Athenæus, a delectable Author, very various, and justly stiled by Casaubon, Græcorum Plinius. There is extant of his, a famous Piece, under the name of Deipnosophista, or Coena Sapientum, containing the Discourse of many learned men, at a Feast provided by Laurentius. It is a laborious Collection out of many Authors, and some whereof are mentioned no where else. It containeth strange and singular relations, not without some spice or sprinkling of all Learning. The Author was probably a better Grammarian then Philosopher, dealing but hardly with Aristotle and Plato, and betrayeth himself much in his Chapter De Curiositate Aristotelis. In brief, he is an Author of excellent use, and may with discretion be read unto great advantage: and hath therefore well deserved the Comments of Casaubon and Dalecampius.

Browne's interest in Athenaeus reflects a revived interest in the Banquet of the Learned amongst scholars following the publication of the Deipnosophistae in 1612 by the Classical scholar Isaac Casaubon. Browne was also the author of a Latin essay on Athenaeus. By the nineteenth century however, the poet James Russell Lowell in 1867 characterized the Deipnosophistae and its author thus:

the somewhat greasy heap of a literary rag-and-bone-picker like Athenaeus is turned to gold by time.

Modern readers question whether the Deipnosophistae genuinely evokes a literary symposium of learned disquisitions on a range of subjects suitable for such an occasion, or whether it has a satirical edge, rehashing the cultural clichés of the urbane literati of its day.

=== Modern editions ===
The first critical edition in accordance to the principles of classical philology was published by German scholar Georg Kaibel in 1887–1890 in the Bibliotheca Teubneriana; this three-volume set remained the authoritative text for about 120 years and the only complete critical text. American philologist Charles Burton Gulick translated the entire text into English for the Loeb Classical Library.

In 2001, a team of Italian classical scholars led by Luciano Canfora (then Professor of Classical Philology, now Emeritus, University of Bari) published the first complete Italian translation of the Deipnosophistae, in a luxury edition with extensive introduction and commentary. A digital edition of Kaibel's text, with search tools and cross-references between Kaibel's and Casaubon's texts and digitalized indexes and Dialogi Personae, was put online by Italian philologist Monica Berti and her team, currently working at the Alexander von Humboldt University. In 2001, Eleonora Cavallini (Professor of Greek, University of Bologna) published a translation and commentary on Book 13. In 2010, Gabriele Burzacchini (Professor of Greek, University of Parma) published a translation and commentary of Book 1 found among the unpublished studies of the late Enzo Degani (formerly Professor of Greek in the University of Bologna); Burzacchini himself translated and commented Book 5 in more recent years.

In 2006, American classical philologist S. D. Olson renewed Loeb text thanks to a new collation of the manuscripts and the progression of critical studies on Athenaeus and newly translated and commented the whole work; in 2019, the same started a new critical edition for the Bibliotheca Teubneriana inclusive of the Epitome, also edited in parallel volumes.

== See also ==
- Characters of the Deipnosophistae

== Bibliography ==
Restorations and translations

- Athenaeus (1927–1941). Gulick, Charles Burton (ed.). Deipnosophistae. Loeb Classical Library (in Ancient Greek). Heinemann & Harvard University Press. 15 books in 7 vols. LCCN 28004492. OCLC 688821.
- Athenaeus (1887–1892). Kaibel, Georg (ed.). Athenaei Naucratitae Dipnosophistarum libri XV. Bibliotheca Teubneriana (in Ancient Greek). Leipzig: B.G. Teubner. 15 books in 3 vols. LCCN 34010800. OCLC 3288753.
- Athenaeus (1936–1939). Peppink, Simon Peter (ed.). Athenaei 'Dipnosophistarum' Epitome. Leiden: Brill Publishers. LCCN ac37000062. OCLC 890483. E. Harrison in The Classical Review: "Peppink regards EC as representing a better manuscript than A, on which the full texts of Kaibel and Gulick are based...."
- Athenaeus (1854). The Deipnosophists. Bohn's Classical Library. Translated by Yonge, Charles Duke. London: Henry G. Bohn. 15 books in 8 vols. LCCN 2002554451. OCLC 49415755.
- Athenaeus (2007–2012). Olson, S Douglas (ed.). The Learned Banqueters. Loeb Classical Library. Harvard University Press. 15 books in 8 vols: Olson ed. & trans. ISBN 978-0-674-99620-5.
