= List of yogurt-based dishes and beverages =

This is a list of yogurt-based dishes and beverages. Yogurt is a food produced by bacterial fermentation of milk. The bacteria used to make yogurt are known as "yogurt cultures". Fermentation of lactose by these bacteria produces lactic acid, which acts on milk protein to give yogurt its texture and its characteristic tang. Worldwide, cow's milk, the protein of which is mainly casein, is most commonly used to make yogurt. Milk from water buffalo, goats, ewes, mares, camels, and yaks is also used to produce yogurt in various parts of the world.

== Dishes ==
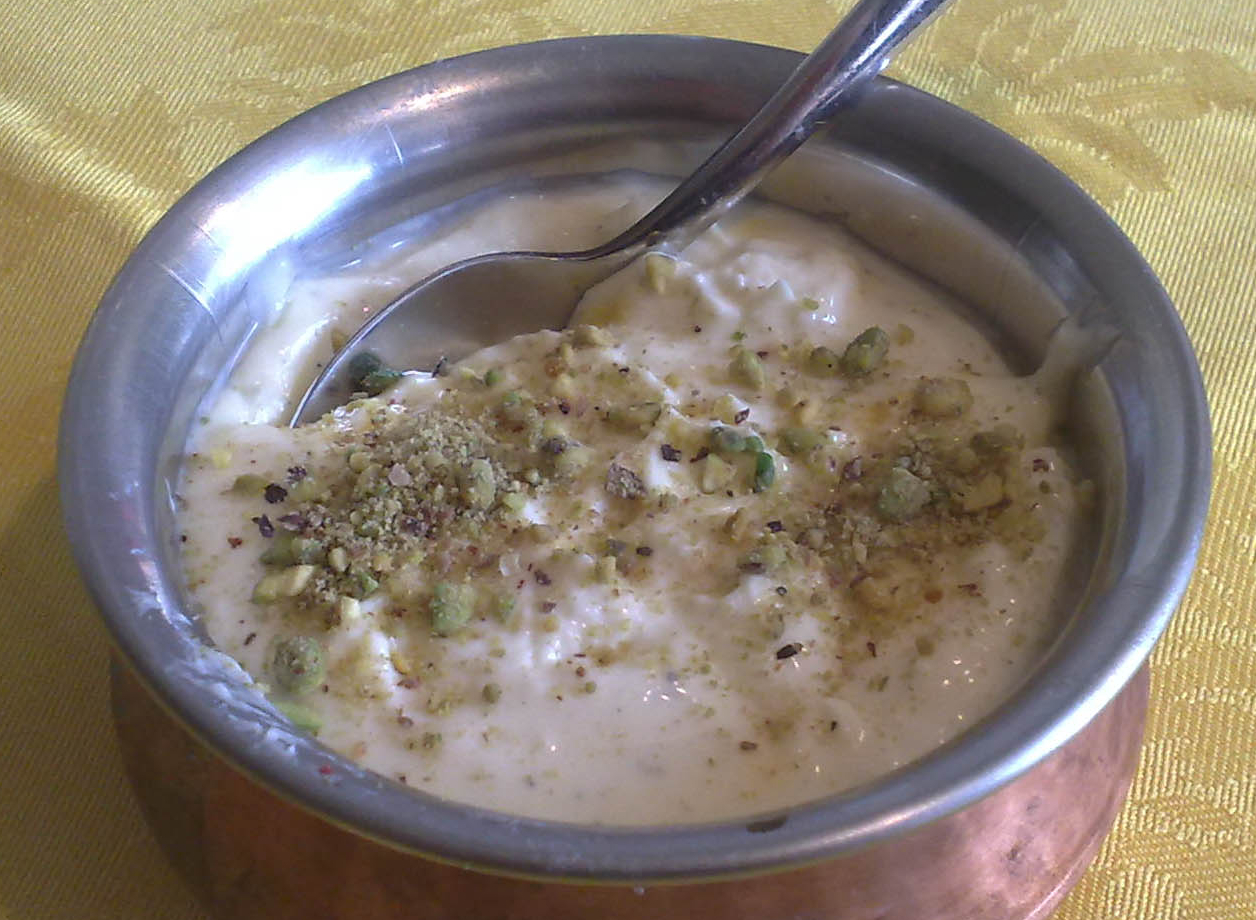
Shrikhand

- Churri – a spicy Indian side dish
- Çılbır – Turkish egg dish
- Haydari – Turkish dish containing garlic
- Jameed – Jordanian yogurt strained cheese
- Mansaf - Levantine dish of meat cooked in yogurt
- Kashk – Sour dairy product, popular in Central Asia and Northern Middle East
- Kibbeh – Arab and Levantine dish of ground meat and bulgur Labanie
- Mishti Doi – Dessert of Bengal
- Shrikhand – Indian food made from strained yogurt
- Tavë kosi – Albanian baked mutton and yougurt dish
- Zhoixo – Wild ginseng, made with yogurt

== Soups ==
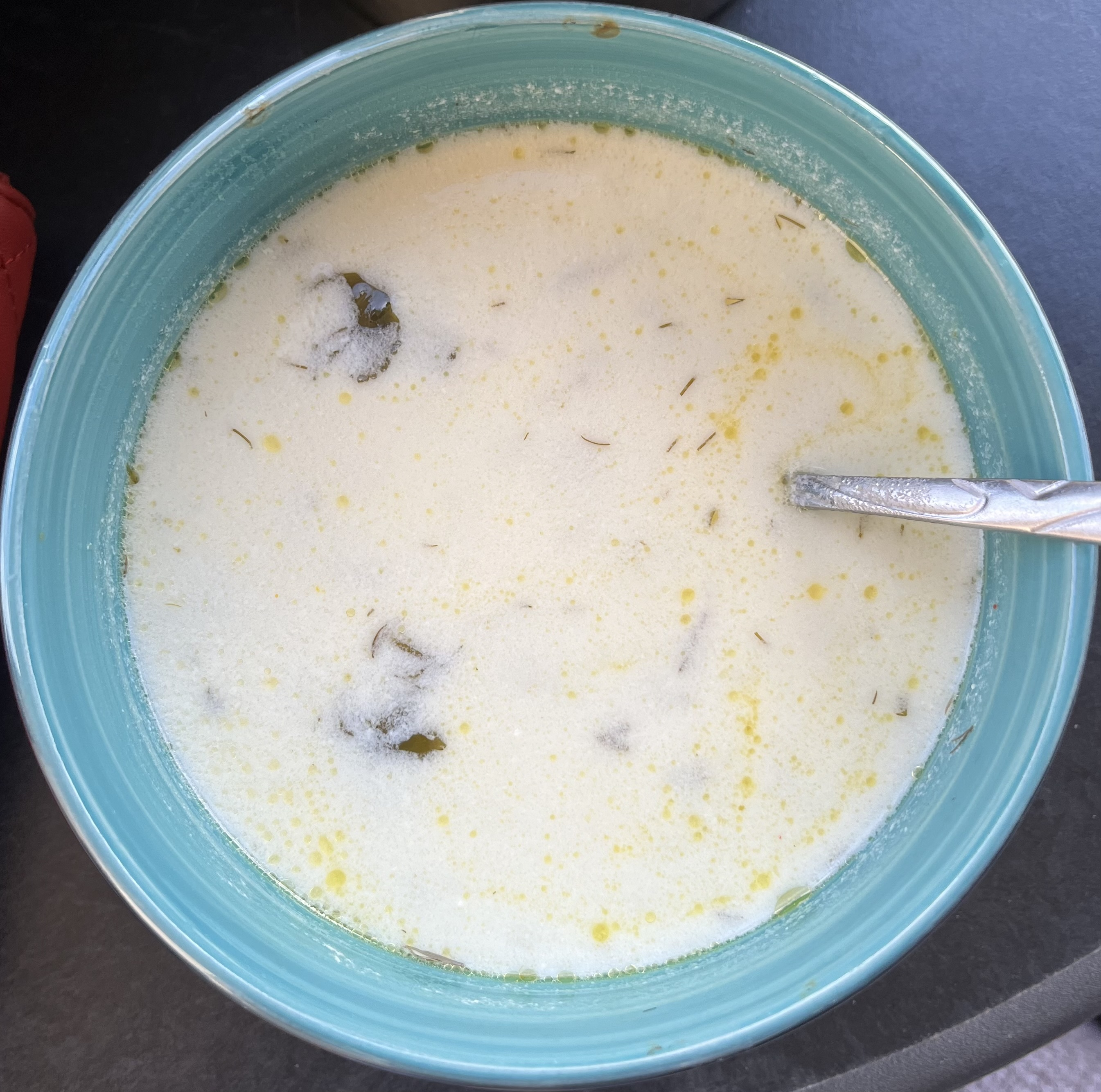
Spas is an Armenian matzoon soup made with wheat berrys and a variety of herbs.

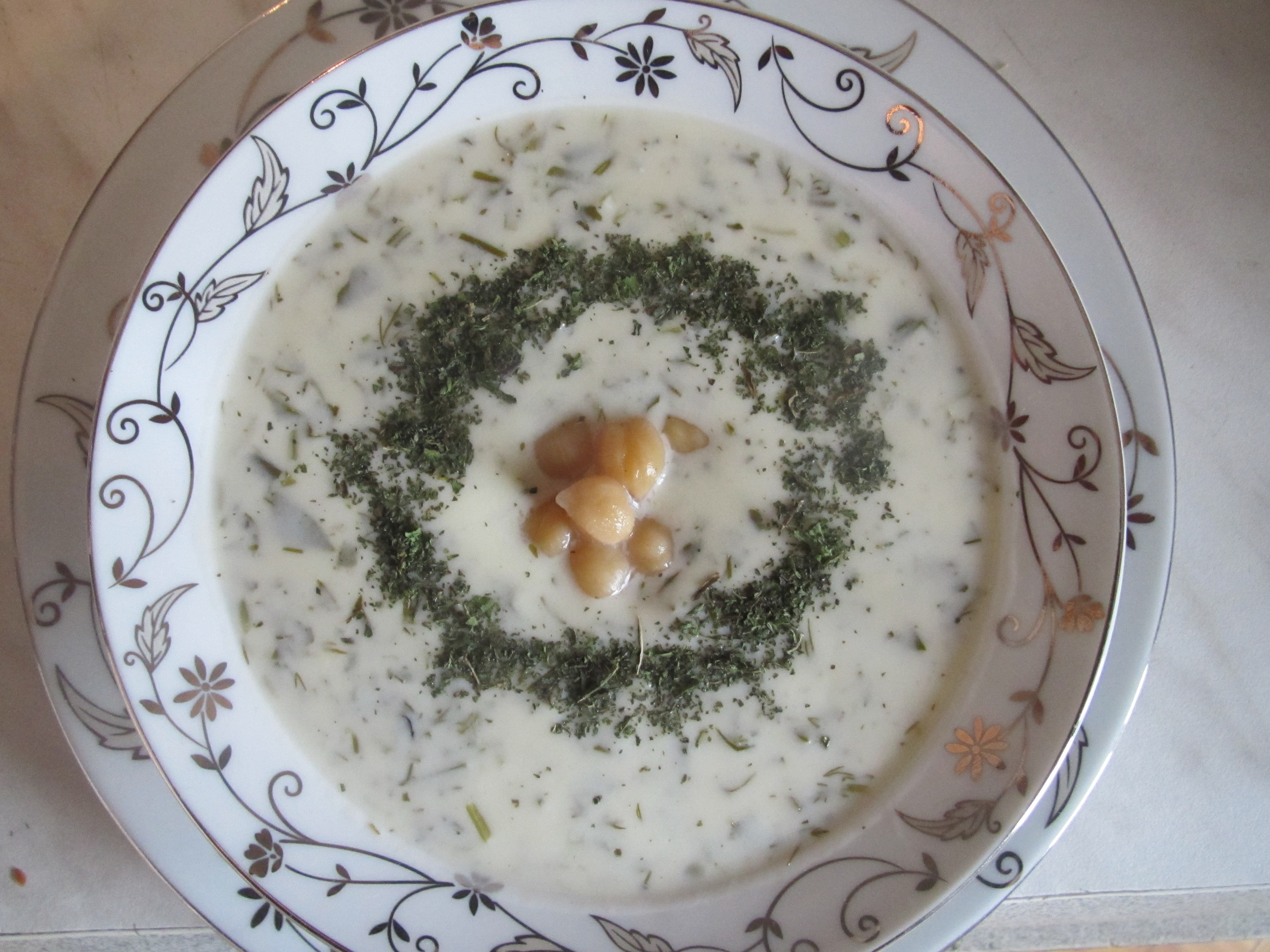
Dovga is an Azerbaijani yogurt soup cooked with a variety of herbs.

- Ash-e doogh – Iranian thick yogurt soup
- Spas – Armenian matzoon soup
- Dovga – Azerbaijani yogurt soup
- Tarator – Bulgarian cold yogurt soup with cucumbers and garlic
- Toyga soup – Turkish yogurt soup
- Shakriya – Levantine stew with lamb or beef traditional for Ramadan.
- Yayla çorbası – Turkish yogurt soup
- Okroshka – Russian soup sometimes based on kefir
- Cold beet soup – Soup traditional in Eastern Europe
- Tarhana soup – Cypriot soup made of sun-dried dough of cracked wheat and yogurt (also found in other Southeast European and Asian countries).

== Condiments ==
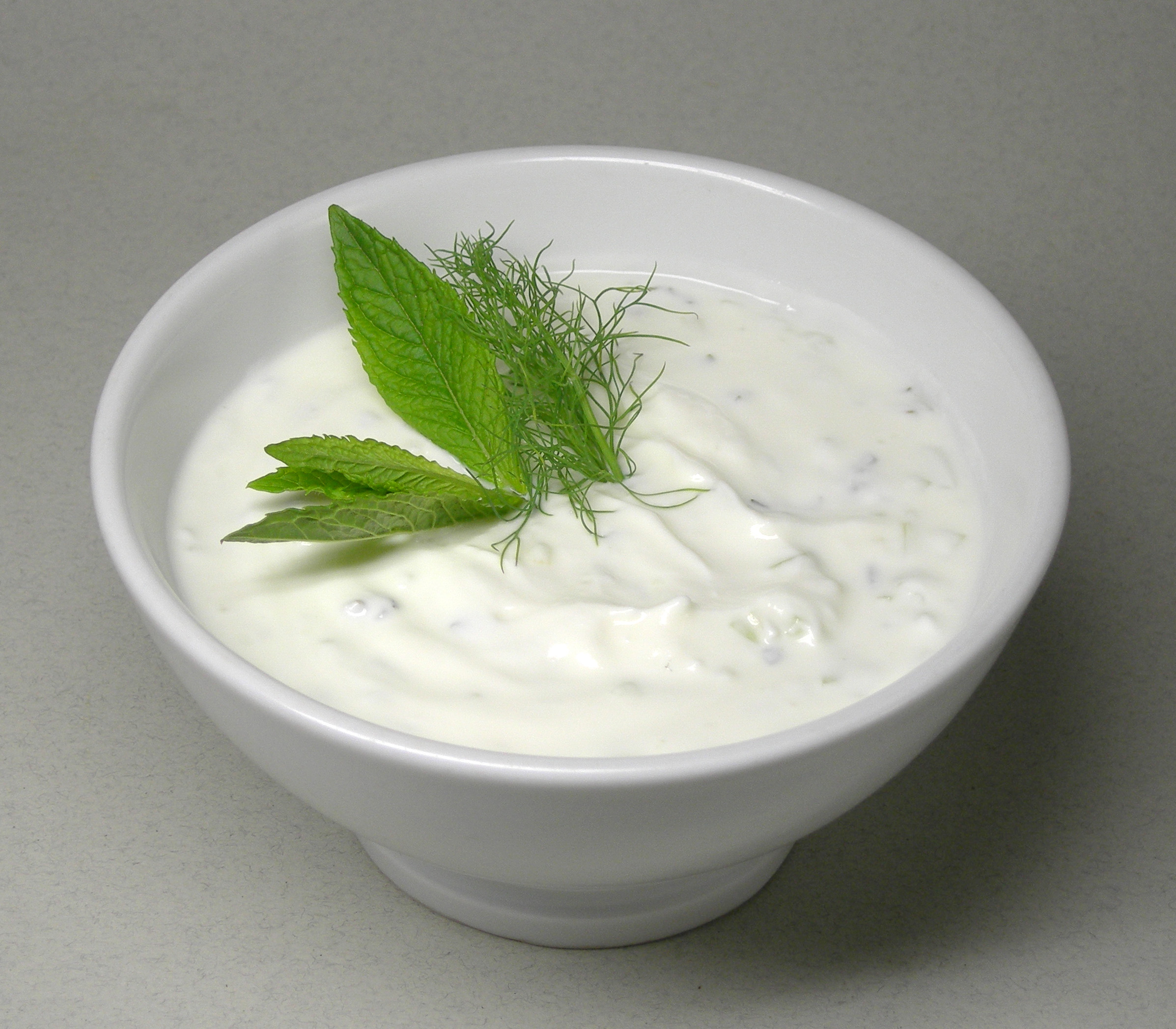
Tzatziki

- Dahi chutney
- Greek yogurt or Labneh – strained yogurt
- Perugu Pachadi
- Raita – Indian, Pakistani and Bangladeshi yogurt side dish that can be sweet or savory
- Tzatziki – yogurt dip

== Beverages ==
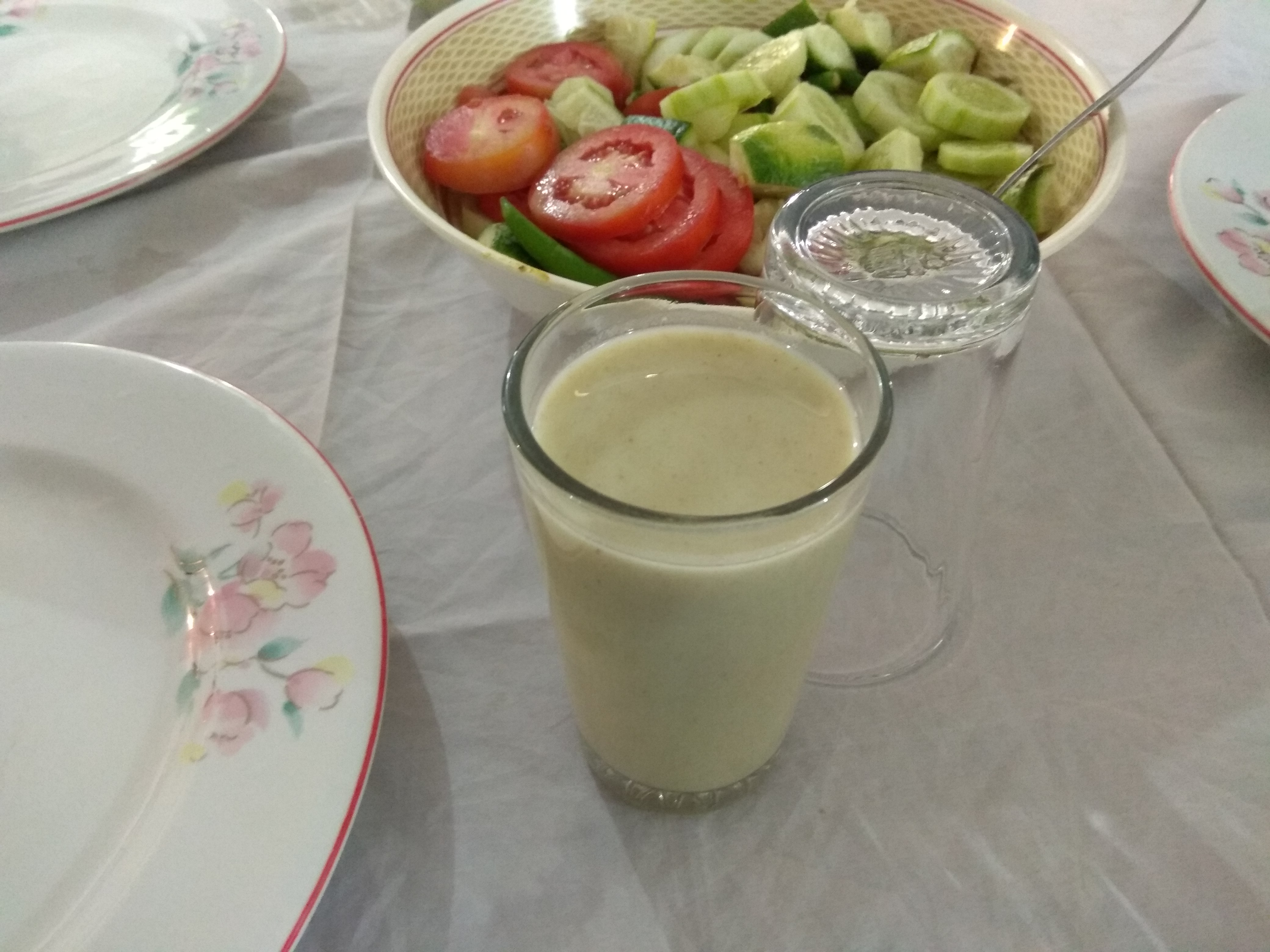
A glass of Borhani at a Bangladeshi wedding

- Acidophiline – Type of drinkable yogurt
- Ayran – Yogurt-based, salted drink, cold yogurt beverage of Turkic origin
- Borhani – Bangladeshi drinks – Bangladeshi curd drink mixed with coriander, mustard seeds, mint and other spices
- Chaas – Yogurt-based drink from South Asia
- Chal – Fermented camel milk drink of Central Asia
- Dhallë – Yogurt-based, salted drink, thinned in water, from Albania
- Doogh – Iranian fermented milk drink, Iranian cold yogurt beverage, sometimes with mint or sparkling water
- Isgelen tarag – Mongolian yogurt drink
- Lassi – Yogurt-based drink from the Indian subcontinent, Indian thick, cold yogurt beverage, can be savory or sweet or mixed with fruit
- Leben – Food or beverage of fermented milk
- Mattha – Dairy beverage
- Mursik – Fermented milk product
- Tan – Armenian cold yogurt beverage
- Nai lao – Chinese fermented milk drink
- Omaere – Namibian fermented dairy product
- Qatiq – Turkic fermented milk product
- Ryazhenka – Fermented dairy beverage
- Stewler – Russian fermented dairy product
- Yakult – Sweetened probiotic milk beverage

== Gallery ==
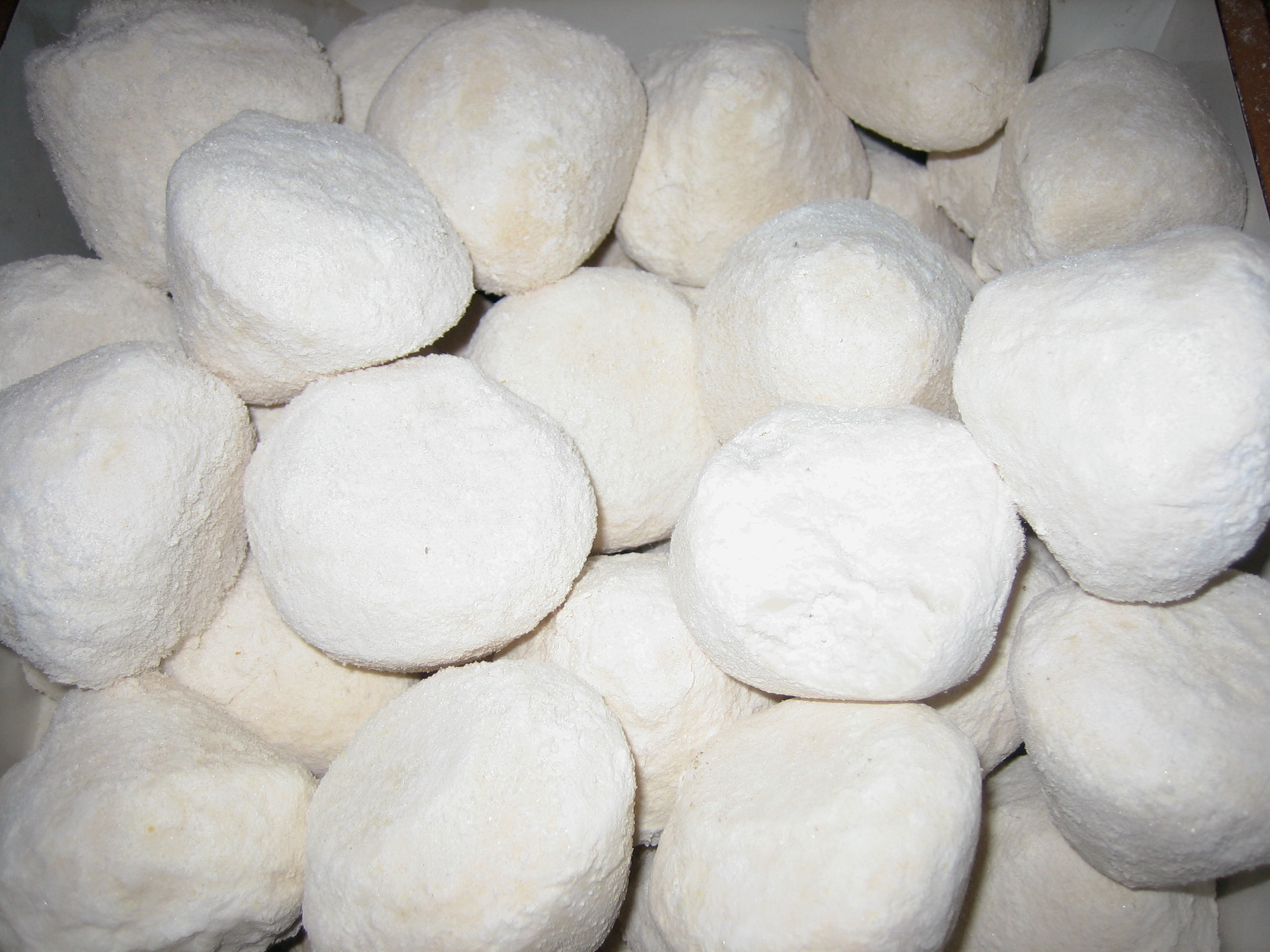
Jameed

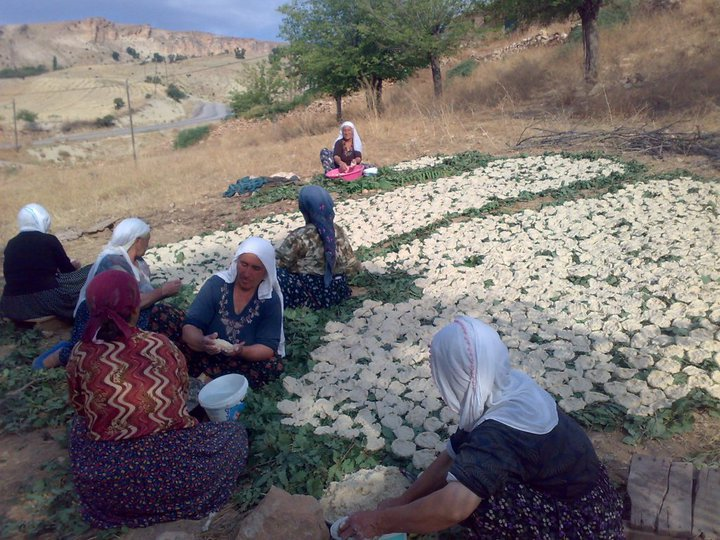
Kurdish women preparing kashk in a village at Turkey

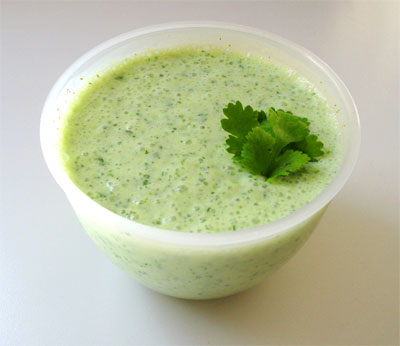
Raita with cucumber and mint

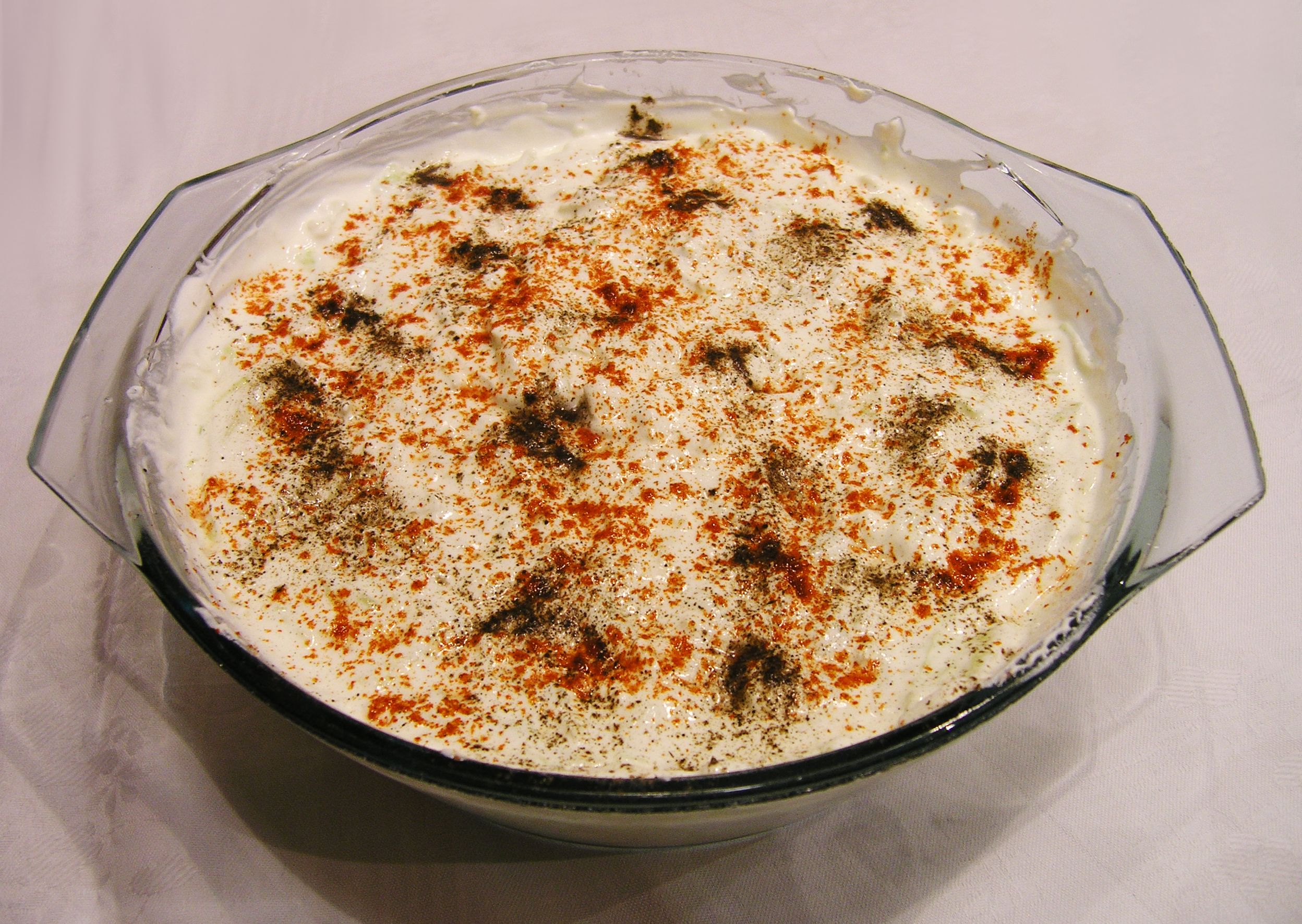
Tzatziki

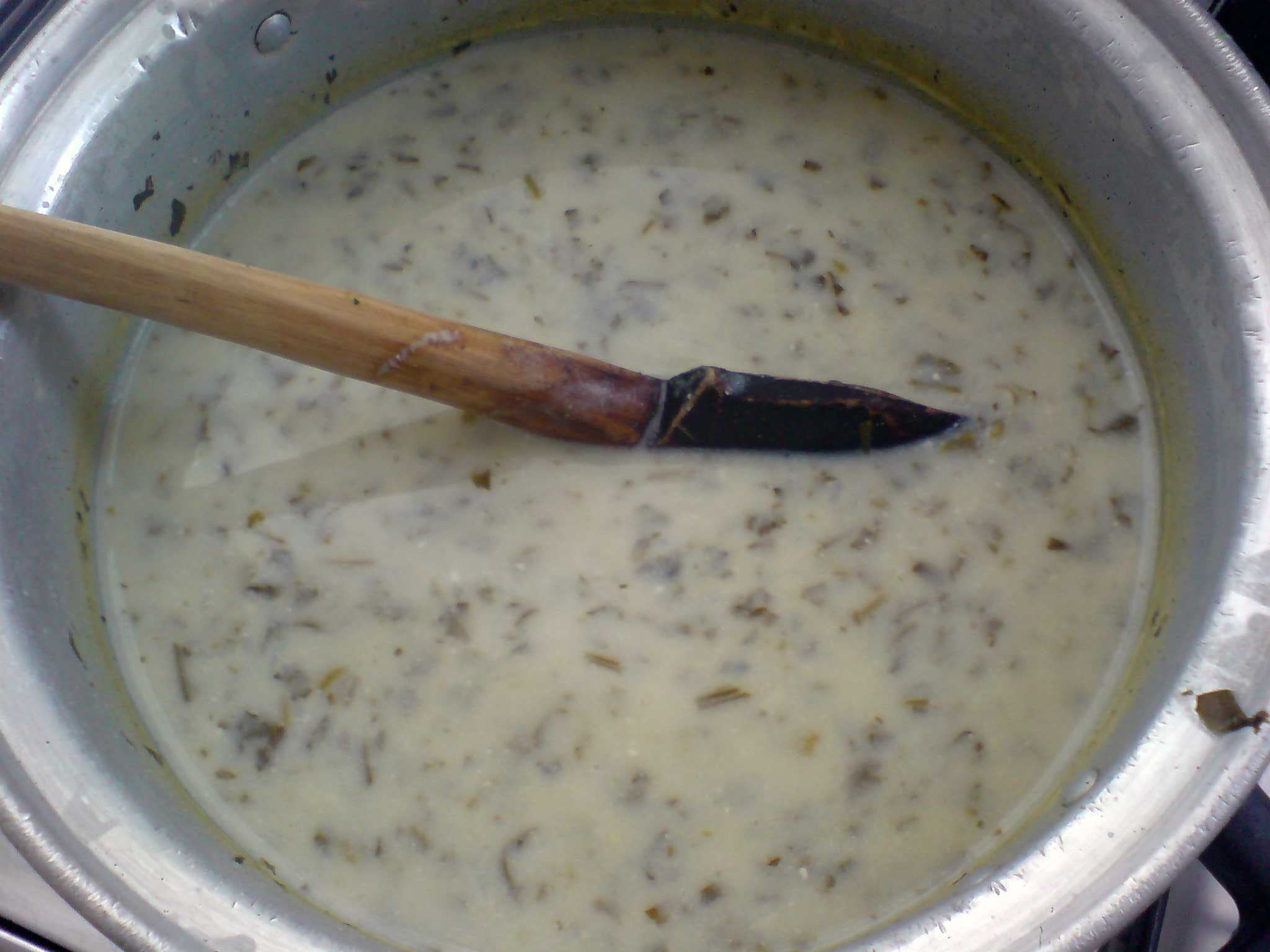
Ash-e doogh

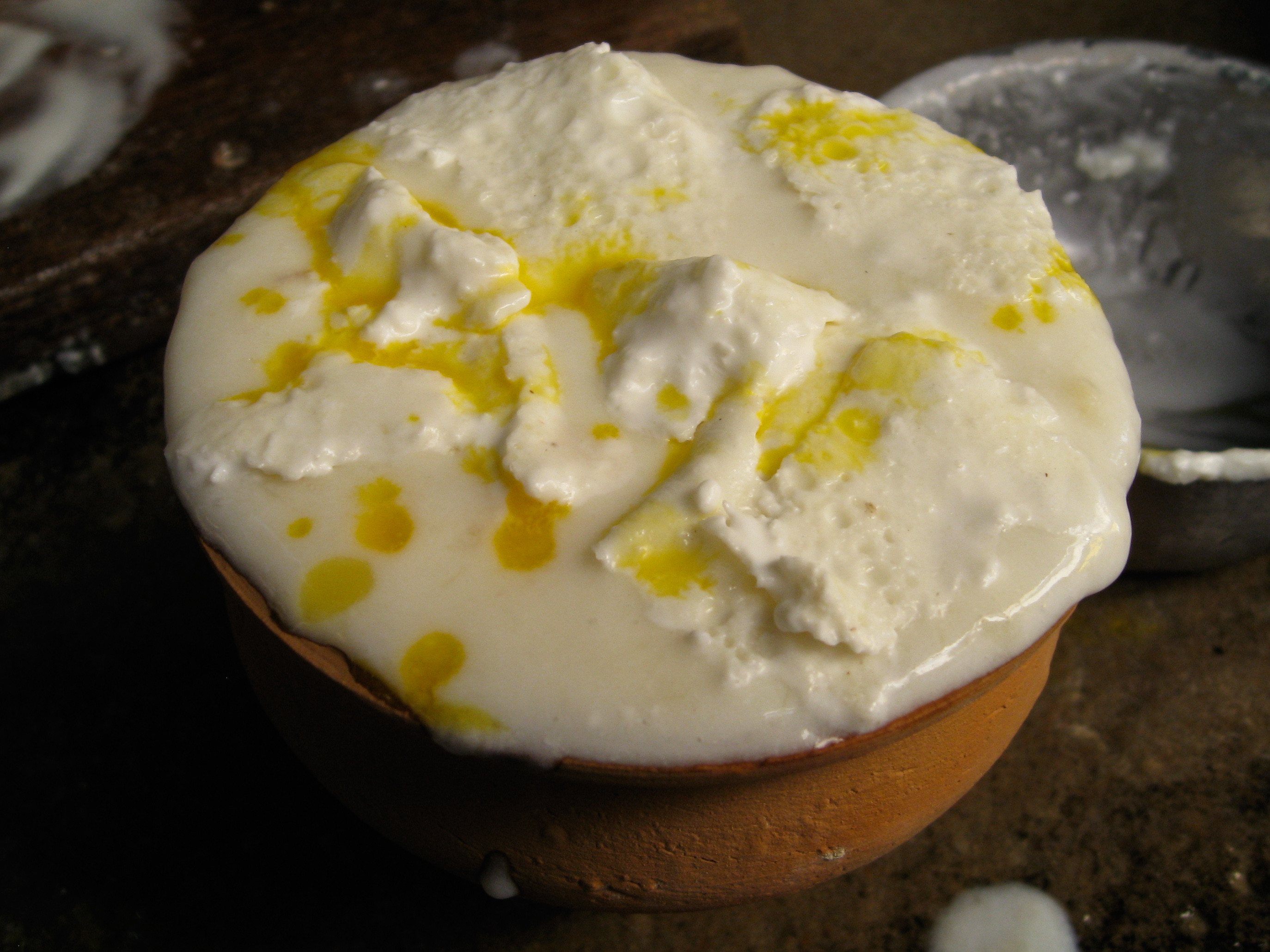
Lassi in an earthenware drinking vessel

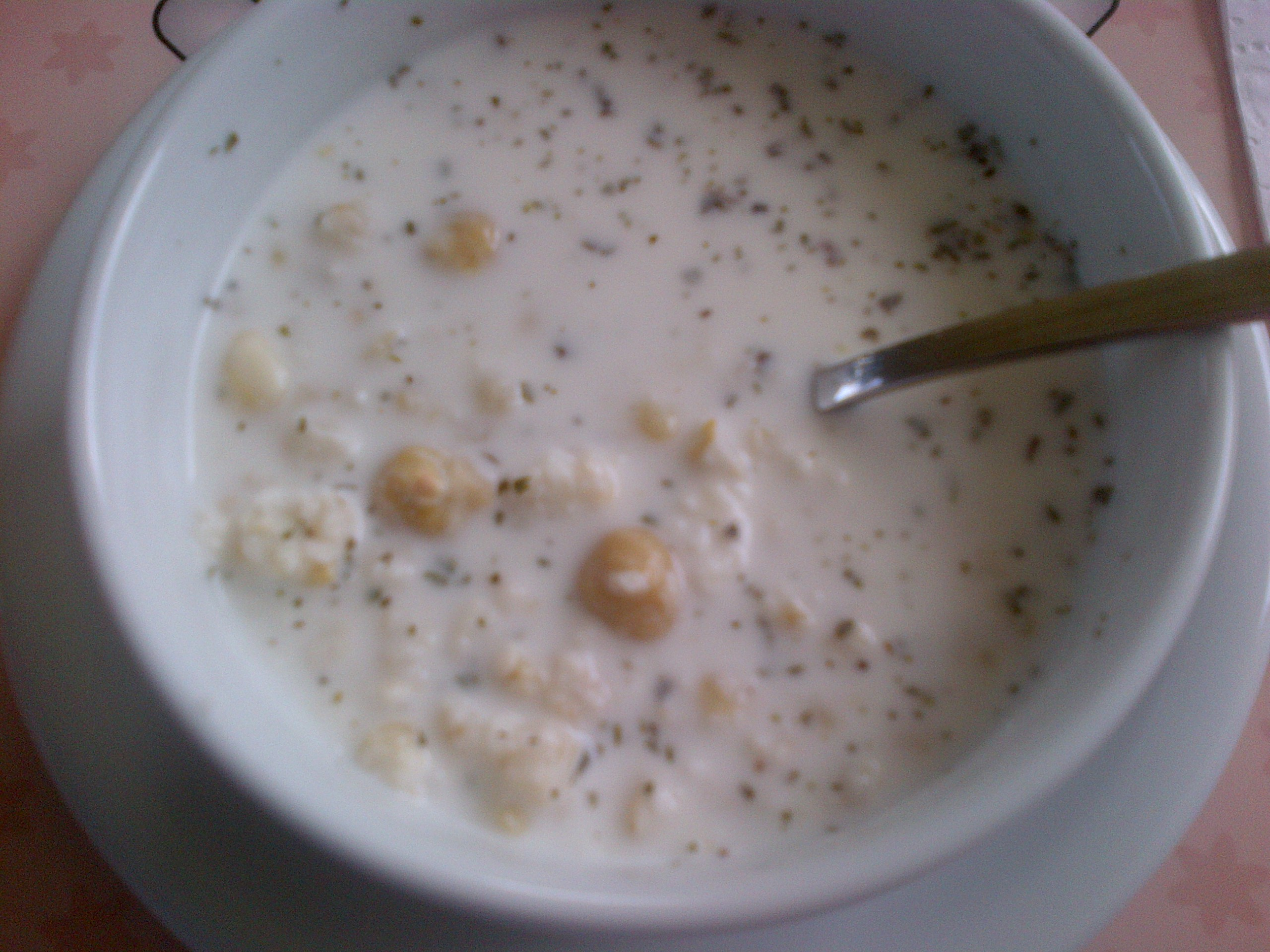
Toyga soup

== See also ==
- Fermented milk products
- List of dairy products
- List of fermented foods
- Lists of prepared foods
