= Leben (milk product) =

Food or beverage of fermented milk

Laban
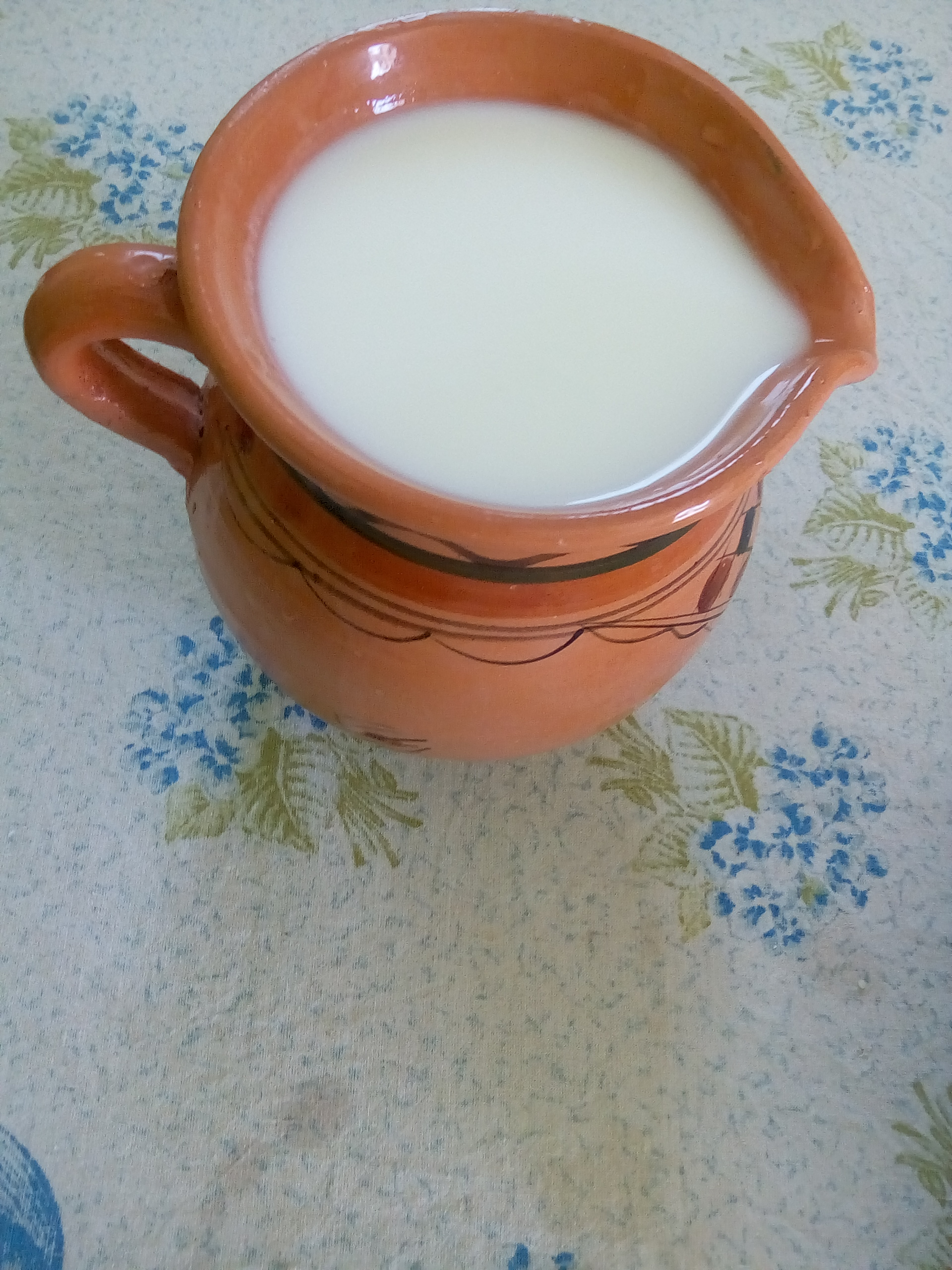
- A jar of leben
- Course: Breakfast, lunch
- Region or state: Middle East, Northern Africa
- Serving temperature: Cold
- Main ingredients: Milk, yogurt, half-and-half

The term leben, variously laban, liben, lben // (Arabic: لبن) in the Middle East and North Africa, refers to a food or beverage of fermented milk. Generally, there are two main products known as laban: the yogurt variant for the Levant region and the buttermilk variant for parts of Arabia and North Africa (Maghreb). Leben can be served at breakfast, lunch, or dinner.

Average nutritional values per 100 ml of laban:

- Energy: 60 kcal
- Protein: 3 g
- Carbohydrates: 4.7 g
  - Of which sugars: 4.7 g
- Total fat: 3.3 g
  - Of which saturated fat: 2.2 g
- Sodium: 45 mg
- Vitamin D3: 40 IU
- Vitamin A: 125 IU
- Calcium: 100 mg

== Buttermilk variant ==
Leben as a drink is traditionally prepared by letting milk ferment for around 24 hours, then churning and removing the butter. The remaining buttermilk can keep for several days at room temperature. In modern times, it is produced industrially.

== Yogurt variant ==
Leben in parts of the Middle East is traditionally prepared by boiling milk, usually whole milk, then adding yogurt (or previously made, leftover/store-bought leben), and then cooled overnight.

=== In Israel ===
In the early 20th century, small dairies run by Ashkenazi Jews in what was then Ottoman Palestine began producing the yogurt variant in quantity. It was called leben, from the Arabic, meaning "white", cognate to the Hebrew "לָבָן" (lavan). Leben was of extremely high importance to Jews during the British Mandate years, and was considered a dietary staple. During the tzena (austerity) period that followed the 1948 Arab–Israeli War, leben qualified for the state rationing system and was issued as a basic staple dairy product. Due to its importance during tzena, leben became indelibly ingrained in Israeli culture. In the 1970s, strawberry and chocolate flavours of leben appeared on store shelves, but these have largely been supplanted by fruit-flavoured yogurts.

== See also ==
- List of yogurt-based dishes and beverages
- Yogurt

Similar beverages:

- Ayran
- Cacık
- Chaas
- Chal
- Chalap
- Doogh
- Filmjölk
- Kefir
- Kumis
- Lassi
- Skyr
