= Mattha =

Dairy beverage

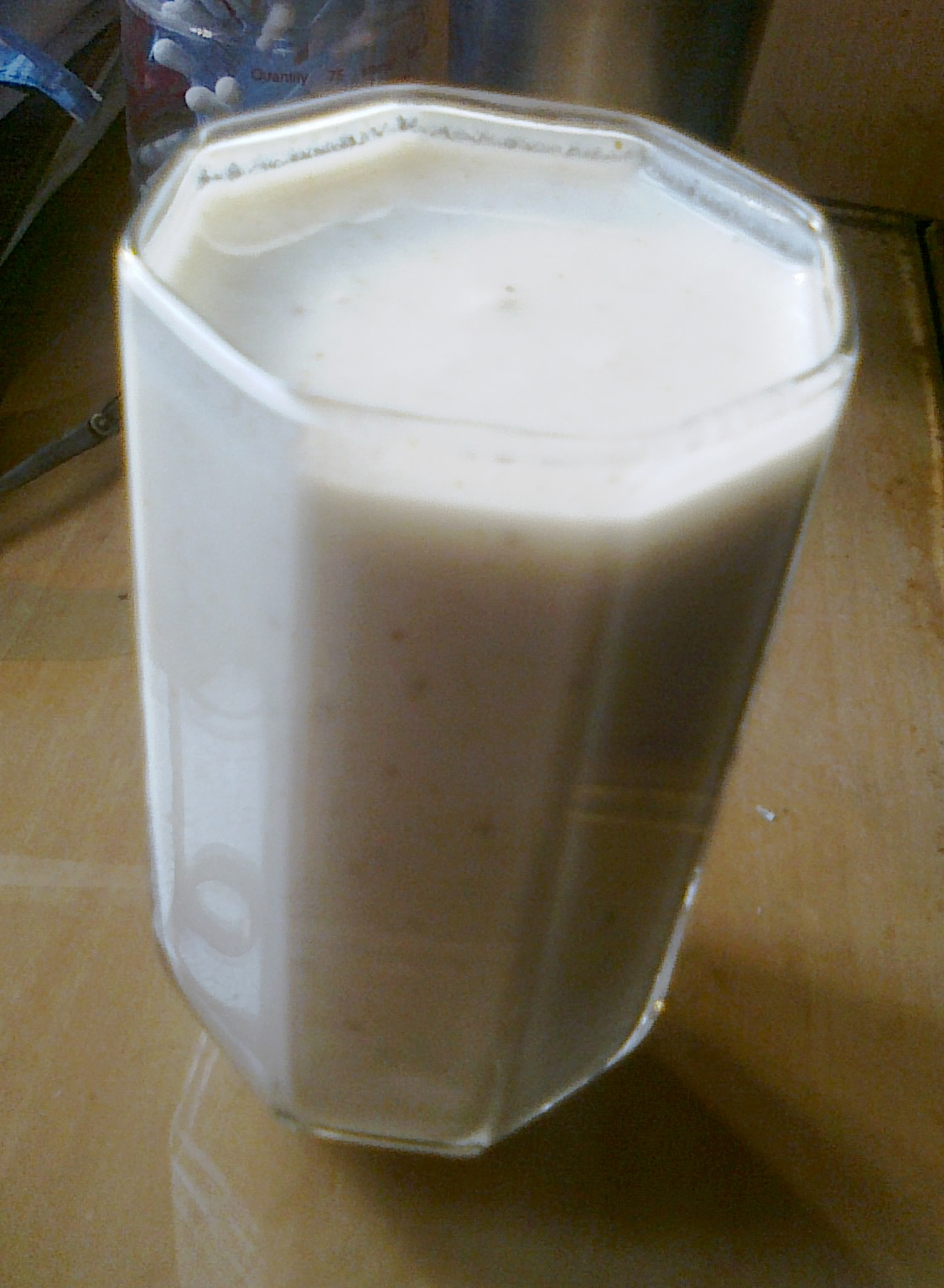
- Alternative names: Mohi (in Nepal)
- Place of origin: India, Bangladesh
- Region or state: India, Bangladesh, Nepal
- Main ingredients: Buttermilk or dahi (yogurt)

Mattha (Bhojpuri: 𑂧𑂰𑂘𑂰, romanized: Māthā, Bengali: মাঠা, romanized: Māṭhā, Marathi: मठ्ठा, romanized: Maṭṭhā, Hindi: मट्ठा, romanized: Maṭṭhā) is a beverage that originates from the Indian subcontinent. It is made from dahi (yogurt) or buttermilk mixed with spices and sugar. Plain buttermilk is also called Mattha in the Indian states of Maharashtra, Bihar, Tripura, Uttar Pradesh, West Bengal and Bangladesh Ingredients added to buttermilk to make mattha may include mint, roasted cumin seeds, asafoetida, curry leaves, salt and sugar.

Mattha may also be smoked before serving for flavour. It is generally served before or after a meal, though it can also be consumed with the meal, and it is thought to help with digestion. Mattha is similar to Chaas, which is also called chhanch or ghol, but spicier and is known as Mohi in Nepal.

== Similar drinks ==
=== Lassi ===
Lassi is a popular summer yogurt drink from India, Bangladesh and Pakistan.

=== Borhani ===
Borhani is a sweet and spicy drink from Bangladesh usually consumed during weddings and parties or celebrations such as Rojarīd and Korban. It is popular during the hot months.

=== Chass ===
Chass is a popular Indian drink.

=== Ghol ===
Ghol is a Bengali drink similar to mattha. It is usually consumed during Romjan in Bangladesh.

== See also ==
- Ayran
- Leben
- Doogh
- Dahi
- Milkshake
- List of smoked foods
- List of yogurt-based dishes and beverages
