= Spas (soup) =

Armenian soup made with yogurt

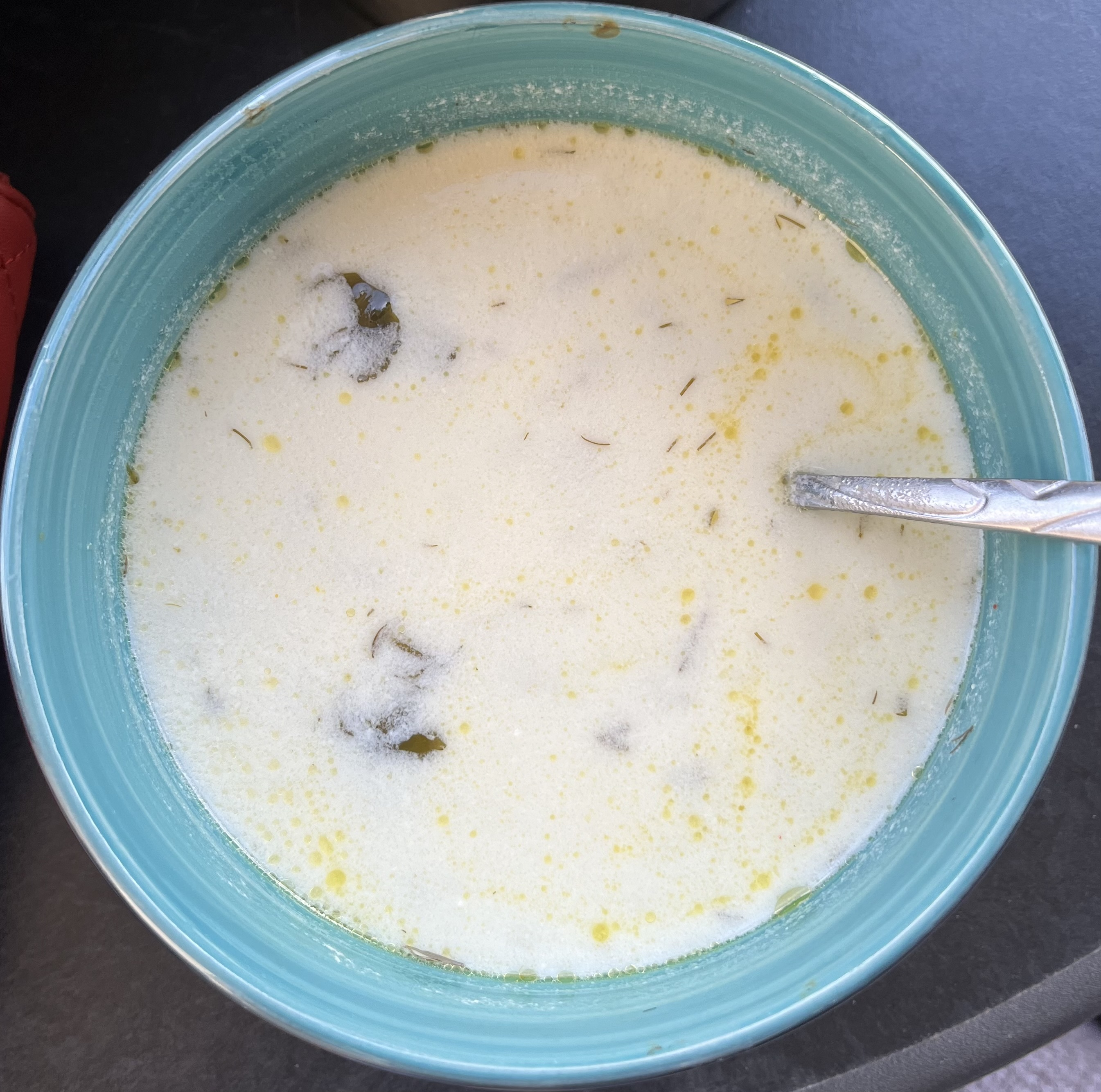
- Type: Soup
- Place of origin: Armenia
- Region or state: Armenia
- Main ingredients: Matzoon; wheat berries; flour; egg yolk; parsley; coriander
- Ingredients generally used: Optionally: rice; bulgur; barley; butter; meatballs; mint; onions; spinach

Spas (Armenian: Սպաս) is a matzoon-based soup. It is a traditional dish in Armenia. Besides matzoon (a fermented milk product), the main ingredient are herbs, and hulled wheat berries (i.e. with husks removed).

Flour, and an egg or egg yolk is included, to prevent the matzoon from curdling. Herbs, such as coriander, thyme, parsley, and sometimes mint, are added as well. Butter and regular onions, or fried onions are also often added to the soup for a richer taste. It can also be served with meatballs. Sometimes a green leaf vegetable such as spinach is added.

Traditionally there are three major variations using, respectively, rice, bulgur or barley, instead of wheat.

This soup is traditionally served warm in winter and chilled in summer.

== See also ==
- Armenian cuisine
- Ash-e doogh, a similar Iranian soup
- Dovga, a similar Azerbaijani soup
- Toyga soup, a similar Turkish soup
- List of soups
- List of yogurt-based dishes and beverages
