= Yayla çorbası =

Type of soup from Turkey

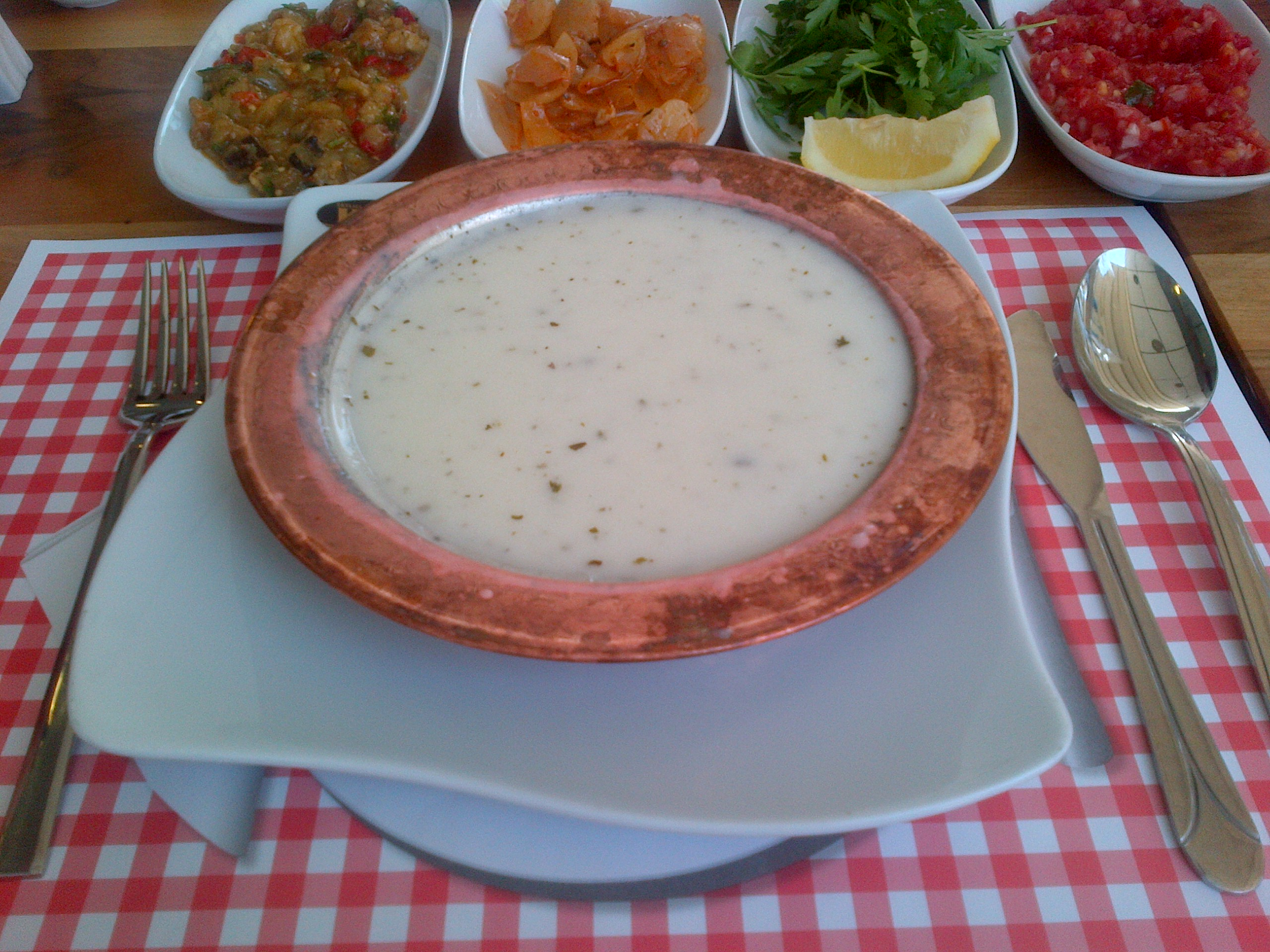
- Yayla soup
- Alternative names: Bushala
- Place of origin: Turkey, Iraq, Iran, Armenia
- Region or state: Middle East
- Serving temperature: Hot
- Main ingredients: yogurt, flour, rice, egg, spinach, mint, parsley

Yayla çorbasi ('highland soup'), also known as yoğurtlu çorba ('yogurt soup'), is a Turkish yogurt soup cooked with a variety of herbs (mint, purslane, parsley and others), rice, and (sometimes) chickpeas. Variations of it occur throughout the Middle East.

Boushala is an Iraqi variant of yogurt soup that is much creamier than yayla çorbsası, which is prepared with an assortment of herbs, Swiss chard, cilantro and rice with a strong dill flavor.

== See also ==
- Ash-e doogh, a similar Iranian soup
- Dovga
- Tarator
- Toyga soup
- List of soups
- List of yogurt-based dishes and beverages
