= Omaere =

Namibian fermented dairy product

Omaere is a fermented dairy product prepared in Namibia through the acidification of buttermilk It is produced especially in Kunene (formerly known as Kaokoland), Omaheke and Otjozondjupa regions and Botswana by the Ovaherero, Himba and Mbanderu tribes. However, it has become a popular beverage in many households and communities across Namibia and Southern Africa.

== Names ==
Fermented buttermilk is known as omashikwa in Ovambo, mpofu in Rukwangali, and omaere in Herero. Omaere is common in Namibia and used mostly with cooked oruhere (porridge, maize meal) by Herero people and by other several indigenous tribes, while many other tribes prefer to drink it on a daily basis.

== Production ==
In traditional Herero culture, the production of omaere is performed by the women, who are responsible for milking and acidifying the milk. Girls are taught how to milk and prepare omaere at an early age.

Omaere is also available as a mass-produced product.

== See also ==
- List of yogurt-based dishes and beverages
