= Chaas =

Yogurt-based drink from South Asia

Chaach
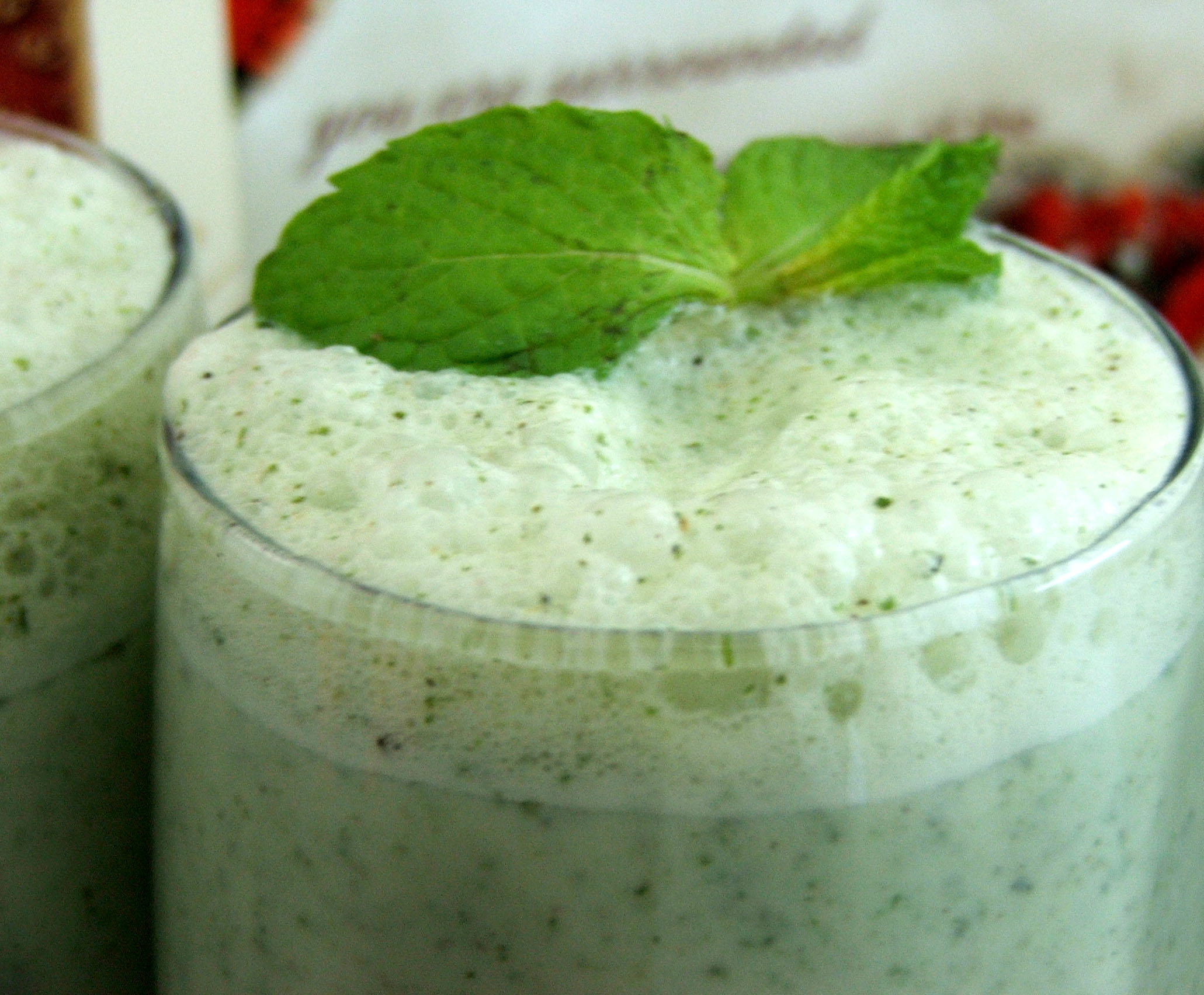
- A glass full of chaas
- Alternative names: chhas
- Course: Beverage
- Place of origin: Indian subcontinent
- Region or state: Indian subcontinent
- Associated cuisine: India
- Main ingredients: Dahi (yogurt), water, spices

Chaas (Note: see #Names for other terms) is a curd-based drink popular across the Indian subcontinent.

== Names ==
The name Chaas or Chaach is derived from Sanskrit word Chacchika (छच्छिका), meaning churned yogurt from which butter has been removed. Also called gu:છાશ chhash, hi:छाछ chhachh. IPA: [tʃʰaːs, tʃʰaʃ, tʃʰaːtʃʰ]. In Magahi and Bundeli, it is called Mattha. In Rajasthani it is called Khati chaas or khato, in Odia it is called Ghol/Chaash, moru in Tamil and Malayalam, taak in Marathi, majjiga in Telugu, majjige in Kannada, ale (pronounced a-lay) in Tulu and ghol in Bengali. In Indian English, it is often referred to as buttermilk.

== Preparation and variations ==
Chaas is made by churning yogurt (curds/dahi) and cold water together in a pot, using a hand-held instrument called madhani (whipper). This can be consumed plain or seasoned with a variety of spices or made sweet (and then known as Lassi). Chaas can be made from fresh yogurt, and the natural flavour of such chaas is mildly sweet.

== Seasoning and flavours ==
Chaas can be consumed plain, but a little salt is usually added. This is the most common seasoning for chaas. Numerous other seasonings and spices can be added to salted chaas, either singly or in combination with each other. These spices are usually roasted in a wok, using a spoonful of cooking oil, before being added to the Chaas. The spices which can be added thus are: Coarsely ground and roasted cumin seeds, curry leaves, asafoetida, grated ginger, very finely diced green chillies and Mustard seeds. Sugar can also be added to chaas, but if sugar is added, then neither salt nor spice is usually used.

Vendors have come up with several proprietary products and standardized flavours of chaas which are produced on an industrial scale and sold as bottled drinks. The best-seller among such brands is Amul's Masala Chaas, which has standardized several traditional flavours for the mass bottled-drink market. Other popular modern flavours available as bottled drinks include rose-flavoured Chaas Gulabi and mint-flavoured Mint Chaas.

== Consumption ==
In the rural areas of India, the consumption of chaas has cultural resonances and associations which are not found in the context of other beverages like tea, coffee or lassi. An earthenware pot is used to prepare chaas and store it for a few hours before consumption. Using earthenware to store the chaas helps keep it cool without the need to refrigerate it, even in the height of summer. In the extremely hot desert areas of Gujarat and Rajasthan, people consume chaas with salt after getting exposed to the sun because this may aid rehydration. Chaas or Moru is consumed more in Southern India as it rehydrates the body from the hot climate. Chaas is consumed all year round. It is usually taken immediately after meals, but is also consumed on its own as a beverage.

People also consume chaas for its health benefits. The condiments in chaas, especially pepper and ginger, help reduce the burning sensation felt with acidity. Those spices also help improve digestion. Chaas is also packed with electrolytes and water, helping the body recover from dehydration.

== See also ==
- Lassi
- List of fermented foods
- List of Indian beverages
- Mattha
- Borhani, a similar Bangladeshi drink
- Ayran, a similar Turkish drink
