= Churri =

Indian side dish

- Place of origin: India
- Region or state: Telangana State (India)
- Main ingredients: Yogurt, butter milk

Churri is an Indian spicy side dish, made from yogurt, buttermilk and chilies. It is traditionally preferred as a side dish with Biryani and roasted meats, it is a refreshing supplement to a variety of spicy dishes.

== See also ==
- List of yogurt-based dishes and beverages
