= Zhoixo =

Wild ginseng, made with yogurt

- Place of origin: Tibet
- Main ingredients: Yogurt, ginseng

In Tibetan cuisine, Zhoixo is a dish made with wild ginseng and yogurt.

== See also ==
- List of Tibetan dishes
- List of yogurt-based dishes and beverages
