= Chal =

Fermented camel milk drink of Central Asia

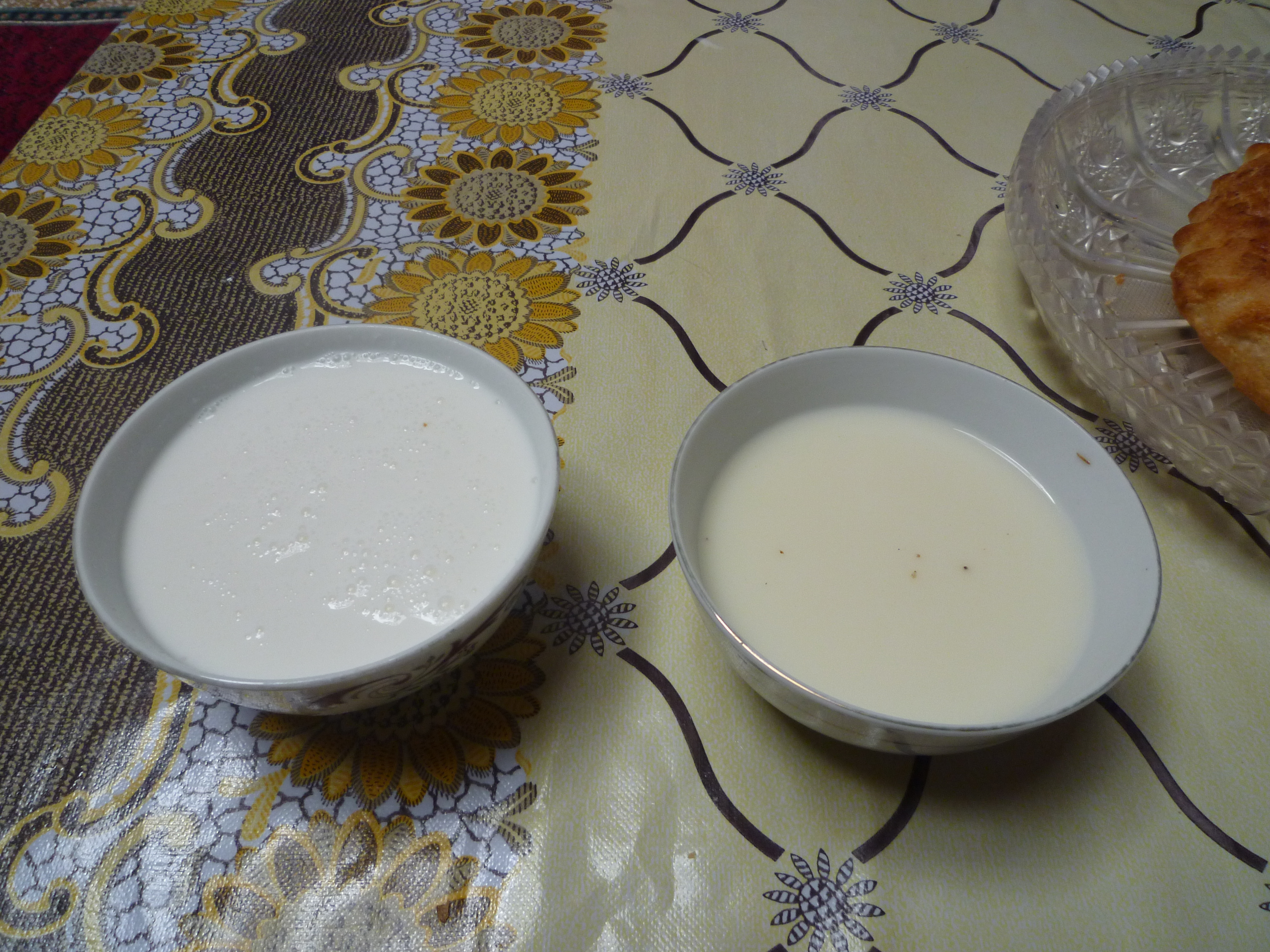
- Bowls of shubat (left), beverage of fermented camel milk, and kumis (right), beverage made from fermented mare's milk
- Alternative names: Shubat
- Place of origin: Turkmenistan, Uzbekistan and Kazakhstan
- Main ingredients: Camel milk

Chal, also shubat or khoormog (Kazakh: шұбат, şūbat, pronounced [ʂo̙bɑt], Mongolian: хоормог, khoormog, pronounced [χɔ̙ːrmɞ̙k]), is a Turkic (especially Turkmen, Uzbek and Kazakh) and Mongolic beverage of fermented camel milk, sparkling white with a sour flavor, popular in Central Asia — particularly in Kazakhstan, Uzbekistan and Turkmenistan. In Kazakhstan the drink is known as shubat, and is a staple summer food. Due to preparation requirements and perishable nature, chal has proved difficult to export. Agaran (fermented cream) is collected from the surface of chal.

== Description ==
Fermented chal is reputed to possess virucidal and virus inhibiting properties not found in fresh camel or cow milk, both in its liquid and lyophilized form — a characteristic which is (reputedly) unaffected by shelf life.

Chal is typically prepared by first souring camel milk in a skin bag or ceramic jar by adding previously soured milk. For 3–4 days, fresh milk is mixed in; the matured chal will consist of one third to one fifth previously soured milk.

Camel milk will not sour for up to 72 hours at temperatures below 10 °C (50 °F). At 30 °C (86 °F) the milk sours in approximately 8 hours (compared to cow's milk, which sours within 3 hours).

A comparison of the composition of camel milk and camel chal:

	Camel milk	“Chal”
acidity	18°D	28°D
fat	4.3%	4.3%
lactose	2.75%	1.32%
non-fat solids	8.2%	6.6%
ash	0.86%	0.75%
ethyl alcohol		1.1%
ascorbic acid	5.6 mg%	4.8 mg%

Dornic acidity is used to describe acidity in milk products, with 1 Dornic degree (1°D) equal to 0.1g of lactic acid per liter. The chal contained Lactobacilli lactic; streptococci and yeast.

Chal may be cultured with lactobacillus casei, streptococcus thermophilus, and lactose-fermenting yeasts incubating in inoculated milk for 8 hours at 25 °C (77 °F), and then subsequently for 16 hours at 20 °C (68 °F). Holder pasteurization does not affect the quality of the milk, but pasteurization at higher temperatures (85 °C/185 °F) for 5 minutes negatively impacts flavour. Chal made from pure cultures of lactobacillus casei, streptococcus thermophilus, and species of torula has markedly less non-fat solids and lactose than the milk from which it is made.

== See also ==
- Ayran
- Borhani
- Cuisine of Kazakhstan
- List of yogurt-based dishes and beverages
