= Matzoon =

Yogurt from the Caucasus

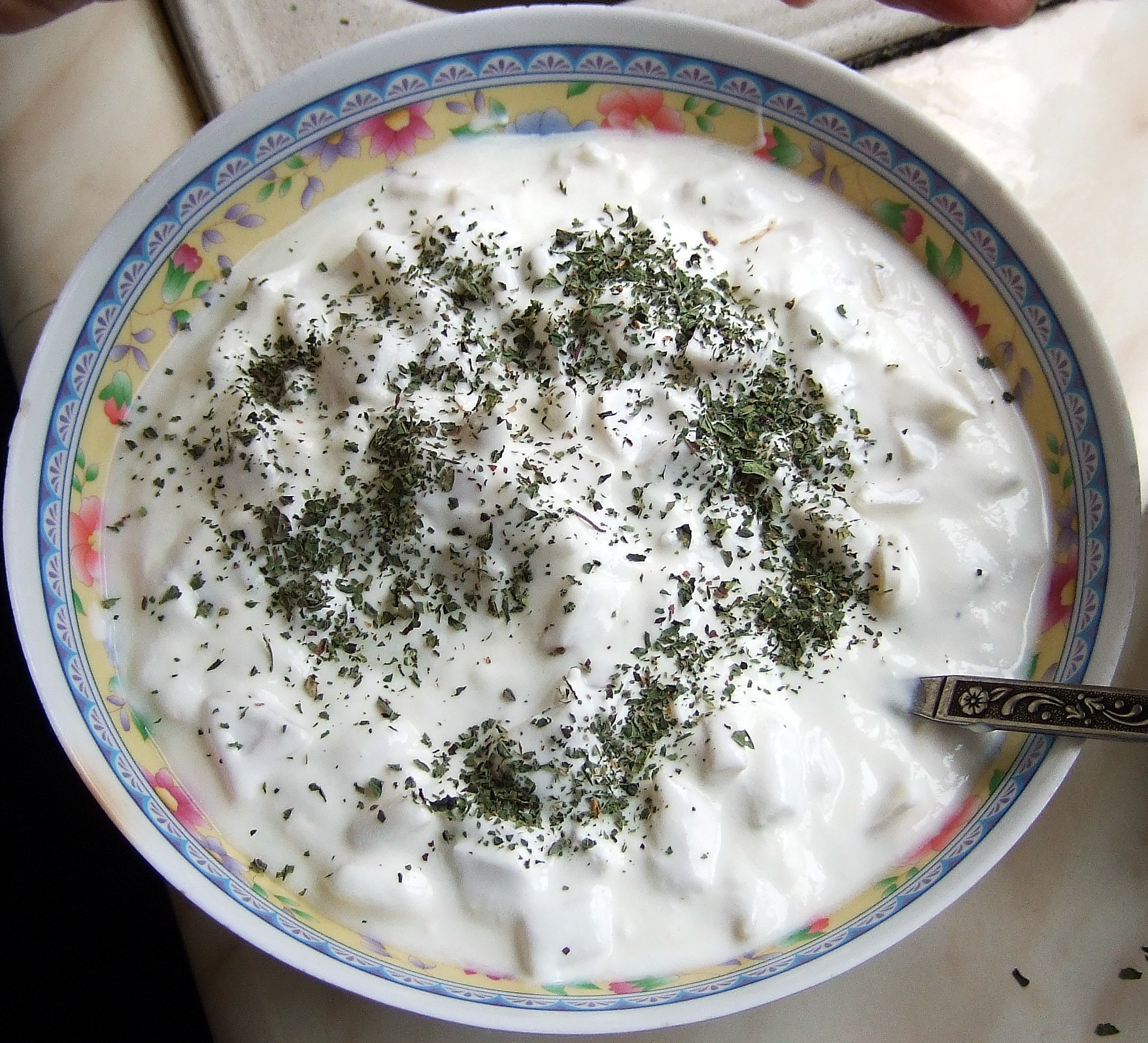
- Alternative names: Matsoni, Caspian Sea yoghurt
- Type: Fermented dairy product
- Place of origin: Armenia
- Region or state: Armenia, Georgia
- Serving temperature: cold
- Main ingredients: Milk

Matzoon (Note: Also spelled matsoon, matsoun, matzoun, madzoon, madzoun, macun, matson) (Armenian: մածուն, matsun, pronounced [mɑˈt͡sun] or [mɑˈd͡zun]) or matsoni (Note: Also spelled matzoni) (Georgian: მაწონი, mats'oni) is a fermented milk product of Armenian origin found in Armenia and Georgia. The Caspian Sea yogurt commercialized in Japan is said to be the same type of yogurt as matzoon, but a comparison of microbiota and viscosity found that the two are entirely different. Georgian matsoni has been a protected geographical indication in Georgia since 24 January 2012.

The tradition of matzoon preparation and use is included in the intangible cultural heritage list of Armenia.

== Etymology ==
The name of the product originates from Armenian matz (sour, glue). The etymology is provided by Grigor Magistros, in his Definition of grammar (11th century).

== History ==
The first written accounts of matzoon are attested in medieval Armenian manuscripts by Grigor Magistros (11th century), Hovhannes Erznkatsi (13th century), Grigor Tatevatsi (14th century) and others. Matsoni is mentioned in the 15th century Georgian medical book Karabadini by Zaza Panaskerteli-Tsitsishvili.

The Armenian immigrants Sarkis and Rose Colombosian, who started "Colombo and Sons Creamery" in Andover, Massachusetts, in 1929, introduced Matzoon around New England in a horse-drawn wagon inscribed with the Armenian word "madzoon," which was later changed to "yogurt", the Turkish language name of the product, as Turkish was the lingua franca between immigrants of the various Near Eastern ethnicities who were the main consumers at that time.

On 24 January 2012, Georgia registered a geographical indication on "matsoni". In 2022, Georgia banned the export of Armenian "matsun" yogurt to Russia via its territory. The Armenia-based company later relabeled its product as "Armenian Mountain Yoghurt".

In 2025, Armenia applied for geographical indication (GI) registration for Armenian matsun.

== Preparation ==
Matzoon is made from cow's milk (mostly), goat's milk, sheep's milk, buffalo milk, or a mix of them and a culture from previous productions. Similar to yogurt it is usually made with the following lactic acid bacteria; Lactobacillus acidophilus (original only), Lactobacillus delbrueckii subsp. bulgaricus and Streptococcus thermophilus. Lactococcus lactis ssp. cremoris was found to be a dominant bacterial strain producing polysaccharides that impart the characteristic high viscosity of matzoon.

== Preservation ==
In Armenian cuisine, matzoon can be strained to obtain kamats matzoon. Traditionally, it was produced for long-term preservation by draining matzoon in cloth sacks. Afterwards it was stored in leather sacks or clay pots for a month or more depending on the degree of salting.

Matzoon is used for the production of butter. When it is churned it separates from the buttermilk (Armenian: թան, tan). The tan can be further dried and the resulting product is known as chortan.

Matzoon can be mixed with eggs and equal amounts of wheat flour and starch to produce tarhana. Small pieces of dough are dried and then kept in glass containers. They are used mostly in soups, dissolving in hot liquids.

== See also ==
- Soured milk
