= Dovga =

Azerbaijani soup

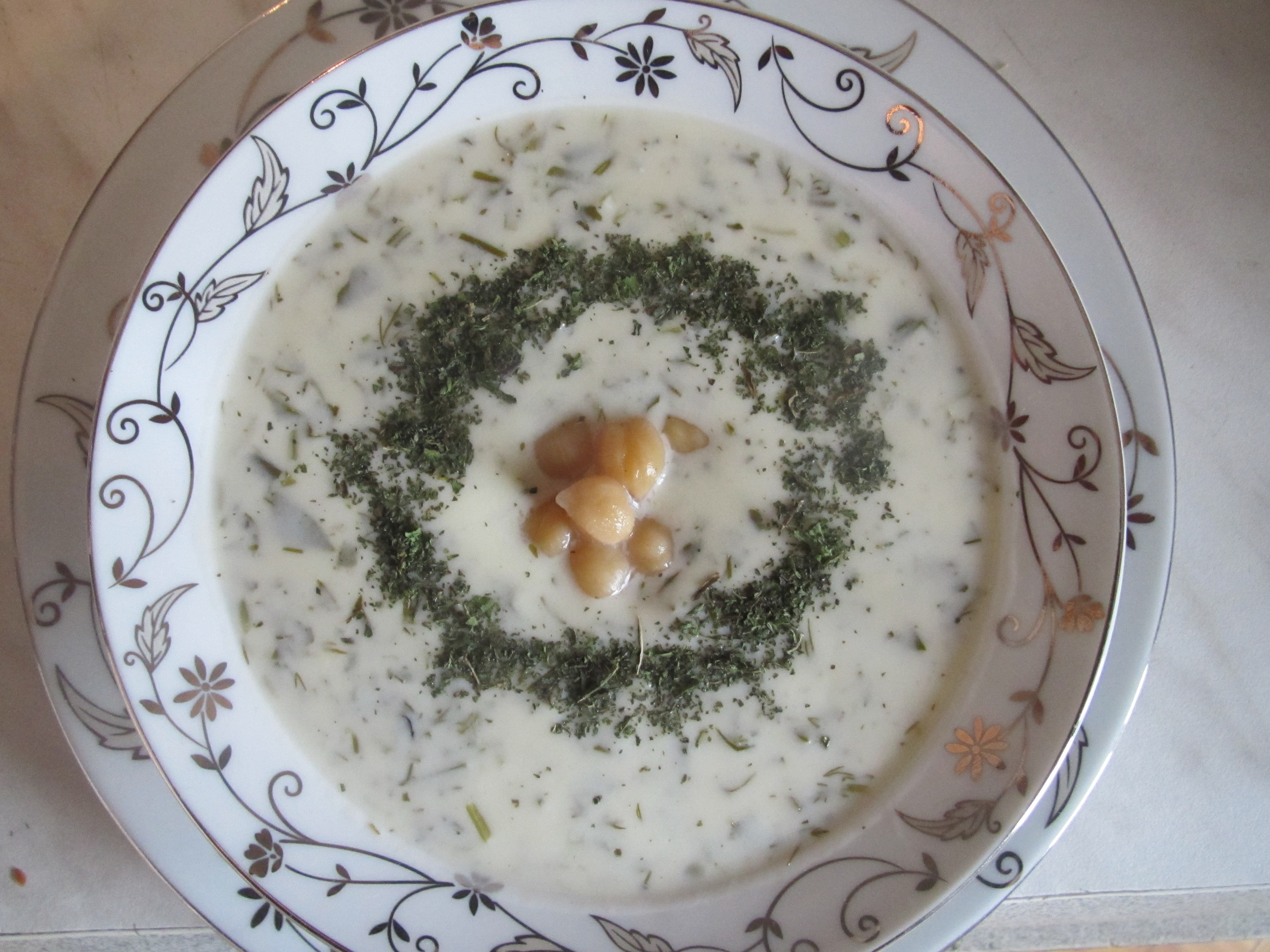
- Place of origin: Azerbaijan
- Main ingredients: Yogurt, flour, rice, egg, spinach, dill, coriander, mint
- Food energy (per serving): 150 kcal (630 kJ)
- Similar dishes: Doghramaj

Dovga (Azerbaijani: Dovğа) is an Azerbaijani soup made from plain yoghurt and herbs. Traditionally, it is served as a wedding soup and is introduced between courses of meat, intended to boost digestion.

Dovga is a soup that is cooked with a variety of herbs. While its ingredients can vary seasonally and regionally, the soup usually includes coriander, dill, mint, and spinach. The soup is sometimes cooked with rice, chickpeas, and meatballs. It is often served warm in winter or chilled in summer.

== See also ==
- Ash-e doogh, a similar Iranian soup
- Spas, a similar Armenian soup
- Toyga soup, a similar Turkish soup
- List of soups
- List of yogurt-based dishes and beverages
