= Toyga soup =

Traditional yoghurt soup from Turkey

Toyga
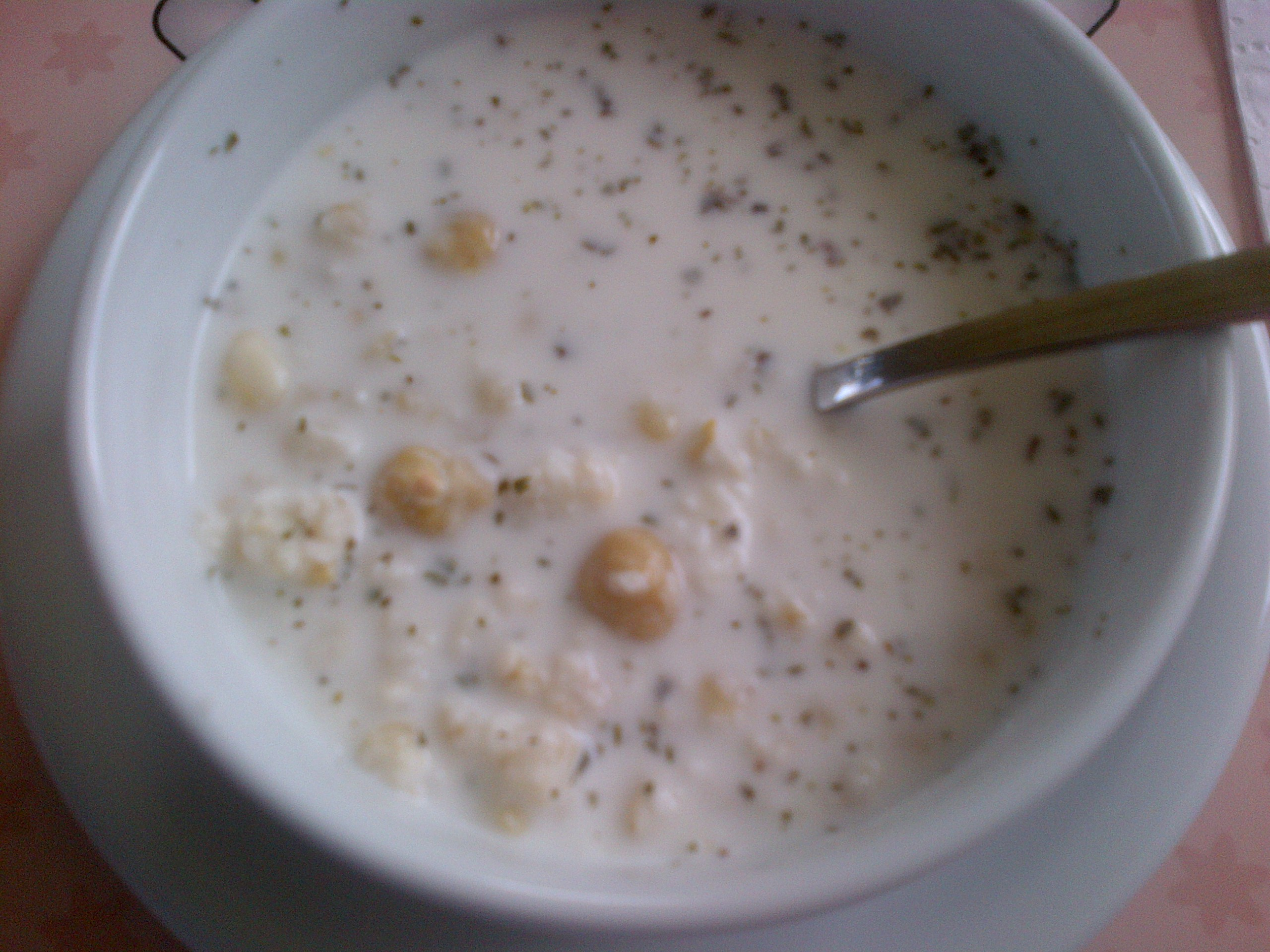
- Place of origin: Turkey
- Main ingredients: Yogurt, flour, mint, wheat, chickpea

Toyga (Turkish: Toyga or Turkish: Toğga) is a national meal of Turkish cuisine. It is a yogurt soup cooked with a variety of herbs (mentha and others), wheat and (sometimes) chickpeas.

== See also ==
- Ash-e doogh, a similar Iranian dish
- Dovga, a similar Azerbaijani dish
- List of soups
- List of yogurt-based dishes and beverages
