= Ash-e doogh =

Traditional soup of Ardabil

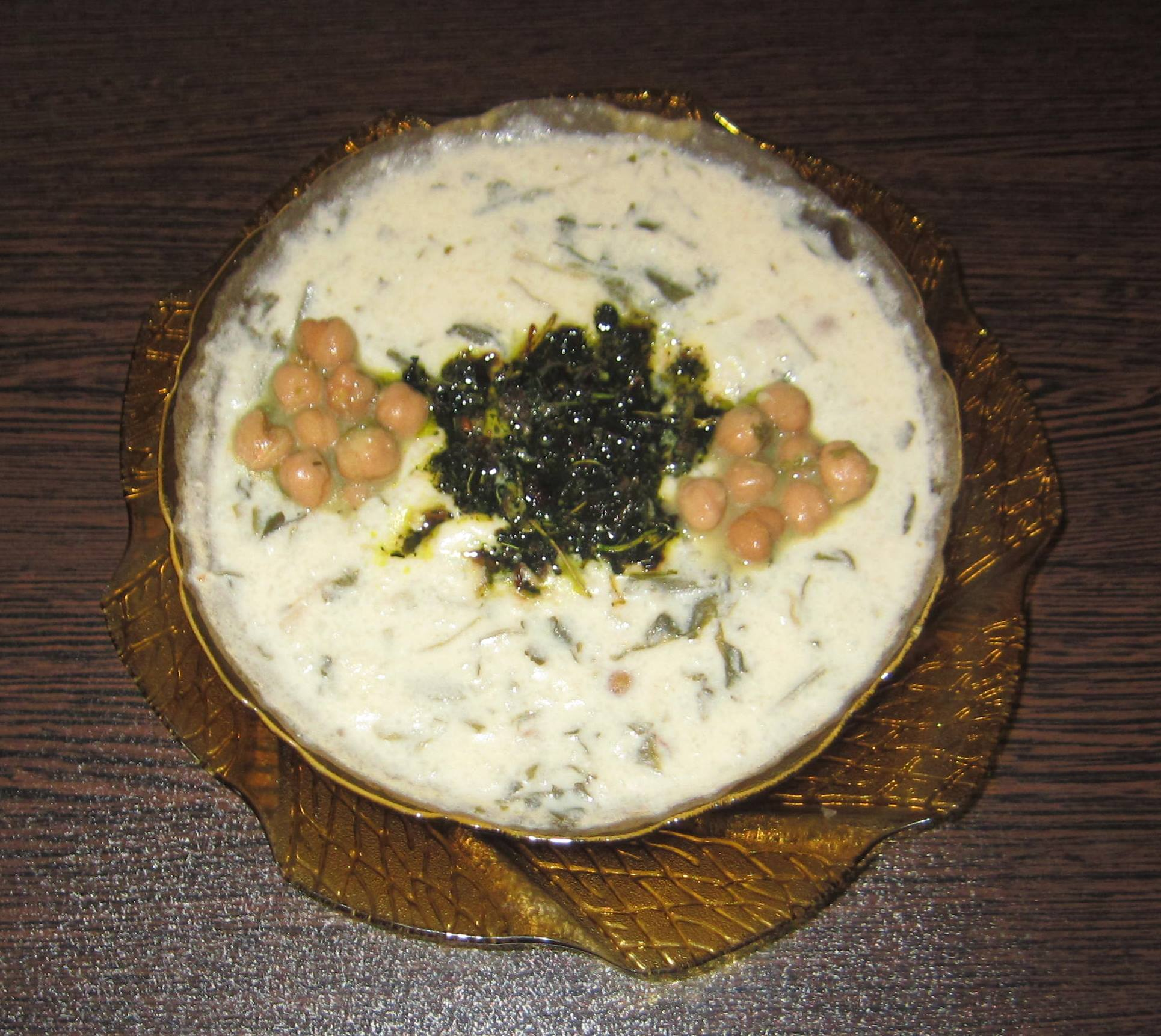
- Type: Soup
- Place of origin: Iran
- Region or state: Iran
- Serving temperature: Hot
- Main ingredients: Yogurt and leafy vegetables
- Variations: Meatballs can be included

Ash-e doogh (Note: Persian: آش دوغ, Iranian Persian: [ˈɒːʃ‿e‿duːɢ], Classical Persian: [ˈɑːʃ‿ɪ‿doːɣ]; Tajik: Оши дӯғ, romanized: Oshi do‘g‘, IPA: [ˈɔʃɪ dɵʁ]; Azerbaijani: آیران/دوگا آشی, romanized: Ayran/Dovga aşı) (/ˌɑːʃeɪ ˈduːɡ, ˌɑːʃi ˈdoʊɡ/) is a yogurt soup found in various parts of Iran, like in Azerbaijan and Shiraz, with differing but similar ingredients. It is a kind of aush. Similar dishes are found all over West Asia. It originates from the ancient city of Ardabil, located in northwestern Iran.

== Etymology ==
See Aush§Etymology

The spelling of the name of this dish varies in English and can include ash-e dugh. There are some alternative terms for this soup, including ash-e mast. Doogh in ash-e doogh means "yogurt", while ash-e is a form meaning "A(u)sh of", meaning A(u)sh (made) of/from yogurt.

== Ingredients ==
Ash-e doogh is a soup usually made with yogurt or doogh, as well as different kind of herbs (such as coriander, leek, tarragon, mint, and parsley), vegetables (such as spinach, purslane, chickpeas, peas, onion and garlic), lamb meatballs, eggs, rice, salt and several types of spices. Fried mint with oil (and sometime garlic) is used as a topping for the soup. This soup can be made vegetarian.

== Variations ==
Some people prefer to make this soup with yogurt whereas others prefer doogh.

There is a very similar Assyrian dish called bushala, which is similar soup to ash-e-doogh in that it also contains yogurt and green vegetables. Bushala is consumed by Assyrian people of Iran and Iraq, though it may feature some different ingredients.

== See also ==
- List of soups
- List of yogurt-based dishes and beverages
- Āsh, a genre of soup dishes from Iran
- Ash reshteh, Iranian noodle soup
- Dovga, a similar Azerbaijani yogurt soup
- Tarator, a similar Balkans dish
- Toyga soup, a similar Turkish soup
