= Lassi =

Yogurt-based drink from the Indian subcontinent

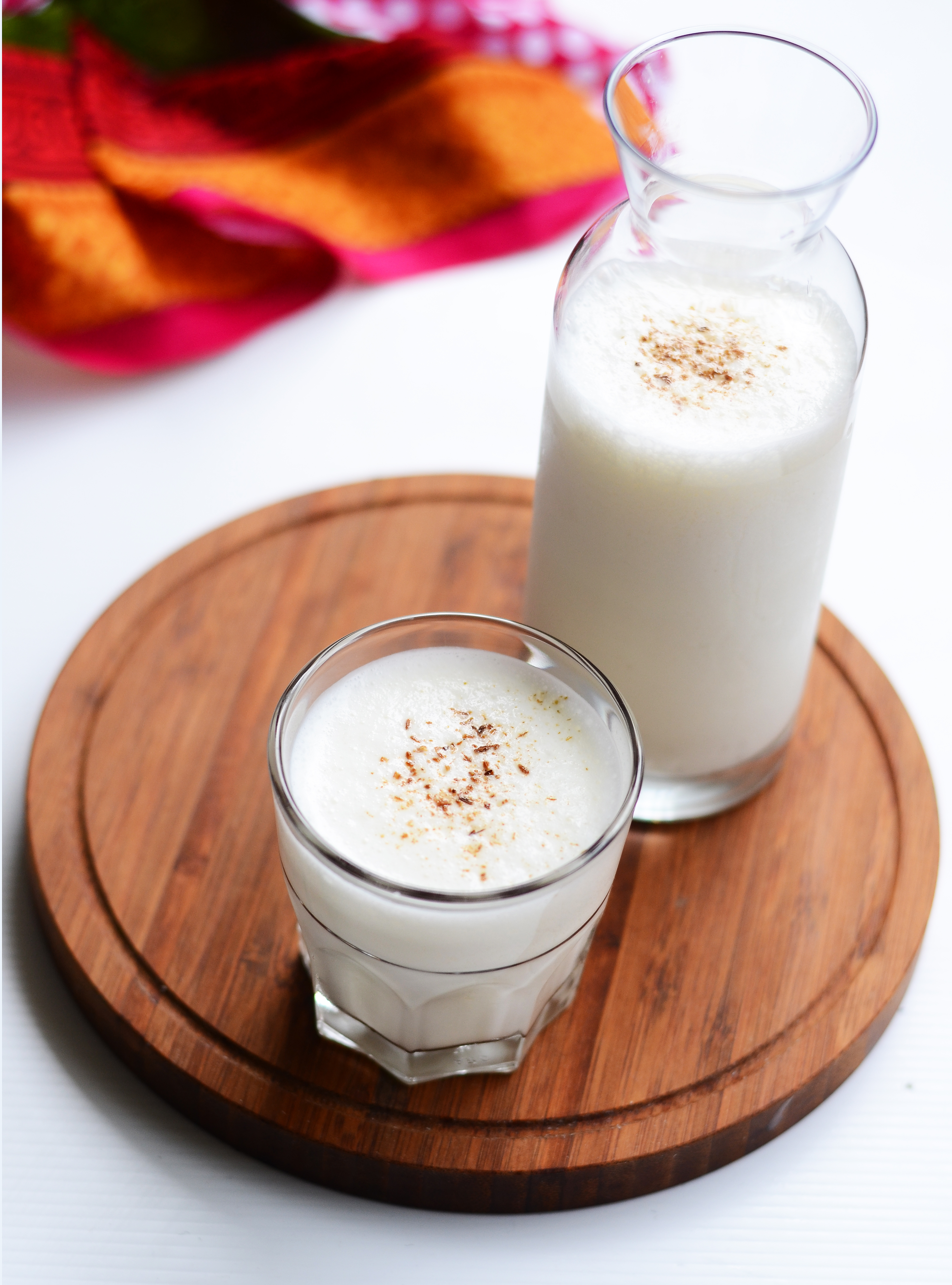
- A carafe and glass of lassi
- Type: Yogurt beverage
- Place of origin: Indian subcontinent
- Associated cuisine: Punjabi, Indian, Pakistani
- Serving temperature: Chilled
- Main ingredients: Yogurt, water

Lassi (pronounced [ləsːi]) is a yogurt–based beverage with a smoothie-like consistency. The word 'lassi' for the drink is a borrowing from Hindi, first attested in 1882; its ultimate origin is unclear, and has been suggested as derived ultimately from Sanskrit lasya (stickiness) or rasah (juice).

Lassi is prepared by blending yogurt, water, and spices. In Punjab, where the drink originated, the yogurt is traditionally made from water buffalo milk. Variations include the addition of salt, cumin or cardamom. Lassi is traditionally served in a clay cup known as kulhar. In the 21st century, lassi is commonly consumed in many world regions.

== Varieties ==
=== Namkin / Namkeen lassi ===
Namkin or namkeen (salty) lassi is made by adding salt, black pepper, cumin, and sugar to the yogurt-water mixture.

=== Lassi masalewal ===
Lassi masalewal (spicy lassi) is made by adding ingredients such as almonds, ginger, green chilies, and pistachios to namkin lassi.

=== Meethi lassi ===
Meethi (sweet) lassi is made by adding cardamom, rosewater, and saffron to the yogurt-water mixture.

=== Bhang lassi ===
Bhang lassi is a cannabis-infused drink that contains bhang, a liquid derivative of cannabis, which has effects similar to other eaten forms of cannabis. It is legal in many parts of India and mainly sold during Holi, when pakoras containing bhang are also sometimes eaten. Uttar Pradesh has licensed bhang shops where bhang lassi and other products can be bought.

=== Others ===
Fruits such as mangos and strawberries may be added to the yogurt-water mixture to yield, for example, mango lassi and strawberry lassi.

== Gallery ==
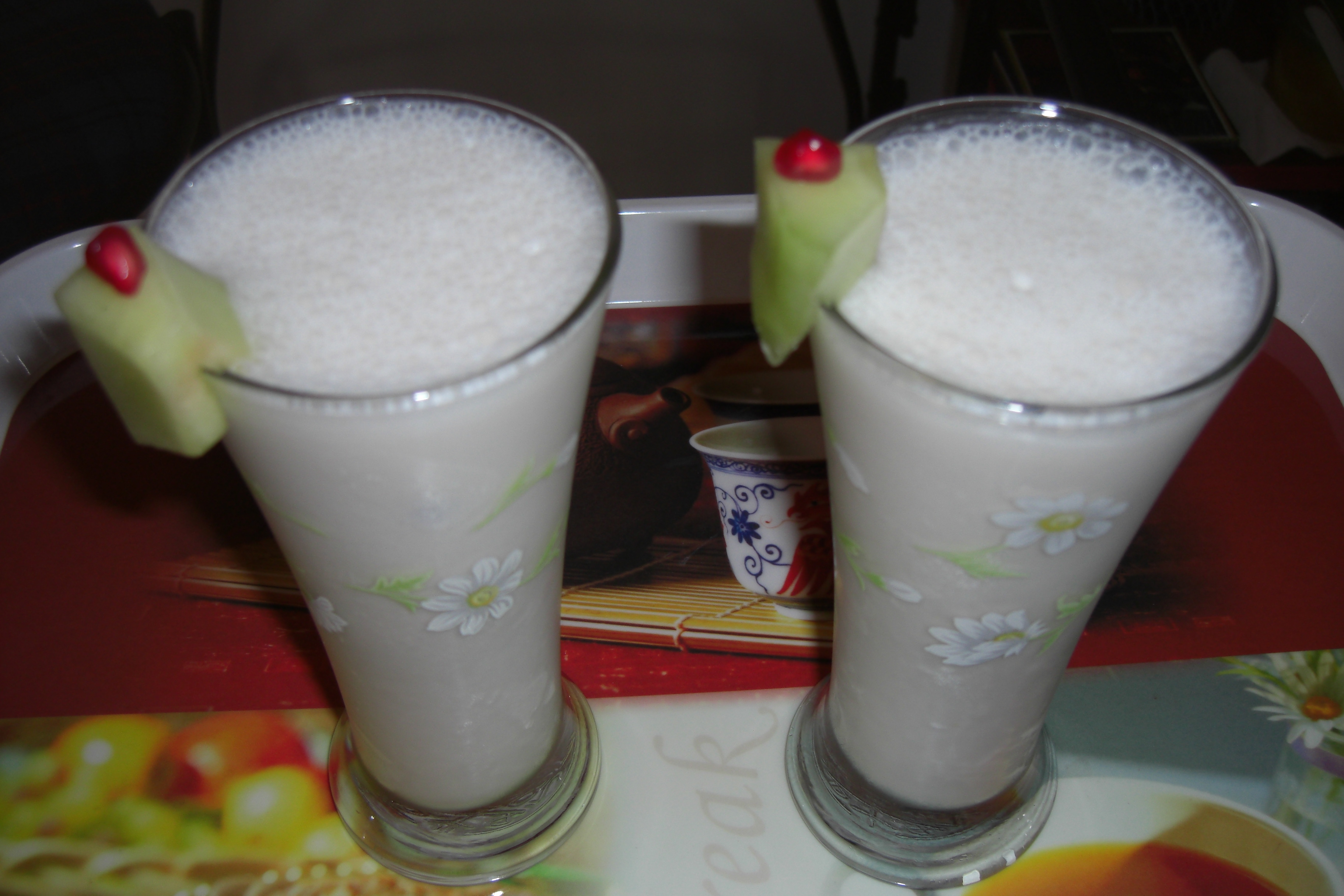
Lassi served in a restaurant.

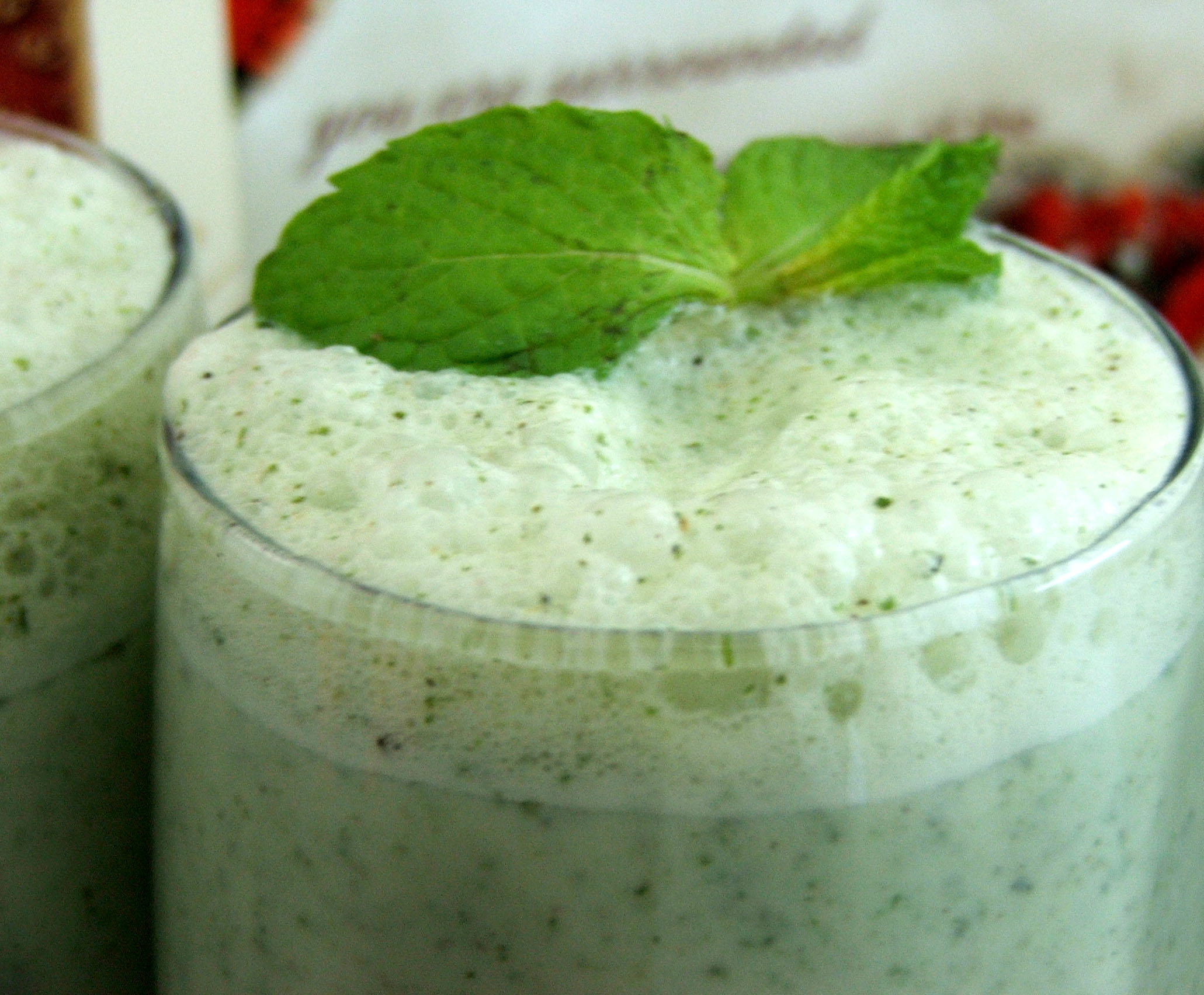
Mint lassi

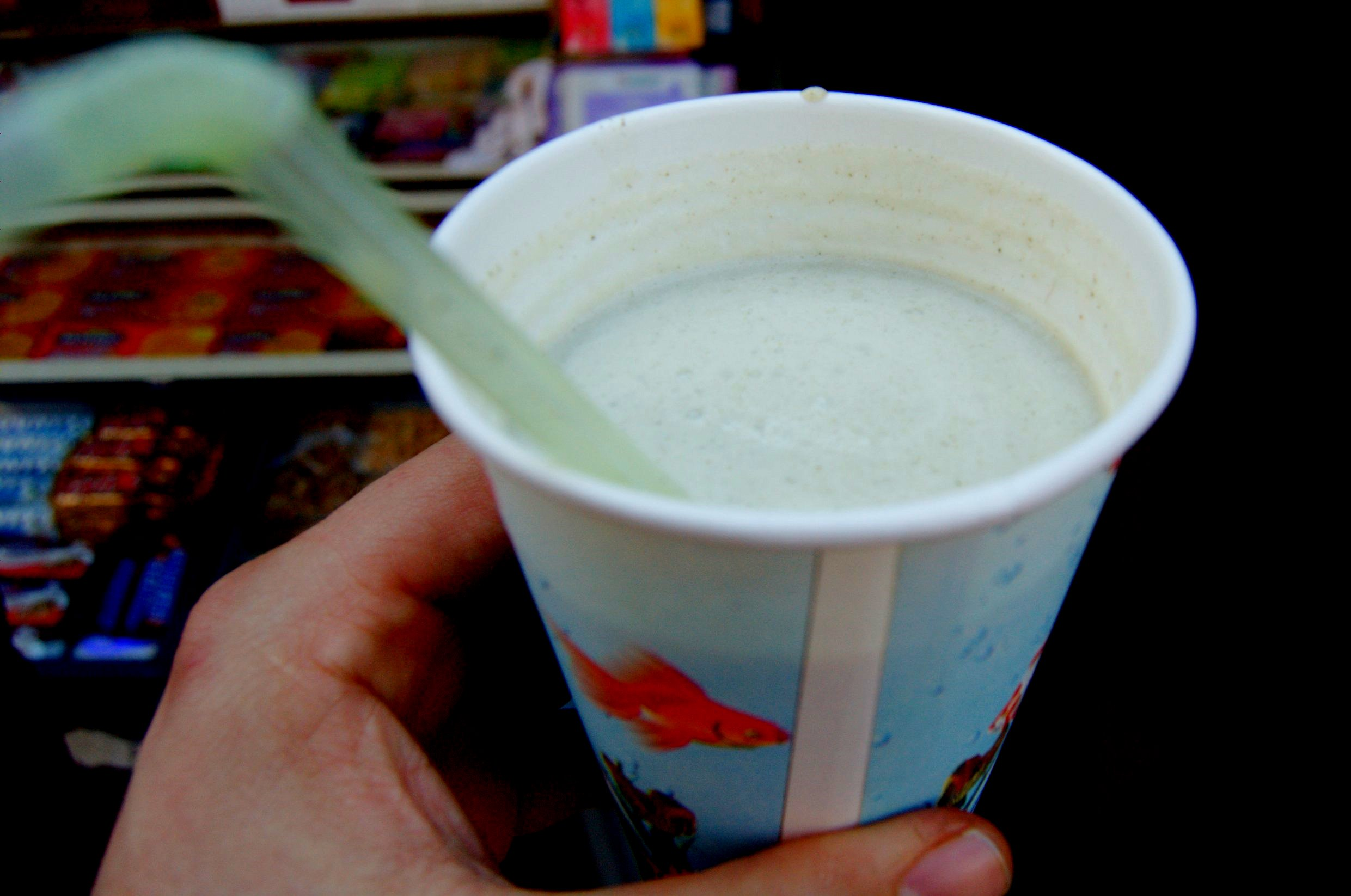
Bhang lassi

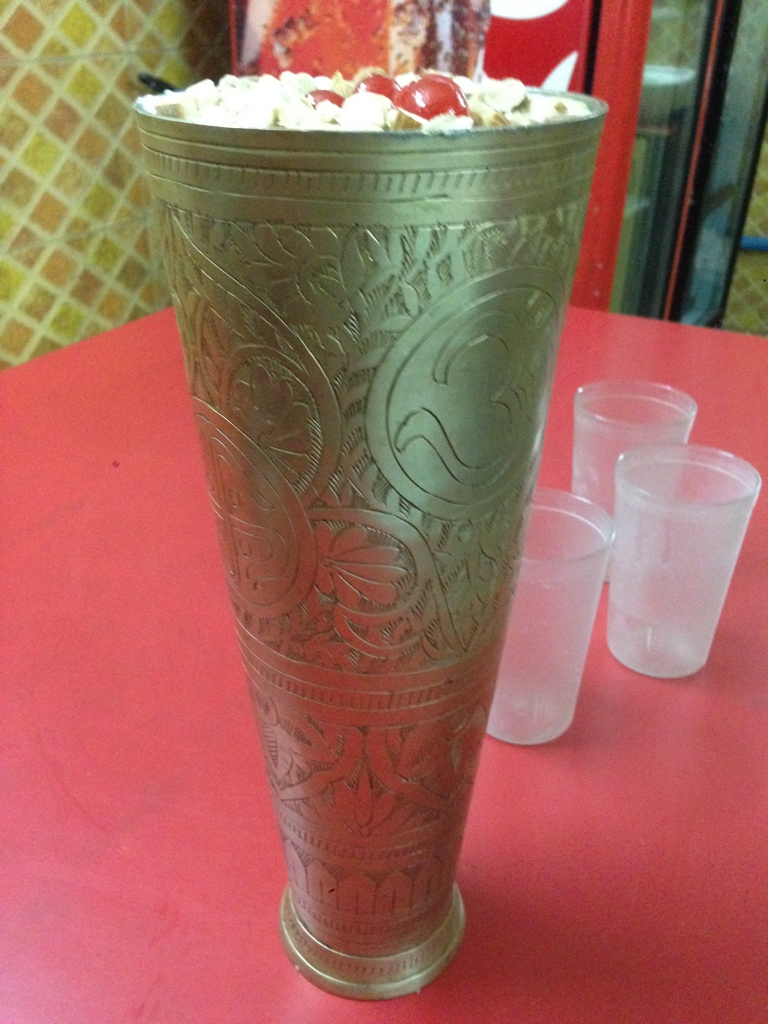
Lassi served in a brass cup in Patiala

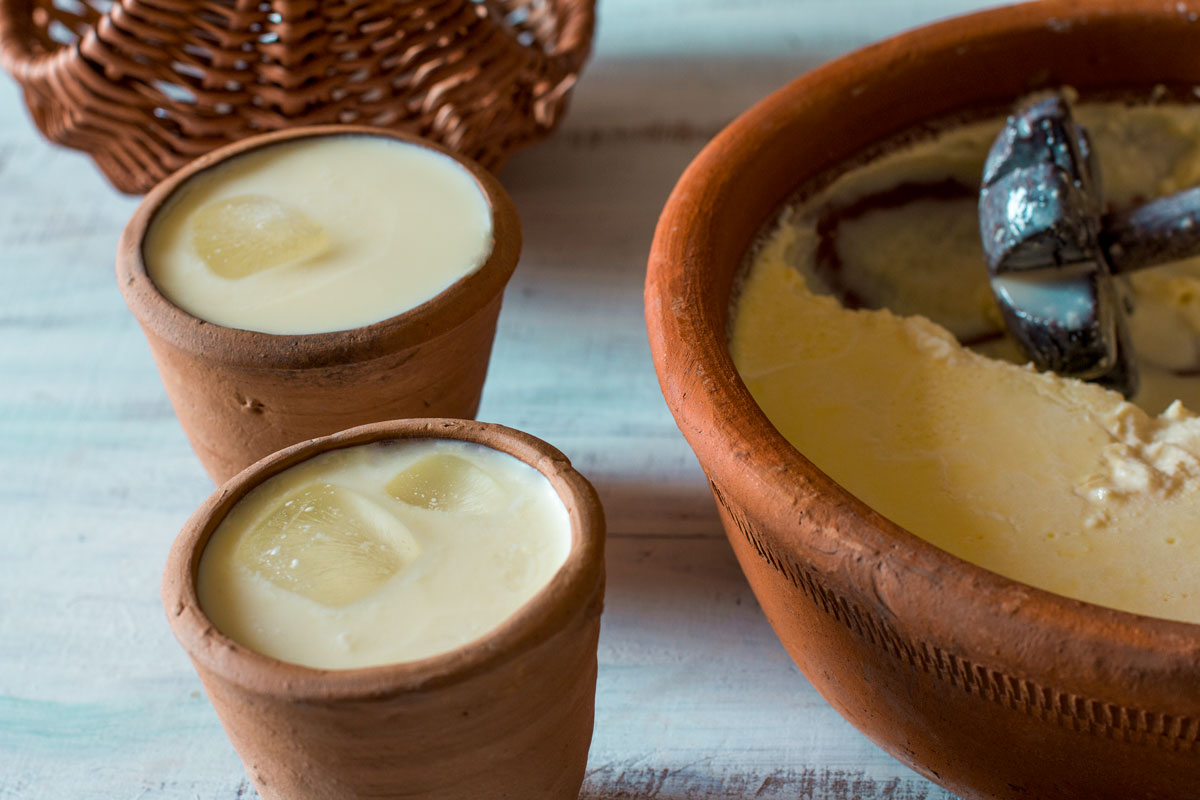
Benaras-ki-lassi, a style of lassi from Varanasi served in kulhar

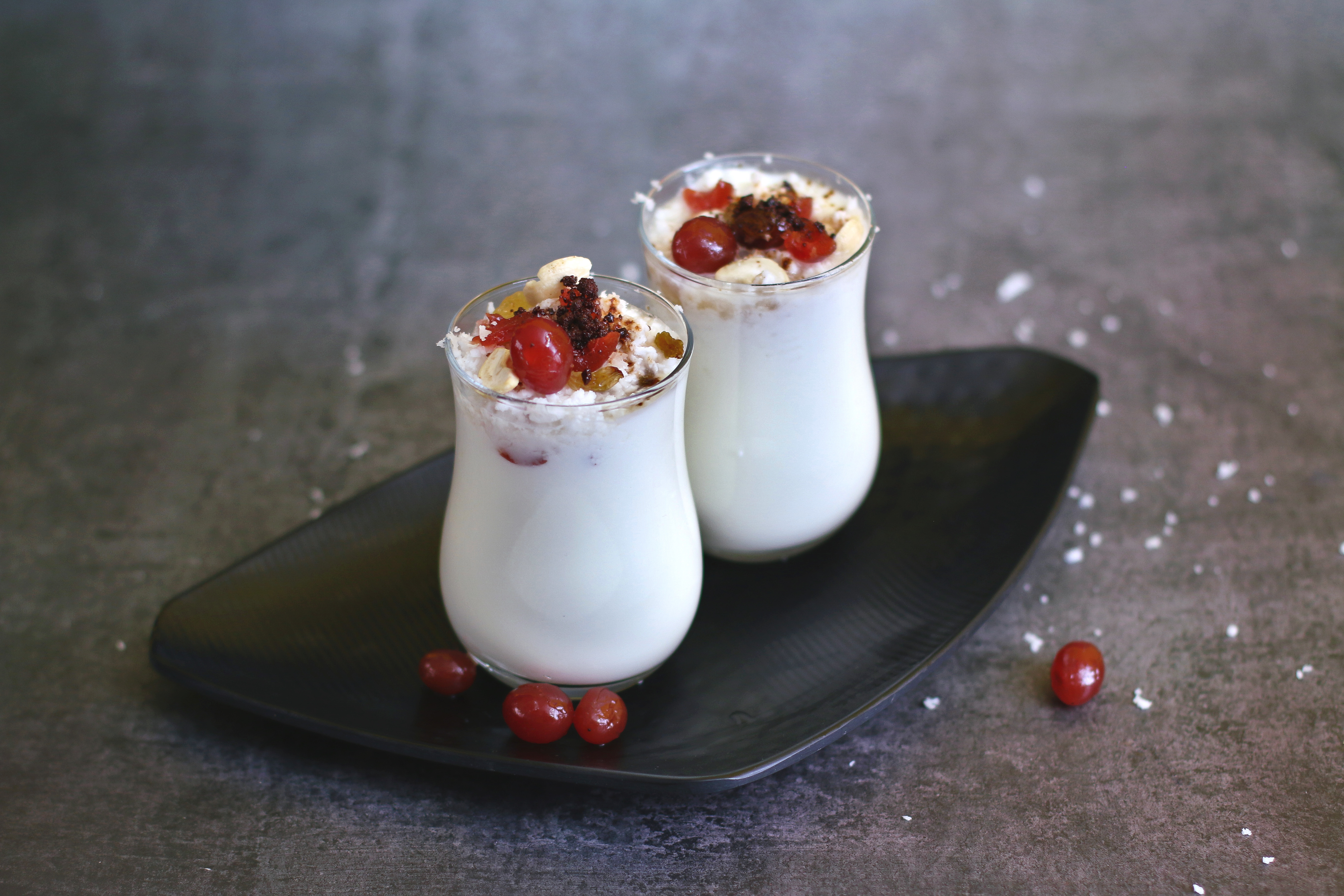
A style of lassi from Odisha

== See also ==
- Smoothie
- List of yogurt-based dishes and beverages
