= Doogh =

Iranian fermented milk drink

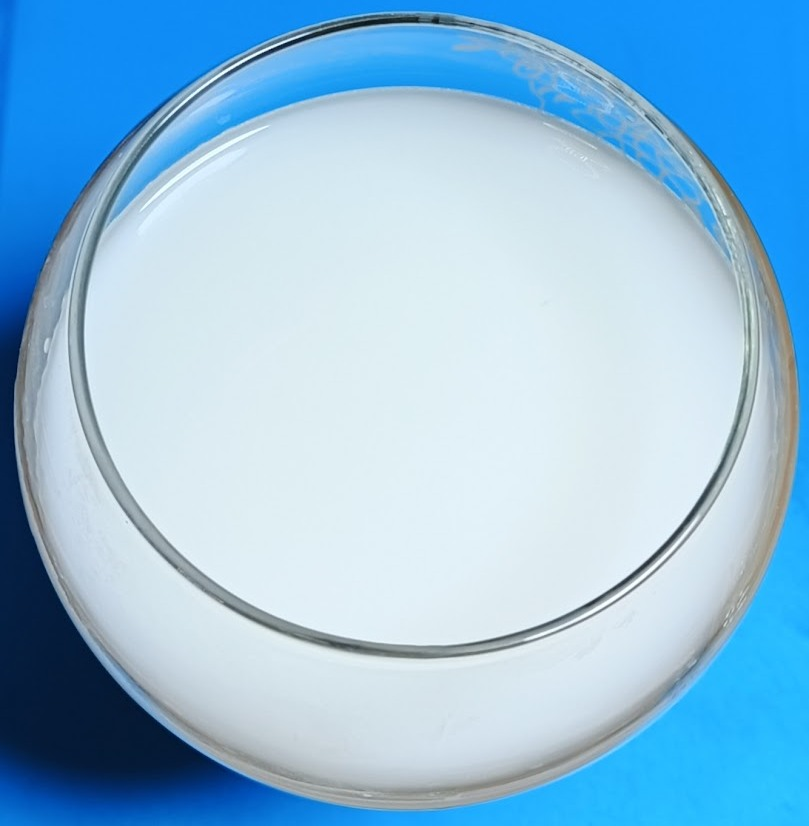
- Type: Fermented dairy product
- Course: Beverage
- Place of origin: Ancient Persia
- Associated cuisine: Iranian cuisine
- Serving temperature: Cold
- Main ingredients: Yogurt or buttermilk, milk, water, salt

Doogh (Persian: دوغ) is a cold and savoury Persian drink. It is made with fermented milk. Unlike ayran, a yoghurt drink of Turkish origin, doogh is not diluted yogurt. According to the Iranian Ministry of Food Standards, doogh "is a drink resulting from lactic fermentation of milk whose dry matter is standardized by diluting yogurt (after fermentation) or buttermilk (before fermentation)."

== Production ==
Milk and plain yogurt, at a ratio of 15:1, are mixed and placed on low heat until uniformly warm. Salt is added and the mixture is poured into a closed container and placed in a warm area for 3–4 days, after which it is ready to serve. The longer the drink is left to ferment, the more savoury it becomes. Many subcultures in Iran prefer a longer fermentation period.

== Etymology ==
Doogh has historically been referenced in Persian literature as the representation of a "sour version" of milk. It is present in Avestan scripture, and essentially seems to have been another word for milk, or for the product of milking thus, the word doogh derives from the Persian word for milking, dooshidan.

== History ==
Doogh is an Iranian fermented drink that has long been a popular drink and was already consumed in ancient Iran (Persia). Doogh is mentioned in Persian literature from the middle period. In the Persian physician's Avicenna's Canon of Medicine the word denotes milk used medically.

== Culture ==
Doogh is recognized as one of the main Iranian beverages to serve alongside meals. Persian dishes such as Dizi and Chelow Kabab are the most commonly served with doogh.

In some parts of Iran, mainly Isfahan, doogh is served with the sweet pastry Gosh-e fil as a hallmark tradition of the city and snack.

In Iranian popular culture doogh is also considered to have a sedative effect. Pop culture jokes imply that it is a bad idea to drink doogh during lunch at work or school.

== See also ==
- Ash-e doogh
- Iranian cuisine
