= Ayran =

Yogurt-based, salted drink

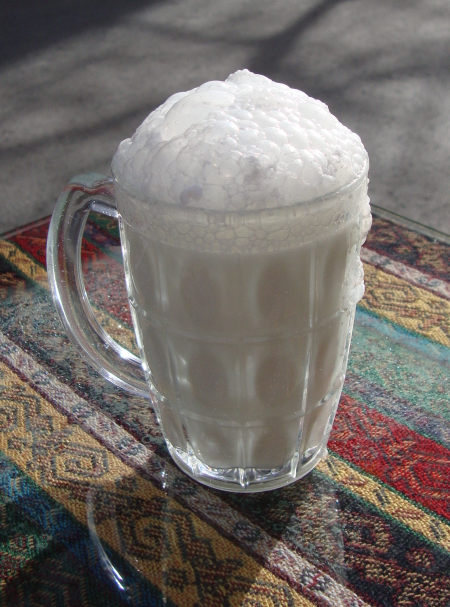
- Ayran in a glass with a frothy head
- Alternative names: Doogh, dhallë, daw, avemast, mastaw, çeqilmast, xynogala, chalap, shanina, suwsab, tan, jeran, or yogurt milk
- Type: Fermented dairy product
- Course: Beverage
- Region or state: Central Asia, West Asia
- Serving temperature: Cold or lukewarm (depending on preference)
- Main ingredients: Yogurt, water, salt (typical); Milk, fast ayran culture (industrial production for restaurant consumption)

Ayran (Note: Also known as dhallë, dew, Jaree'a, leben, avamast, çiqilmast, mastaw, shaneena, or xynogala) (/aɪˈrɑːn/ eye-RAHN, also ayryan) is a cold savory yogurt-based beverage found throughout Central Asia, the Balkans, and the Middle East. The drink is a heterogeneous mixture that has been consumed by Turkic peoples for approximately 1,000 years. The principal ingredients are yogurt, water and salt. Herbs such as mint may be added, and some varieties are carbonated. It is a national drink of Turkey and is served in most restaurants in Bulgaria.

== Etymology ==
Ayran (cf. airag in Mongolian: 'mare milk', uyran (уйран) in Chuvash: 'buttermilk') is mentioned in Mahmud al-Kashgari's 11th century Dīwān Lughāt al-Turk, although he did not give any information how ayran was made. The word is derived from the Old Turkic root adır- ("to separate"), cf. Turkish ayır- ("to separate").

== Preparation ==
Ayran is served chilled and often as an accompaniment to grilled meat, bread or rice, especially during summer. It is made by mixing yogurt with chilled or iced water and is sometimes carbonated and seasoned with mint. It has been variously described as "diluted yogurt" and "a most refreshing drink made by mixing yogurt with iced water".

The traditional method of preparing this drink among various Iranic peoples involves pouring yogurt into a waterskin —known as mashk (مَشک) in Persian, Luri, and Kurdish, and maskah (مَسکه) in Afghanistan— and vigorously shaking it to separate the butter from the liquid. The process takes a considerable amount of time and effort and is often made easier by suspending the waterskin from a wooden frame called malār (مَلار) using woollen ropes, allowing it to swing freely. Once the butter is extracted, the remaining liquid, called doogh, is collected and consumed as a refreshing beverage. In Pakistan, ayran is called Namkeen Lassi (نمکین لسی).

== History ==
Ayran was developed in Central Asia by Turkic tribes. A c. 1000 CE Turkic dictionary, Dīwān ul-Lughat al-Turk, defines ayran as a "drink made out of milk".

Other similar but not identical drinks include doogh in Iran, t’an (Armenian: թան) in Armenia, and lassi in the Indian subcontinent. However, they can also differ from doogh.

== Variations ==
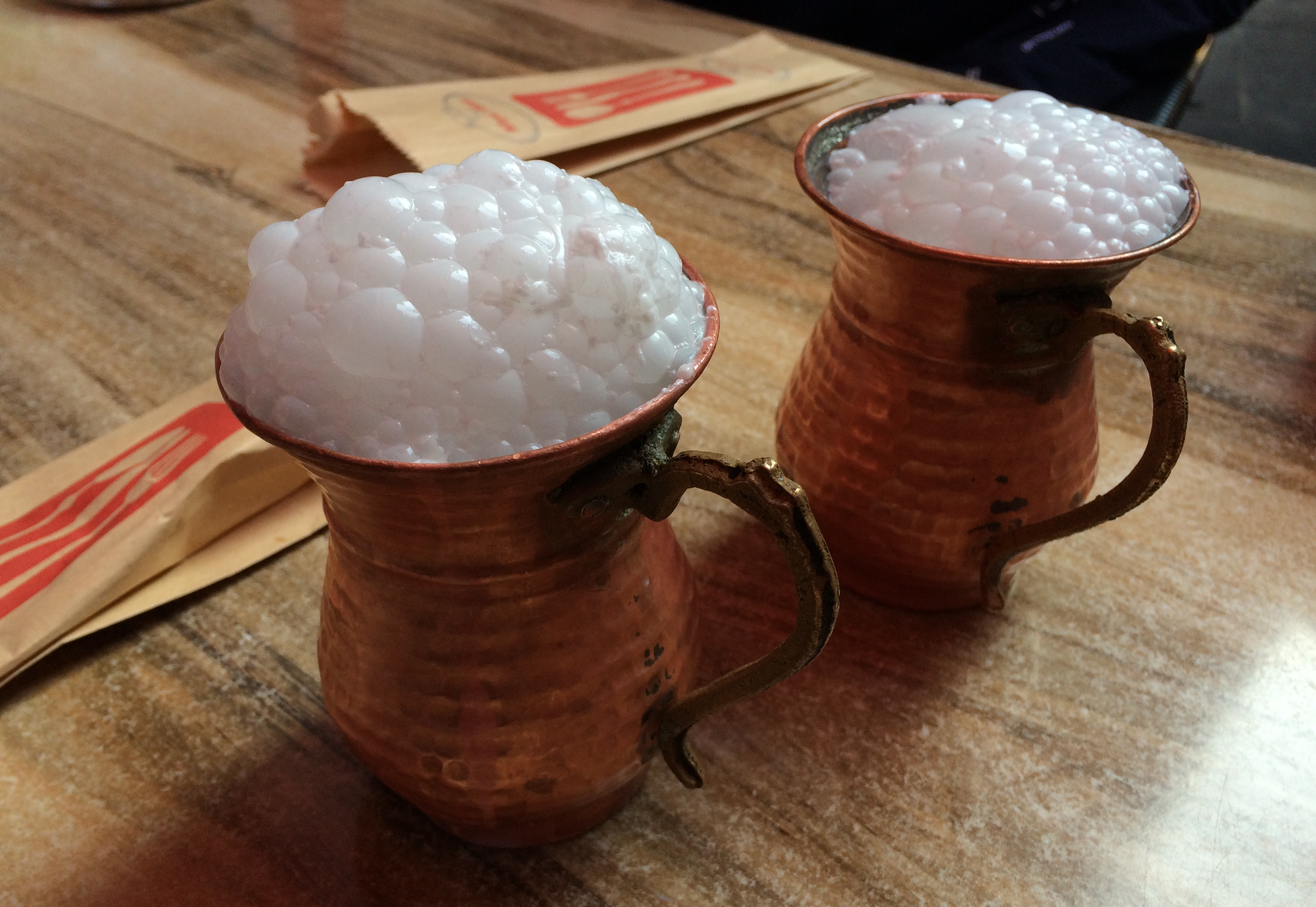
Turkish Yayık Ayran is served in a copper pitcher.

Salt, black pepper, dried mint, and lime juice can be mixed in. Diced cucumbers can be added to provide a crunchy texture to the beverage. Some varieties of ayran are carbonated. In Balkan countries, the drink is usually consumed for breakfast or lunch, usually combined with pastries like banitsa, börek or other pastries.

In Turkey, there are three well-known registered ayran variations; one of them is Susurluk Ayranı. In this version, ayran is drawn from the vat and rapidly poured back into it through a narrow pipe from above. During this circulation process, the fat in the ayran creates a foam on its surface.

In some eastern parts of Turkey, ayran is made using a mixing method, which results in a very frothy drink known as Yayık Ayranı. In the Malatya region, there is a form of spicy ayran known as Malatya Spicy Ayran. It has gained a registration and patent on 11.04.2022.

In Afghanistan, ayran (known as doogh or shromba) is a summer beverage. It is made with yogurt, salt, mint, diced cucumbers, lime, and is sometimes carbonated. It is drunk alongside bolani, Afghan flatbread, and other picnic foods.

In Albania, ayran is known as dhallë and is made exclusively with yogurt, salt and water, and it is served cold. The name 'dhallë' comes from mixed and shaken '.

In Cyprus, ayrani (αϊρανι) is made with sour sheep yogurt, water, salt and mint.

In Russia and some other Eastern European countries, a variant is called kefir which has a similar taste but is instead made using fermented milk from kefir grains. The term may have derived from the Turkic word köpür ("to froth"). Kefir is also popular in Turkey, though its consumption is less widespread than traditional fermented drinks such as ayran.

== Turkish national drink status ==
Recep Tayyip Erdoğan, a Turkish politician who has held the posts of President and Prime Minister, has promoted ayran as a national drink. Speaking at a 2013 WHO Global Alcohol Policy Conference held by simar in Istanbul, Erdoğan contrasted ayran with beer, which he claimed was a recent introduction to Turkey.

Nevertheless, sales of ayran in Turkey lag behind other non-alcoholic beverages. According to a 2015 joint statement from the Soft Drink Producers Association, the Sparkling Water Producers Association, and the Milk Producers and Exporters Union of Turkey, ayran consumption during Ramadan had declined every year from 2010 to 2015.

In 2015, Turkey's Ministry of Customs and Trade imposed a 220,000 TL fine (approximately $70,000) on state-owned Çaykur manufacturers, stating that ayran had been "insulted without reason" in one of their advertisements for iced tea, in which the rapper Ceza rapped that ayran makes him sleepy; the ministry halted advertisements of Çaykur's competing iced tea product.

== Gallery ==
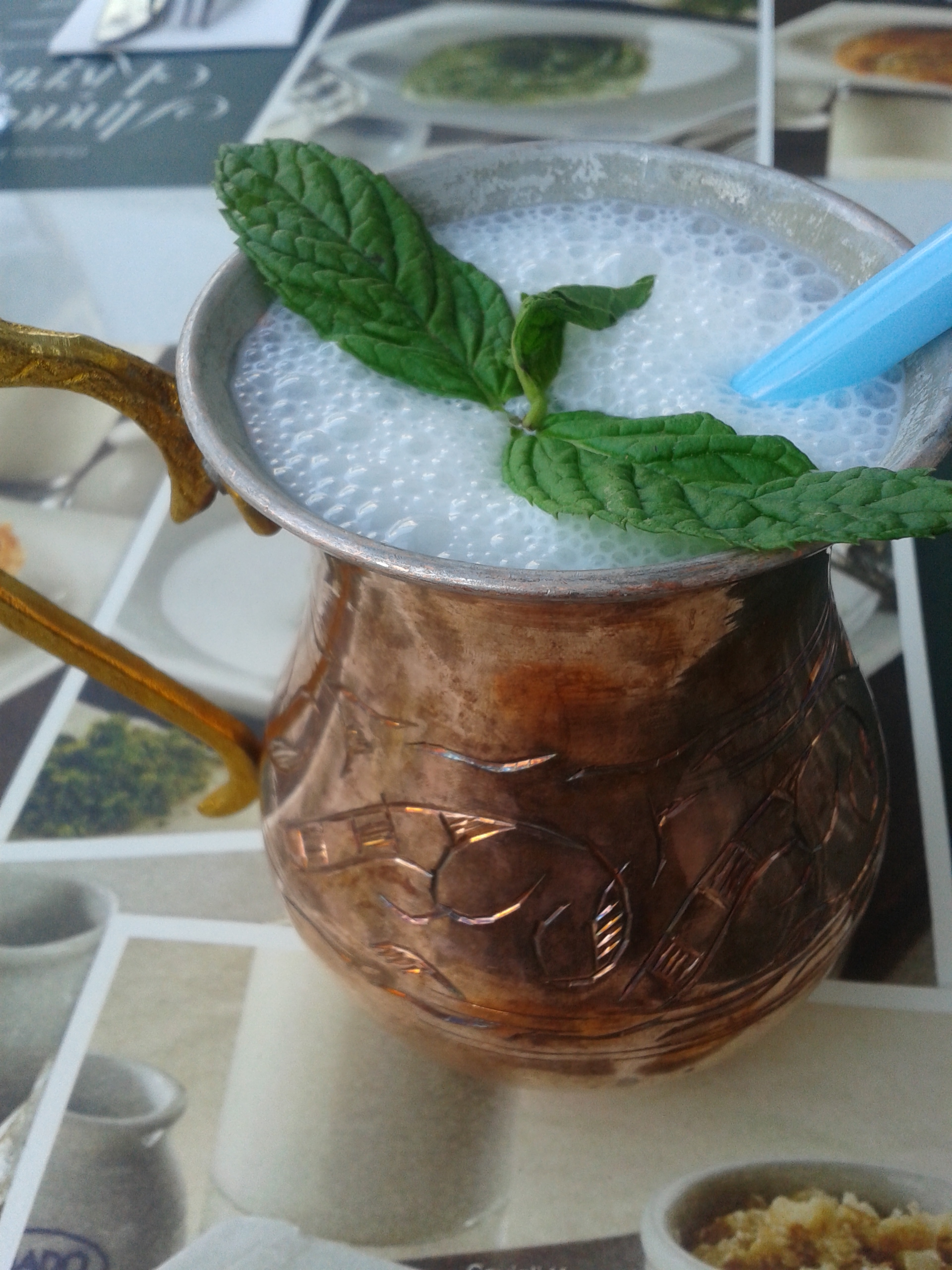
Ayran served in traditional way with copper cup (maşrapa)

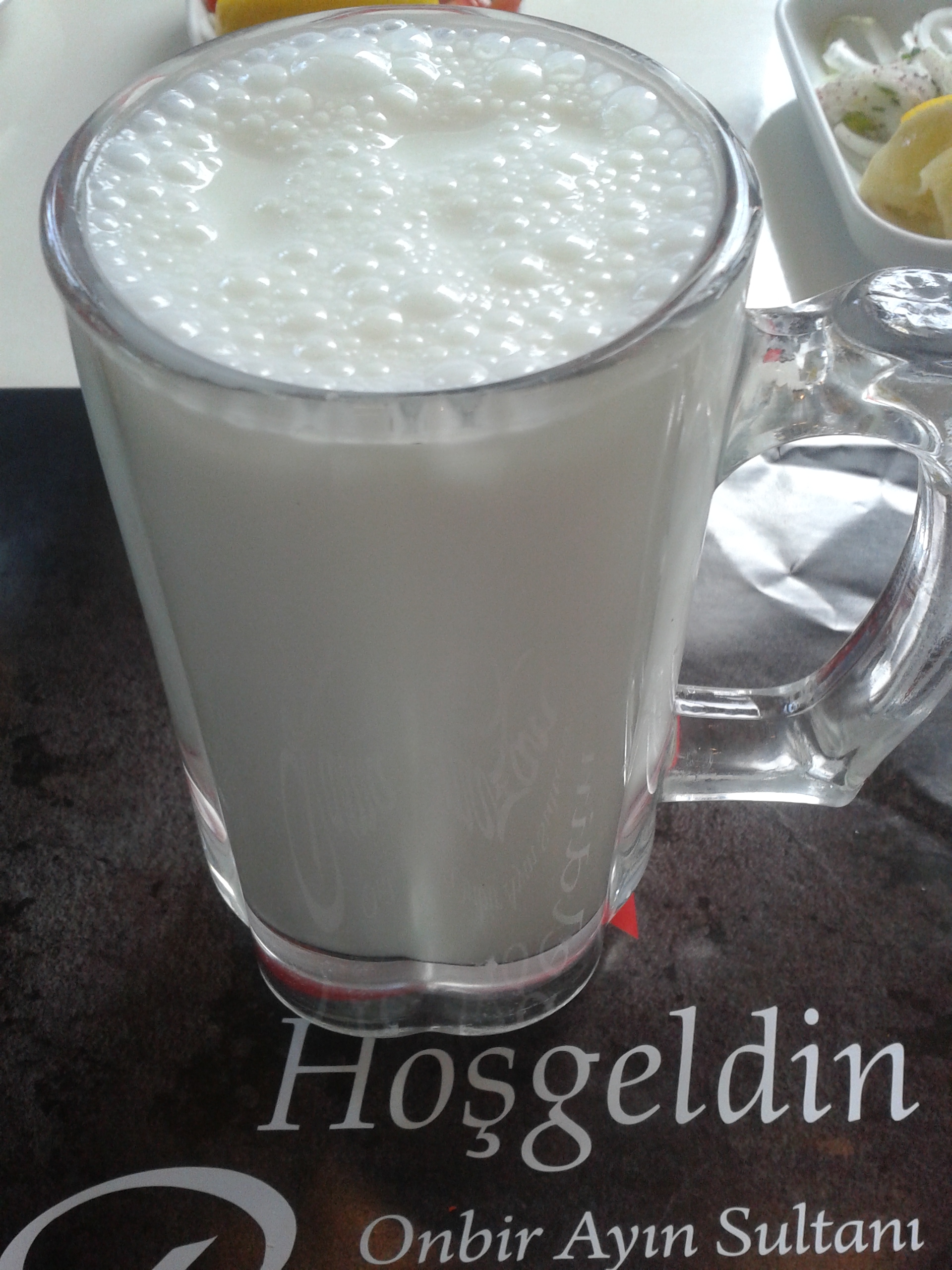
Ayran served in a glass in Ankara, Turkey

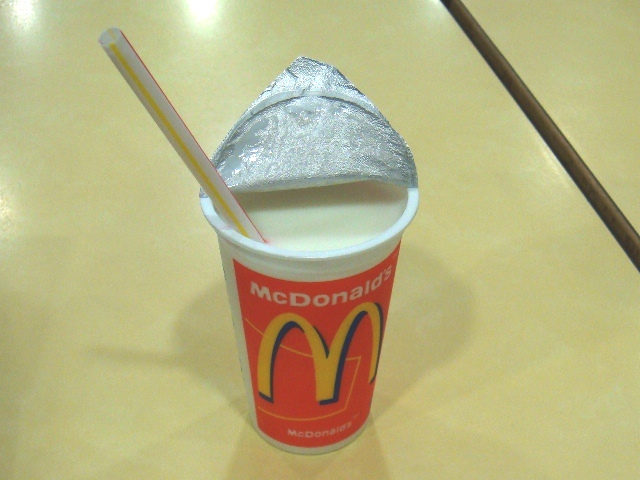
Ayran served in a McDonald's in Istanbul

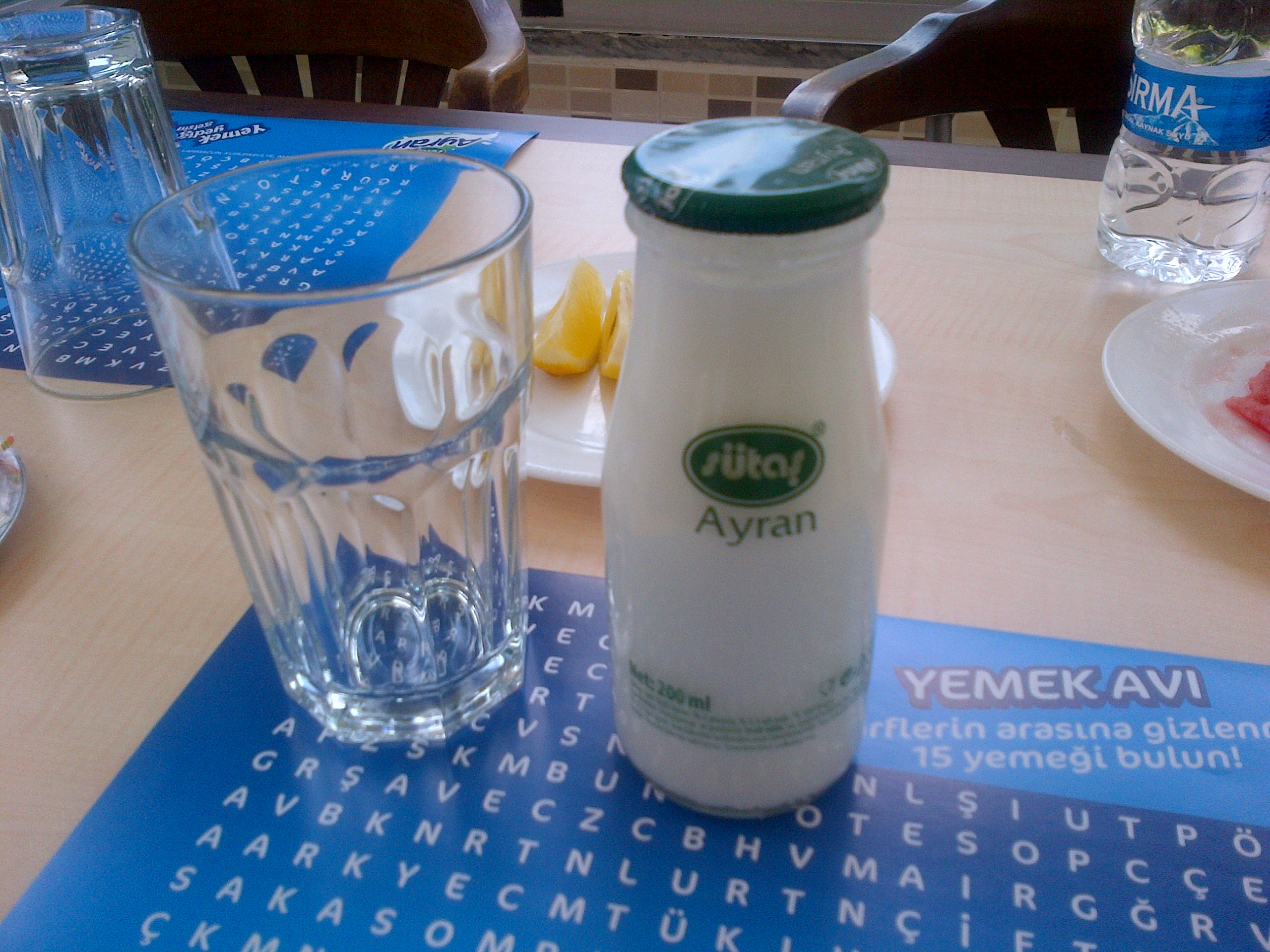
Ayran in a bottle

== See also ==
- Yayık ayranı, Turkish soured and churned yogurt-based drink
- Doogh
