= Armenian cuisine =

Culinary traditions of Armenia

Armenian cuisine (Armenian: Հայկական խոհանոց) includes the foods and cooking techniques of the Armenian people and traditional Armenian foods and drinks. The cuisine reflects the history and geography where Armenians have lived and where Armenian empires existed. The cuisine also reflects the traditional crops and animals grown and raised in Armenian-populated or controlled areas.

The preparation of meat, fish, and vegetable dishes in an Armenian kitchen often requires stuffing, frothing, and puréeing. Lamb, eggplant, and bread (lavash) are basic features of Armenian cuisine. Armenians traditionally prefer cracked wheat to maize and rice. The flavor of the food often relies on the quality and freshness of the ingredients rather than on excessive use of spices.

Fresh herbs are used extensively, both in the food and as accompaniments. Dried herbs are used in the winter when fresh herbs are not available. Wheat is the primary grain and is found in a variety of forms, such as whole wheat, shelled wheat, bulgur (parboiled cracked wheat), semolina, farina, and flour. Historically, rice was used mostly in the cities and in certain rice-growing areas (such as Marash and the region around Yerevan). Legumes are used liberally, especially chick peas, lentils, white beans, and kidney beans. Nuts are used both for texture and to add nutrition to Lenten dishes. Of primary usage are not only walnuts, almonds, and pine nuts, but also hazelnuts, pistachios (in Cilicia), and nuts from regional trees.

Fresh and dried fruit are used both as main ingredients and as sour agents. As main ingredients, the following fruits are used: apricots (fresh and dried), quince, melons, and others. As sour agents, the following fruits are used: sumac berries (in dried, powdered form), sour grapes, plums (either sour or dried), pomegranate, apricots, cherries (especially sour cherries), and lemons. In addition to grape leaves, cabbage leaves, chard, beet leaves, radish leaves, strawberry leaves, and others are also stuffed.

== Background ==
A typical meal in an Armenian household might consist of bread, butter, buttermilk, cheese, fresh and pickled vegetables, and radishes. Lunch might include a vegetable or meatball soup with sour milk.

Lamb, yogurt, eggplant and bread are basic features of the Armenian cuisine, but there are some regional differences. In Soviet cookbooks the Armenian cuisine is always stated to be the oldest of Transcaucasia and one of the oldest in all of Asia. Armenian dishes make use of cracked wheat, while Georgian variations use maize. Armenian cuisine also makes use of mixed flours made from wheat, potato and maize, which produces flavors that are difficult to replicate. Archaeologists have found traces of barley, grapes, lentils, peas, plums, sesame, and wheat during excavations of the Erebuni Fortress in Yerevan.

Herbs are used copiously in Armenian cuisine, and Armenian desserts are often flavored with rose water, orange flower water and honey. Salads are a staple of the Armenian diet, along with various yogurt soups and lamb stews, which sometimes include apricots. Pomegranate juice is a popular beverage. Murat Belge wrote that both Armenian and Iranian cuisine have meat and fruit dishes, where meat is cooked together with fruits like quince and plums, which are uncommon in Ottoman cuisine.

Mezes made with chickpeas, lentils, beans and eggplant play a role in Armenian cuisine, often served with traditional lavash bread. Lavash may also be used as a wrap for various combinations of fried meat, vegetables, cheese and herbs. Armenian cuisine also features filled pastry called boereg, various types of sausages, toasted pumpkin seeds, pistachios, pine nuts, basturma (seasoned pressed beef), and dolma.

Cinnamon is a common spice in Armenian cuisine; it is sprinkled on soups, breads, desserts and sometimes fish. Salads are served with a lemon-cinnamon dressing alongside as an accompaniment to meat kebabs. In a survey of Armenian-American cuisine, ginger was rated an important spice.

=== Sources ===
Armenians were affected by the ongoing Ottoman–Persian Wars (one text said "The whole land is enslaved by the cursed Suleyman") and produced many literary works in the 16th and 17th centuries emphasizing the Christian identity of Armenians in troubled Anatolia. Food became a central theme in this body of Armenian literature. In contrast with prohibitions in early Armenian law codes against Armenians eating or drinking with Muslims, a "sort of blasphemous" 17th century Armenian drinking song describes a feast in Van attended by Armenian priests, laymen and Turks, with the refrain repeating "Intercede to the great barrel, bountiful is its wine." The poem contains many Armenian terms for common foods. Some of the terms found in Andreas are:

- Halva
- Porak
- Paxlava
- Harisa
- Lahana
- K'ufta
- Xorovac

Ardashes H. Keoleian's Oriental Cookbook (1913), a collection of recipes from the Middle East "adapted to American tastes and methods of preparation" includes some recipes from Armenian cuisine.

Mark Zanger, a Boston-based food reporter, wrote that Armenian-American cookbook author Rose Baboian's collection of traditional Armenian recipes "stands out as a model of American ethnic food because she recorded so many traditions". She is considered to have anticipated Armenian American fusion cooking with recipes like "chocolate yogurt".

== Grains and legumes ==
Grains used in traditional Armenian cuisine included millet, wheat, barley, rye, peas and maize. Various legumes were also consumed such as lentils, chickpeas, and beans.

Grains are used for a variety of purposes: traditional lavash bread is made from wheat flour and grains are also added to soups to give them a thicker consistency. Lavash is baked in a traditional clay tonir oven. Bread is a very important staple of Armenian cuisine.

Kofta can be made with bulgur, finely chopped vegetables, herbs and often lamb. There are variations intended to be eaten cold or served hot. Sini keufteh is a dish similar to kibbeh, but layered and baked in a baking dish. The two outer layers are made with bulgur, lamb mince, onion and spices. The inner filling includes butter, onion, lamb mince, pine nuts and spices.

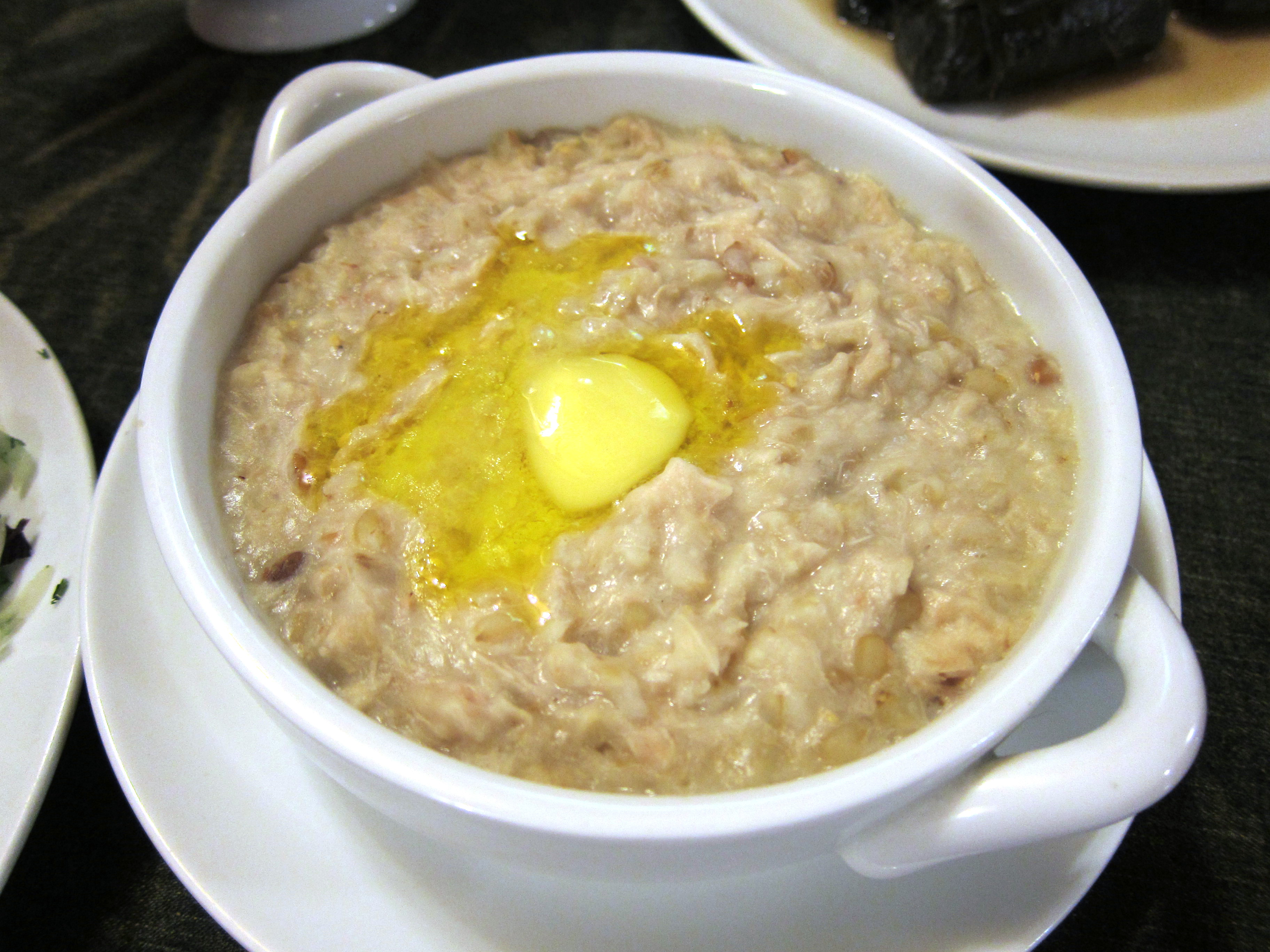
Armenian harissa

Harissa (Armenian հարիսա harisa, also known as ճիտապուր) is a thick porridge made of wheat and meat cooked together for a long time, originally in the tonir but nowadays over a stove. Ardashes Hagop Keoleian called it the "national dish" of Armenians. Traditionally, harissa was prepared on feast days in communal pots. The wheat used in harissa is typically shelled (pelted) wheat, though in Adana, harissa is made with կորկոտ (korkot; ground, par-boiled shelled wheat). Harissa can be made with lamb, beef, or chicken. A small piece of butter is often put on top of the harissa.

A common dish of Armenian cuisine is pilaf (եղինձ; yeghints). Pilaf is a seasoned rice, bulgur, or shelled wheat dish often served with meats such as lamb or beef. Armenian recipes may combine vermicelli or orzo with rice cooked in stock seasoned with mint, parsley and allspice. One traditional Armenian pilaf is made with the same noodle rice mixture cooked in stock with raisins, almonds and allspice. Armenian rices are discussed by Rose Baboian in her cookbook from 1964 which includes recipes for different pilafs, most rooted in her birthplace of Aintab in Turkey. Baboian recommends that the noodles be stir-fried first in chicken fat before being added to the pilaf. Another Armenian cookbook written by Vağinag Pürad recommends to render poultry fat in the oven with red pepper until the fat mixture turns a red color before using the strained fat to prepare pilaf. Pilaf made with bulgur and liver is a specialty of Zeytun (present day Süleymanlı).

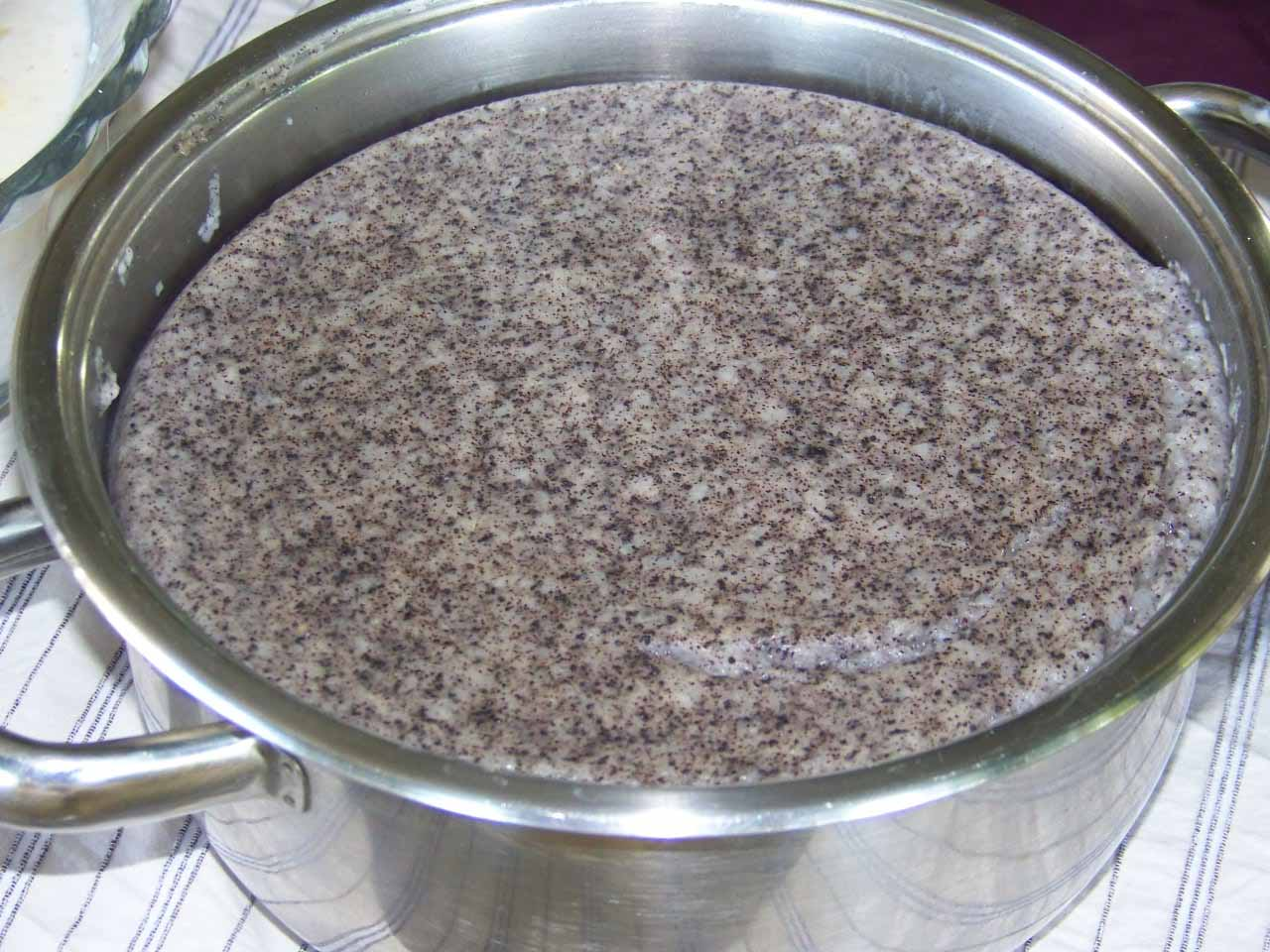
Lapa prepared with poppyseeds.

Lapa is a kind of savory rice porridge or gruel eaten in Armenia, but it also is an Armenian word with several meanings. One is "watery boiled rice, thick rice soup, mush"; lepe refers to various rice dishes differing by region. Antranig Azhderian describes Armenian pilaf as a "dish resembling porridge".

In Agn (present-day Kemaliye) a thin flatbread called loshig was baked and dried. It was soaked again before being eaten. Badjoug was a pastry of fat and flour stamped with designs and sent as a wedding invitation. Glodj was unleavened bread made for Lent and klrdig was a bread made of semolina.

== Herbs, spices and sauces ==
Armenians make extensive use of various herbs in their dishes. One porridge prepared from cereals and wild herbs is called kerchik. (The same name is used by Yazidis.) Armenians usually eat kerchik with pickled cabbage, whereas Yazidis eat it with knotgrass (Polygonum aviculare). The Eastern Anatolia region, where many Armenians lived prior to the Armenian genocide, has rich plant biodiversity with over 3,000 vascular plant taxa—of these almost 800 are endemic species. The inhabitants of this region often lived in inaccessible areas and were dependent on local cultivated and wild flora. Some of the most important areas of the region, in terms of plant diversity, include Harput, Lake Hazar and Munzur.

In Armenia there are more than 3,600 wild plant species. Those include stinging nettle (mostly used for tea), asparagus and mallow an herb that formed the original basis for marshmallows.

Commonly used spices include black pepper, sumac, cumin, caraway, cardamom, mahleb, clove, anise, curcuma, fennel, fenugreek, blue fenugreek, allspice, ziziphora, saffron, paprika, cayenne, and cinnamon. Some greens were dried and used to season cooking including garlic, spinach, parsley, mint, coriander, dill, summer savory, thyme, tarragon, leek, chive, celery, marjoram, bay leaves, and basil. Red pepper pulp was dried in the sun. Sprigs of terebinth were dried and infused in a mixture of water, olive oil and brine, then toasted and ground. The ground terebinth was added as a seasoning for eetch, tabouleh, and baked breads.

The Armenian spice mix cemen (Armenian: չաման) consists of caraway, paprika, blue fenugreek, fenugreek, black pepper, allspice, cumin, garlic, salt, and sometimes cayenne. When used as a marinade (mostly for basturma), the spice blend is added to tomato paste, parsley, crushed garlic cloves, and either olive oil or matzoon. A sweet Armenian “spice mix” called khoritz, which is used to prepare Armenian desserts like gata and nazook, is made of sugar, flour, and butter. In some variations walnuts are added.

One Armenian sauce that is also the base of some Armenian dishes is lecho (Armenian: լեչո). It is made with tomato, peppers/paprika, parsley and salt, and it is usually served hot. Red jajek (Armenian: կարմիր ջաջիկ), also called matsnaprtosh (Armenian: մածնաբրդոշ matsnaprt'oš) in Artsakh, is a yogurt sauce made with matzoon, sour cream, red beet, onion, garlic, cucumber(optional), black pepper, dill, and coriander. Matzoon alone can also be used as a sauce, and spices and herbs are often added to it then. Other popular sauces used in Armenian cuisine include ajika and jajek.

== Dairy and cheese ==
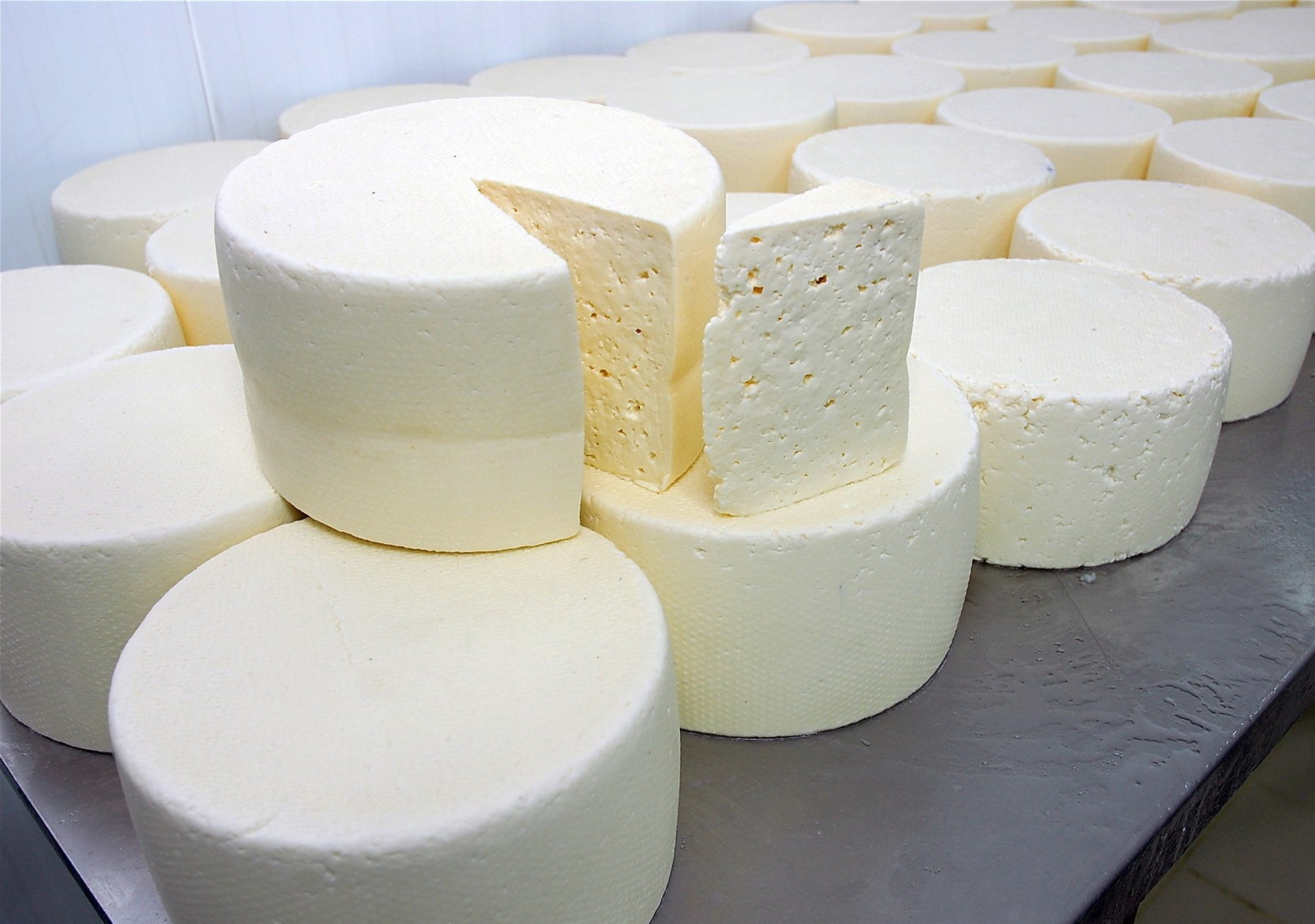
Armenian lori cheese

Typical dairy items in Armenian cuisine include matzoon, strained yogurt, butter, cream, and cheese.

Cheese is a staple of Armenian cuisine and traditionally was eaten daily. The process of making Armenian lori cheese begins by boiling, similar to halloumi cheese. It is preserved in a brine solution. Armenian-American cookbook author Rose Baboian said that Armenian cheesemaking techniques date back to an era before refrigeration was widely available so cheeses had to be preserved in brine solution. Chechil is a type of smoked Armenian string cheese. Yeghegnadzor is an Armenian steamed cheese made from pasteurized cows' or goats' milk that is mixed with local greens, stored in clay pots, then buried in the mountains and left to mature for at least six months before consumption. The texture is semi-soft and crumbly. Chanakh is Armenian soft cheese that is soaked in pots and filled with brine. Its texture is slightly brittle. Motal is a white goat cheese flavored with wild herbs. Motal is prepared in locally made terra cotta pots sealed with beeswax, a method that dates back at least 5,000 years.

In Musa Dagh, traditional cheese was made from curds called choukalig. Gij or kebdzoudz baneyr was salted and dried thyme combined with curds and preserved in a jug. Sourki cheese was a mixture of spices and curds shaped as a pyramid, dried, and stored in glass until it began to turn moldy. Khiroubaneyr was made by adding yogurt water to milk.

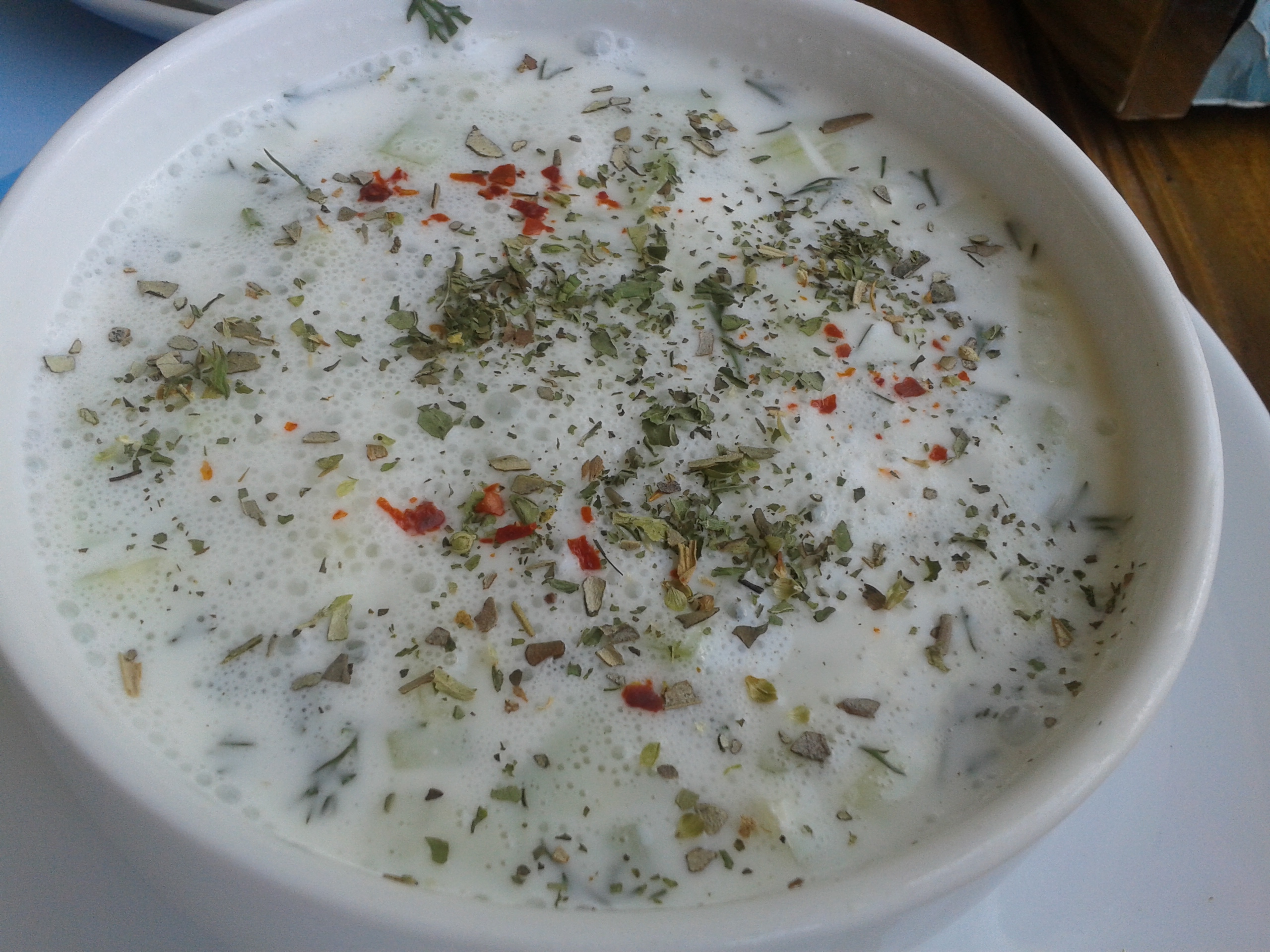
A bowl of jajek with spices

Matzoon (Armenian: մածուն, matsun) and other yogurt-derived products are of particular importance in the cuisine. Tahn (similar to ayran in Turkey) is a yogurt based drink made by mixing yogurt with water and salt (Baboian's recipe also includes sugar). This may have originated as a way of preserving yogurt by the addition of salt. Tan is the traditional Armenian name for strained yogurt. Strained yogurt that was boiled with water until completely solid was called yepadz madzoun (cooked yogurt) and it could be stored for use in winter soups. Butter was made by beating matzoon in a churn.

Baboian gives several different recipes that can be prepared with madzoon like barley matsoon soup, jajek (which she calls Easter Spinach Salad) and sauce served with koftas. She has also a matsoon spice cake with cinnamon, nutmeg and cloves served with coconut and walnut topping. Her recipe for fruitcake, also made with yogurt, includes dried fruits, nuts, baking spices and assorted candied fruits.

Baboian's recipes were published before yogurt was widely available in American shops, so her recipe collection included instructions for preparing yogurt at home from fresh milk when it was published. In the 1950s, Sarkis Colombosian, an Armenian who had fled Turkey in 1917, began selling yogurt from an Andover, Massachusetts based dairy farm, which he purchased during the Great Depression. The family made the yogurt themselves and also made tan. Armenian merchants in Watertown, Massachusetts began ordering yogurt, labneh and string cheese from Colombo Yogurt, and the product eventually made it on to supermarket shelves.

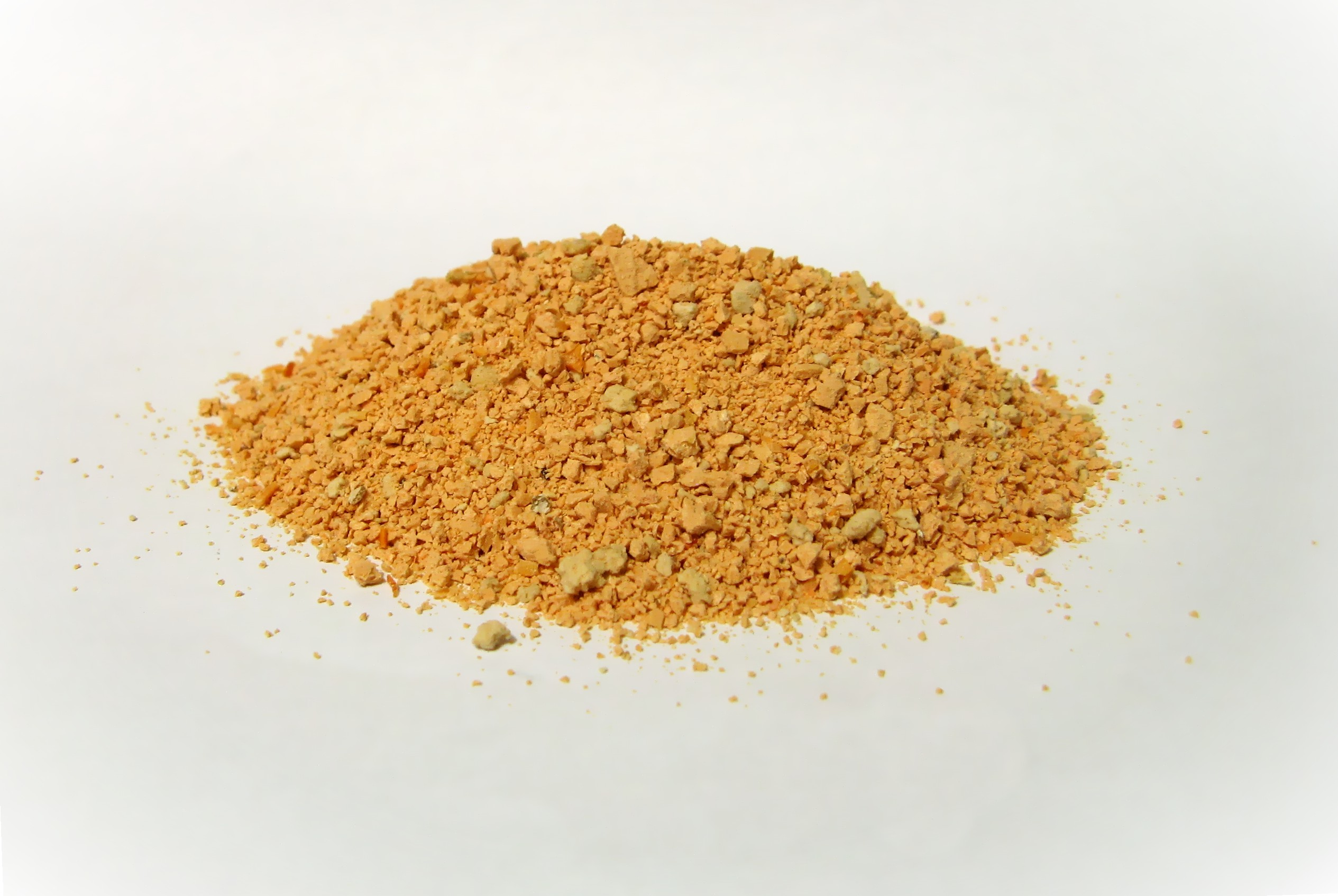
Tarhana

Tarhana is a mixture of yogurt and bulgur wheat. The yogurt and bulgur are combined and left on a tray until the grains absorb the yogurt. Once the liquid is absorbed, the grain is placed in the sun to dry and then rubbed into a powder. This powder can be used to thicken soups or stews. Traditionally, it was stored in cloth bags. Three types of tarhana are known from Agn (present-day Kemaliye): the commonly known tahneh tarhana made from milled bulgur and ayran, chreh tarhana from bulgur and water (for Lent) and shira tarhana with bulgur and grape juice. According to Stanley Kerr, a staff member at the Near East Relief orphanage for Armenian children, when the massacres began during the Battle of Marash Armenians sheltering at a soap factory sustained themselves on stores that included tarhana, dried fruits and olive oil.

== Fruits and other sweets ==
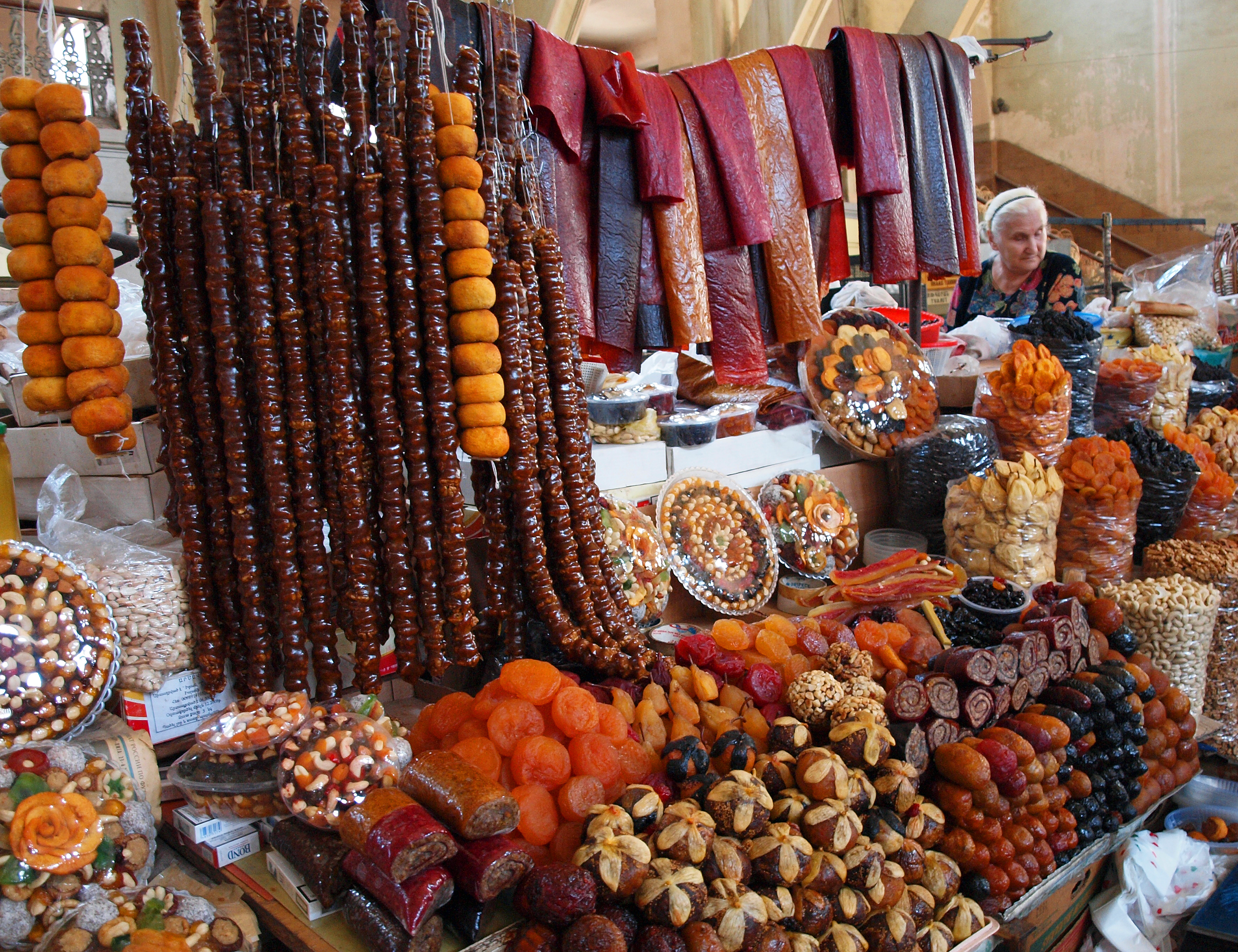
Pestil/bastegh is an Armenian flat fruit leather, here seen sold alongside other dried fruit products at a market in Yerevan

The main ingredients in Armenian sweets are honey, fruits, nuts, yogurt and sesame. Both dried and fresh fruits are used. There are many fruit-based Armenian desserts including smoked peaches and nuts cooked in honey and various fruit compotes. Sweet sujukh (called churchkhela in Georgia) are nuts that are coated in fruit must, or juice. Matzoon, and nuts, that are sweetened with honey, are a popular dessert in Armenia. Cinnamon is heavily used as spice for desserts like apricot compote, and kurabiye (a type of cookie).

The apricot species Prunus armeniaca is named after Armenia. The scientific name armeniaca was first used by Gaspard Bauhin in his Pinax Theatri Botanici(page 442), referring to the species as Mala armeniaca "Armenian apple". It is sometimes stated that this came from Pliny the Elder, but it was not used by Pliny. Linnaeus took up Bauhin's epithet in the first edition of his Species Plantarum in 1753. Armenian and Persian peaches were reportedly traded westward during the era of Alexander the Great. One Soviet-era writer reports that Armenia's apricots, peaches, walnuts and quince are "equal or superior to the world's best grades". Another writes "Armenian peaches are famous, and her brandies are popular throughout the world". Grapes, figs, and pomegranates are also popular. Grapes and apricots are commonly used to make bastegh (Armenian: պաստեղ), a dried "fruit leather" that resembles Fruit Roll-Ups. Alani (ալանի) are pitted dried fruits stuffed with ground walnuts and sugar.

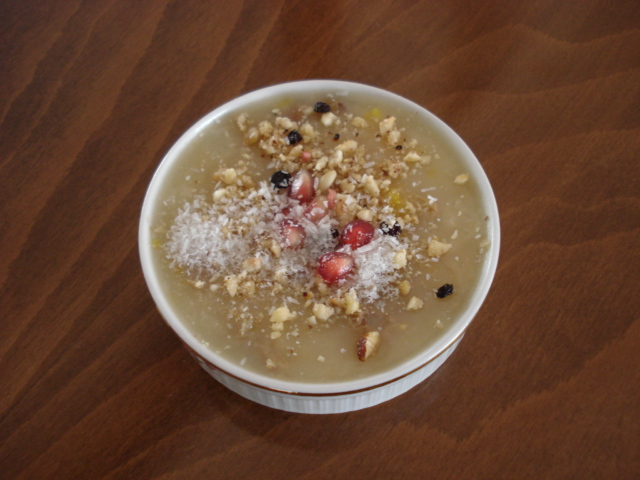
Anoushabour, also called "Armenian Christmas pudding" and "Noah's pudding"

The Armenian version of the grain pudding ashure is called anoushabour (Armenian: անուշապուր). Since Armenians serve this pudding during Christmas and on New Year's Eve, it is sometimes called "Armenian Christmas Pudding". The pudding may be accompanied by kurabiye or nuts such as almonds and pistachios. Like ashure, the Christmas Pudding may be garnished with pomegranate seeds and flavored with rose water, and shared with neighbors during the Christmas season. This festive pudding is the centerpiece of the New Year's table, which is often decorated with dried fruits, nuts and pomegranates.

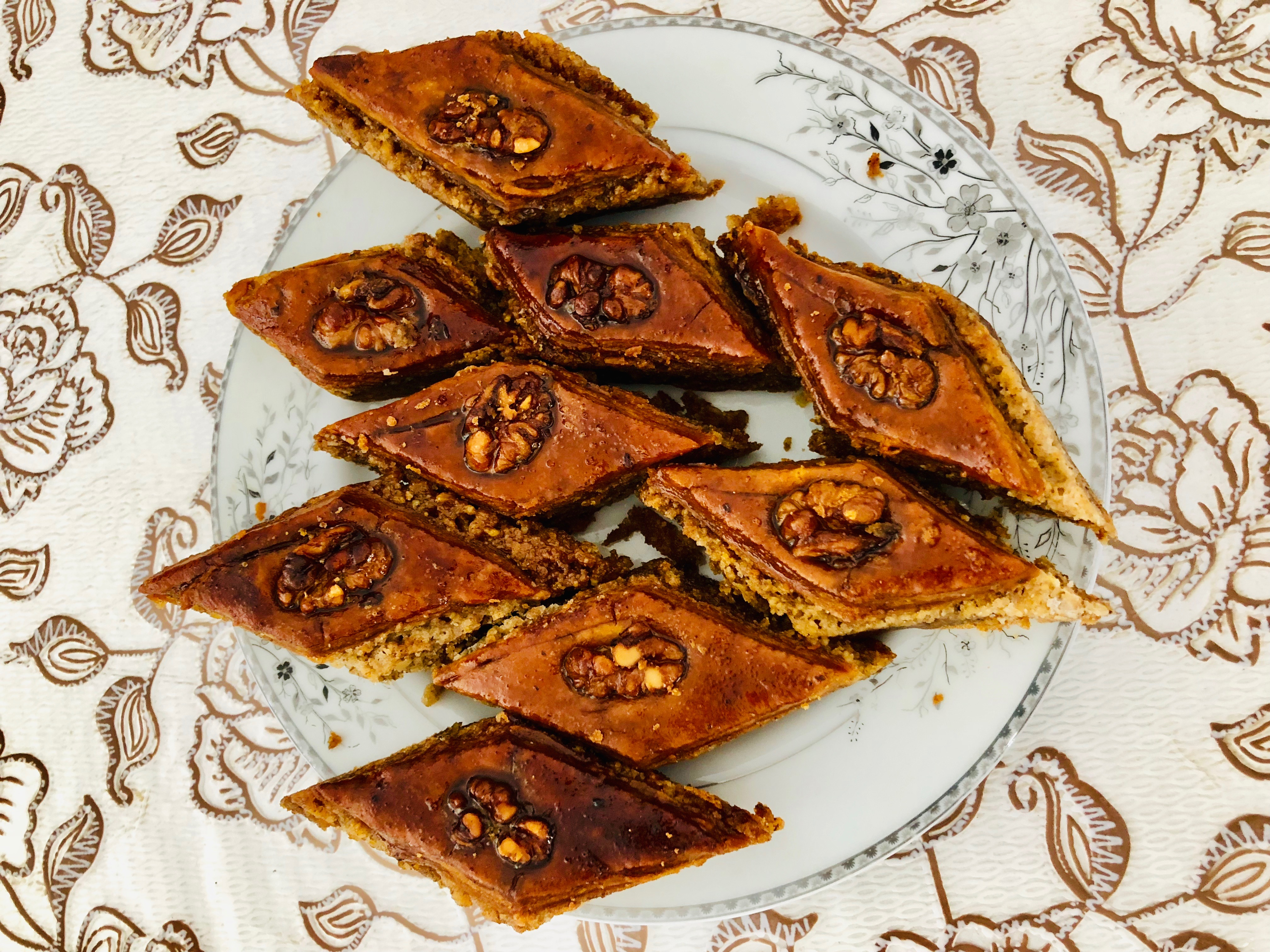
Armenian pakhlava

Armenian baklava, known in Armenian as pakhlava (Armenian: Փախլավա), is made of layers of phyllo dough, a filling of cinnamon-spiced chopped walnuts, and a syrup made from cloves, cinnamon, lemon juice, sugar and water. It is diamond-shaped and often has either one hazelnut, almond, or half a walnut placed on each piece. It is often served at special occasions like Armenian christmas or Armenian eastern. Armenian baklava has some variations on how many phyllo layers are supposed to be used. One variation uses 40 sheets of dough to align with the 40 days of Lent Jesus spent in the desert. Another variation is similar to the Greek style of baklava, which is supposed to be made with 33 dough layers, referring to the years of Jesus's life. The city of Gavar makes Its own version of baklava. It is made with 25 dough layers, has a filling of cleaned and dried chopped walnuts, sugar and a syrup that is poured over the finished baklava consisting of honey and flowers. This type of baklava used to be prepared in the then-Armenian city of Bayazet, but the people living there immigrated to Gavar and surrounding regions in 1830. Armenians say the name of the pastry, which they call paklava, derives from the Armenian word bakh (Lent) and helvah ("sweet").

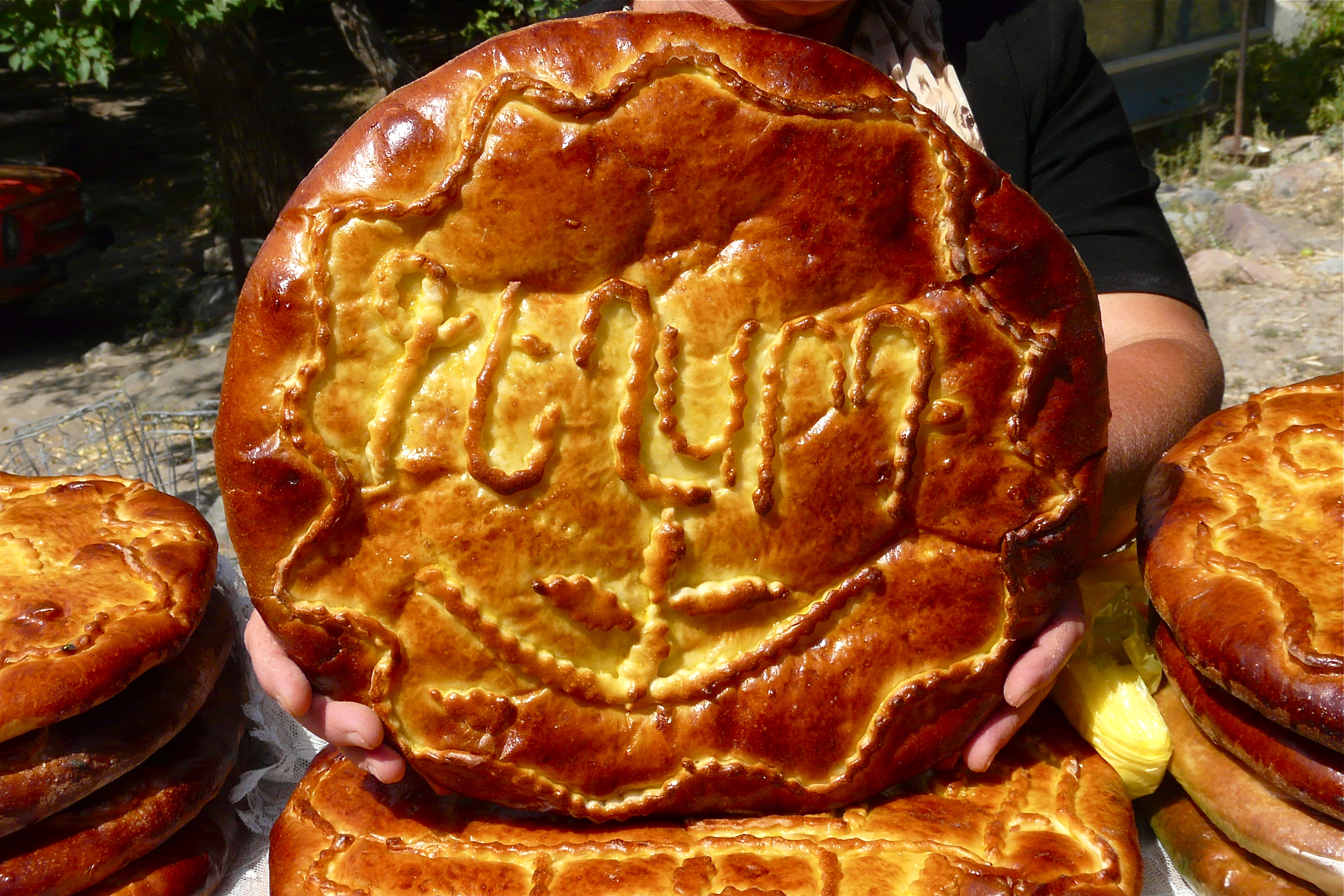
Armenian decorated Gata

Gata (Armenian: գաթա) is an Armenian pastry or sweet bread. There are many variations of gata in Armenia. One popular variety of it is koritz (khoriz), a filling that consists of flour, butter and sugar. Gata can have other fillings such as nuts, most commonly walnuts.

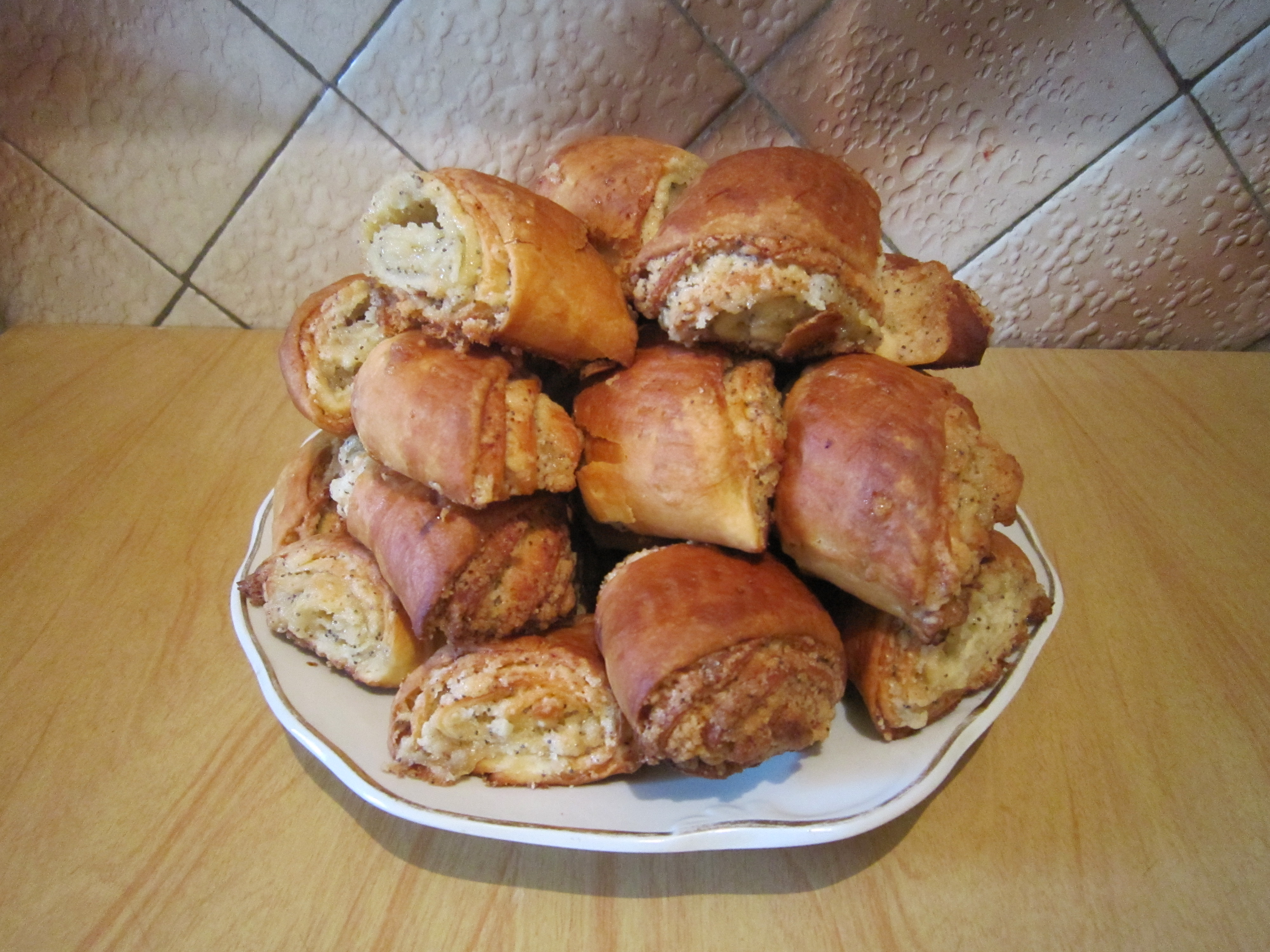
Armenian Nazook

Nazook (Armenian: նազուկ) is a rolled Armenian pastry made from flour, butter, sugar, sour cream, yeast, vanilla extract and eggs, with a filling (khoriz) made with sugar, flour, butter, and nuts, especially walnuts.

Cigarette cookies (Armenian: սիգարետ թխվածքաբլիթներ) are soft cookies that are rolled into the form of a cigarette. They are filled with either lokhum, a mixture of sugar, cardamom, and walnuts, or a combination of both. The dough mainly consists of matzoon, butter, eggs, and flour. When finished the pastry gets dusted with powdered sugar.

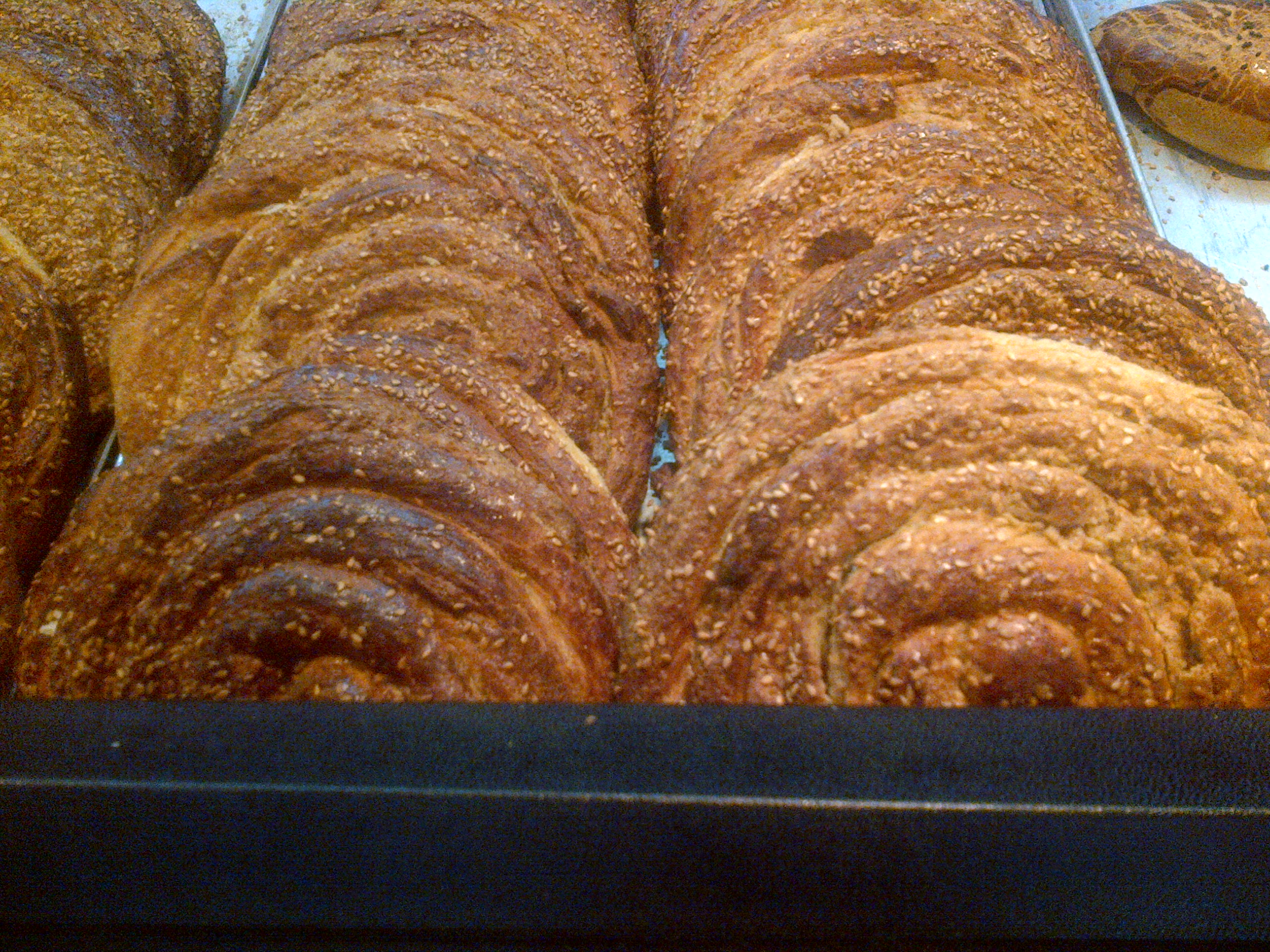
Multiple Tahini rolls

Tahini rolls (Armenian: թահինի հաց) are made by rolling dough out, spreading it with a mixture of tahini, cinnamon and sugar. After that it is rolled into a cylinder. The dough is then sliced into smaller pieces and rolled up to form a circle.

The Mikado cake (Armenian: միկադո տորթ) is an Armenian layer cake made by stacking up layers of baked dough (the dough mainly consists of flour, sour cream, butter, and egg) and a buttercream that mainly consists of butter, chocolate, brandy and condensed milk on top of each other. When finished the cake gets covered in the aforementioned buttercream, and shreds of chocolate, or leftover dough-crumbles.

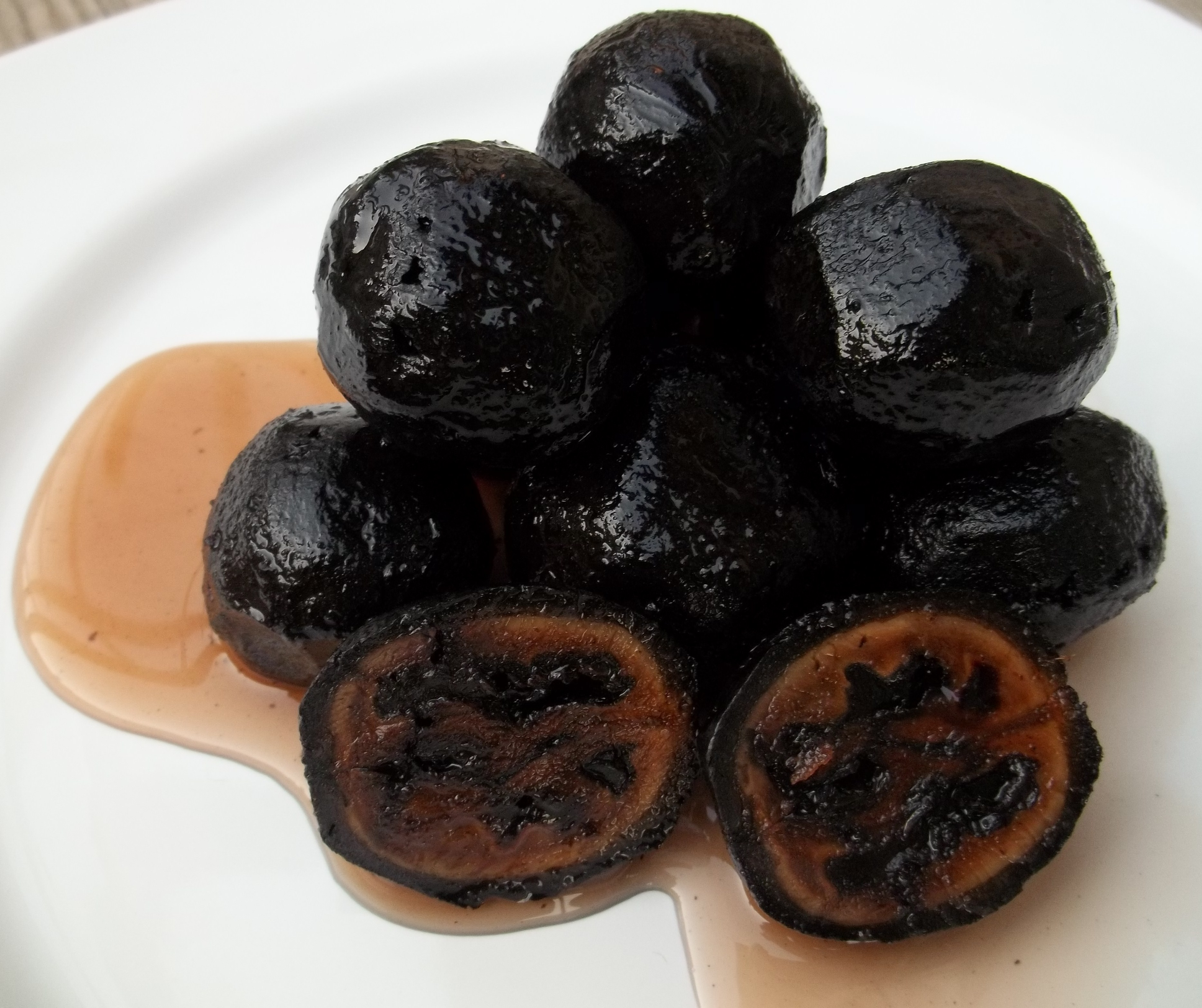
Walnut Murabba

Murabba (Armenian: մուրաբա) is a sweet fruit, and nut preserve. It is usually prepared with fruit, sugar, and spices. A unique variation only found in Armenia is pumpkin murabba. These fruit preserves often accompany beverages, like tea.

== Meats ==
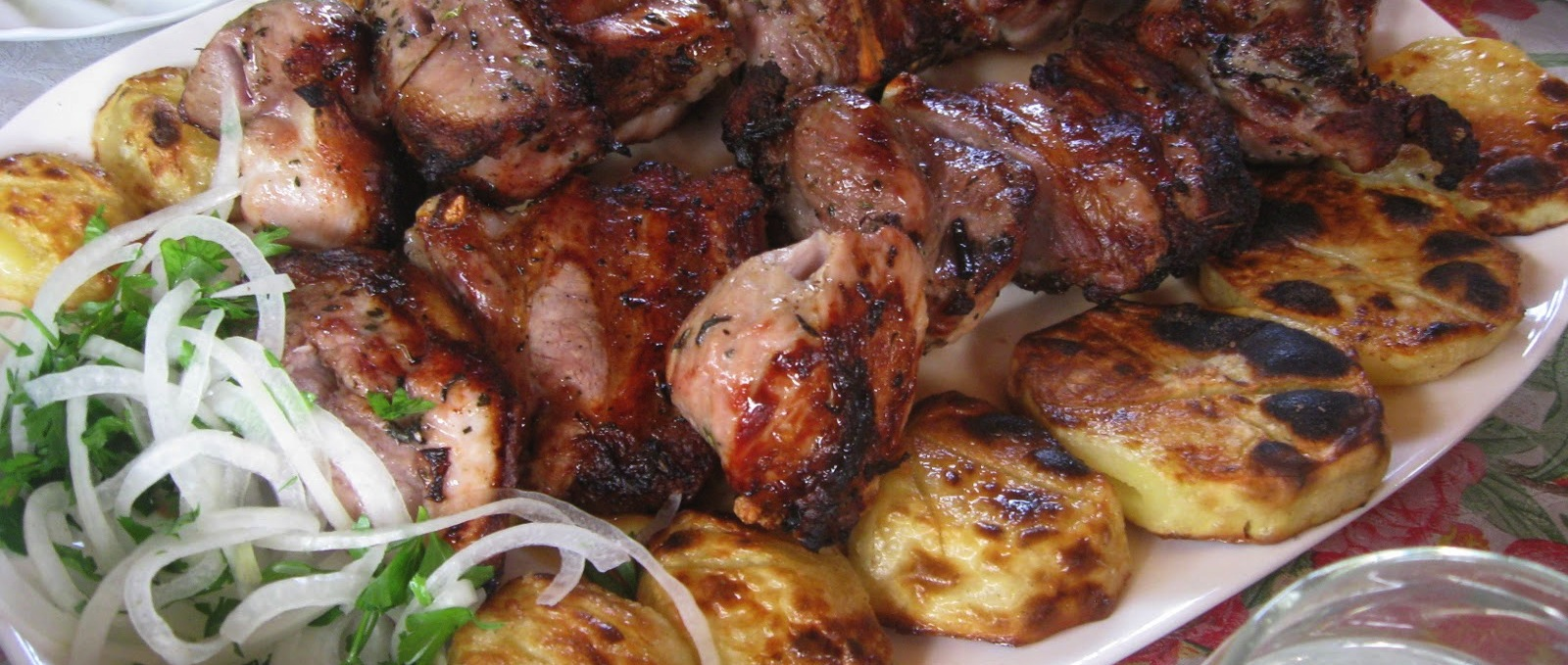
Khorovats

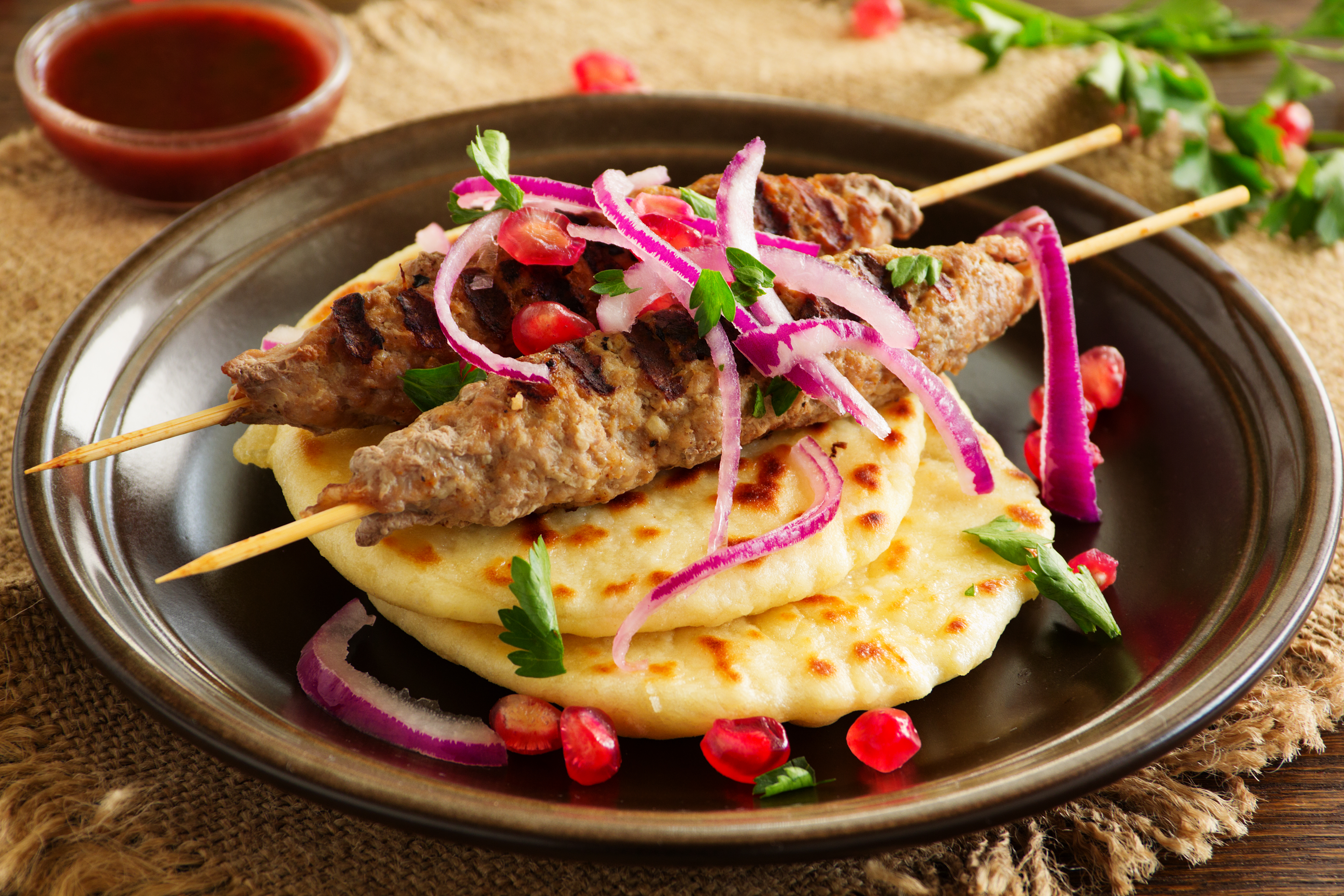
Lula kebab

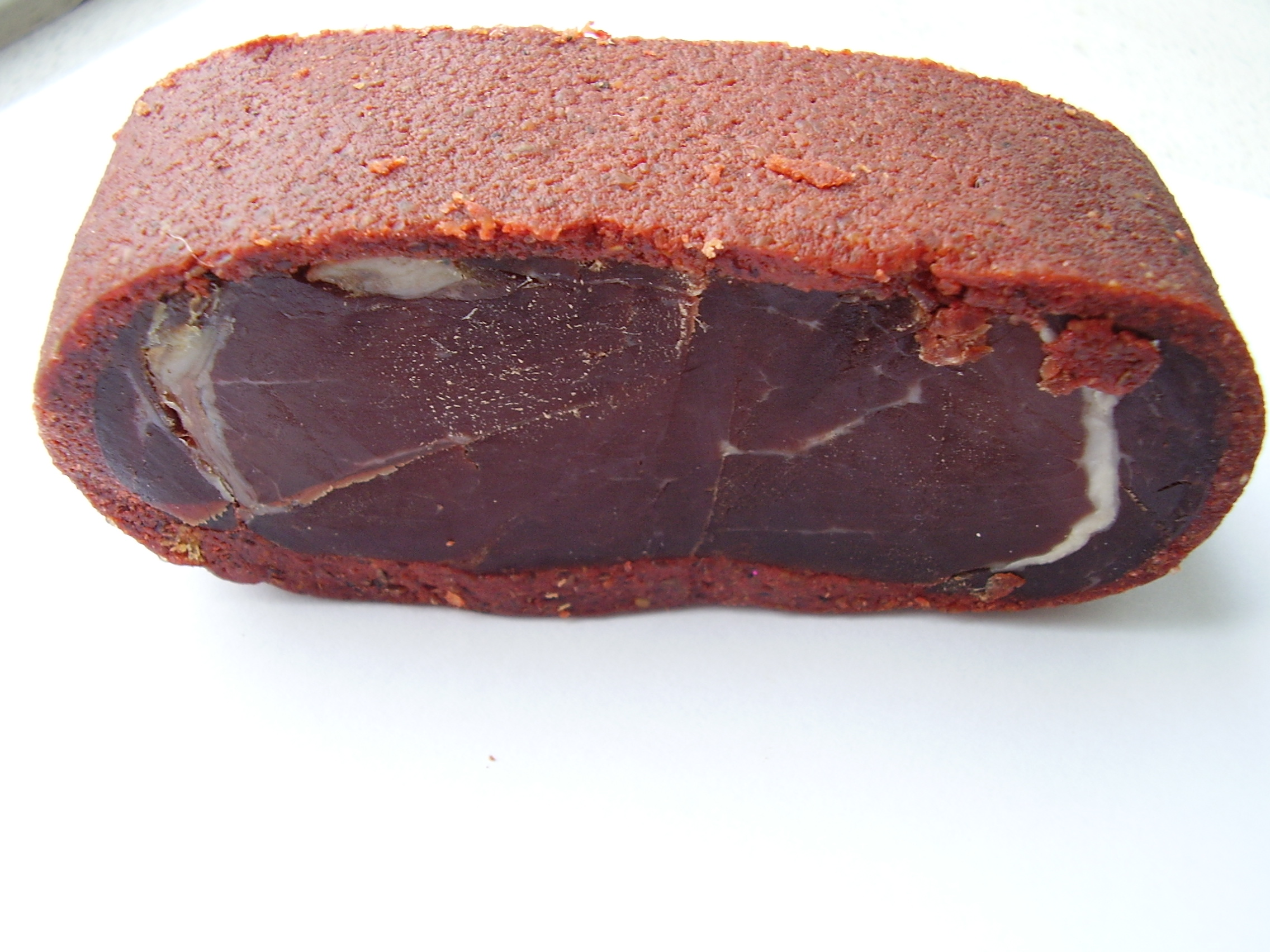
Basturma/Aboukh

Grilled meats are quite common as well and are omnipresent at market stalls, where they are eaten as fast food, as well as at barbecues and picnic. Also, in modern times, no Armenian banquet is considered complete without an entree of grilled meat. Grilled meats vary from the simple (marinated meat on a skewer interspersed with vegetables like eggplant) to the more elaborate. Certain regions in Eastern and Western Armenia developed their own variations of grilled meat. Armenians eat various meats like mutton, beef and goat but the most popular meat in Armenian cuisine is pork. Sixteenth- and seventeenth-century Armenian writers in Ottoman Anatolia considered eating pork an important marker of Christian identity. An Armenian priest writing in the sixteenth century concluded, "If we didn't eat the meat of the pig, then we wouldn't be Christian."

Roasted piglet, called gochi, is a traditional holiday meal prepared for New Year's celebrations. Roasted pork chops (chalagach) are a favored item for barbeques.

Khorovats (Armenian: խորոված) is an Armenian-style barbecue that is usually made from pork, but can also be made with lamb. This dish is prepared with vegetables like eggplant, tomato and green pepper. It is made on skewers and cooked in a tonir. Lula kebab (Armenian: լուլա քյաբաբ) is a type of kebab cooked on skewers. It is made from minced meat that is spiced with onion, tail fat, salt, black pepper, and sumac. It is usually served with lavash, grilled onions, and pomegranates.

Dolma (Armenian: տոլմա) and stuffed eggplant (Armenian: լցոնած սմբուկներ) dishes are widespread in Armenia. Dolma is usually made with either stuffing wine leaves, cabbage, eggplants, peppers, or other vegetables with a mixture of spiced ground beef and rice. There is a Dolma festival in Armenia that appreciates the art of tolma-making in Armenia.

Basturma (Armenian: բաստուրմա) is a salted meat that is dried, and cured, before being rubbed with a special spice-paste called cemen (See: Herbs, spices and sauces section of this article). It is a common food item in Armenia. According to some sources, the first recorded mention of Basturma was between 95-45 BC in Armenia during the reign of Tigranes the Great, where it was known as aboukh (Armenian: աբուխ). The word abookhd (Classical Armenian: apukht) was already used in the Armenian translation of the Bible, in the fifth century AD, meaning “salted and dried meat”. While others say that the basturma we know today was invented in the Armenian Kingdom of Cilicia.

Other Armenian meat-based dishes:

- Yershig (Armenian: երշիկ yershik or սուջուխ suǰux) – a spicy beef sausage that is dried, and cured. Other than the Turkish version of sujuk, it is a lot denser and spicier. This sausage is mostly served as a cold cut, but it can also be fried.
- Kiufta (Armenian: կոլոլակ kololak) – meaning meatball comes in many types, such as Hayastan kiufta, Kharpert kiufta (Porov kiufta), Ishli kiufta, etc.
- Keshkegh (Armenian: Քեշքեղ) is a bulgur pilav-based dish with lamb or chicken; it is cooked in a broth and flavored with butter, cinnamon and pepper.
- Tjvjik (Armenian: տժվժիկ) is an Armenian dish which is mainly based on liver (lamb, beef, pork or chicken). In addition to liver it can include any other offal.
- Khashlama (Armenian: Խաշլամա) is a traditional Armenian vegetable and lamb stew. It is usually cooked over a tonir, and when finished eaten together with lavash.
- Urfa kebab (Armenian: Կոլոլակ Ուրֆայից, lit. 'Meatballs from Urfa'), is spiced minced meat interspersed with eggplant slices.
- Orukh (Armenian: օրուխ) and Khanum budu (Armenian: Խանում բուդու), are two Cilician specialties. These fried patties are usually made with a combination of rice, ground meat, eggs, parsley, oil, salt, and black pepper. They are cooked on skewers.

== Doughs ==
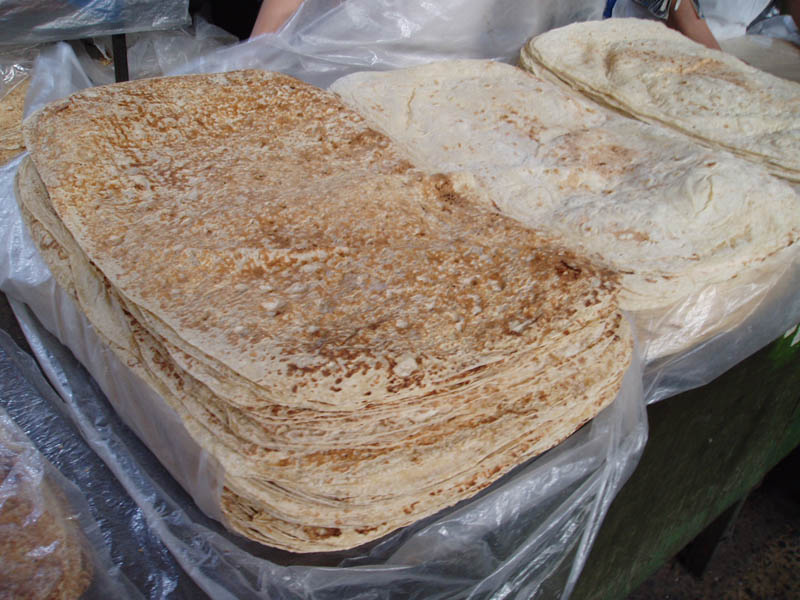
Lavash from Yerevan

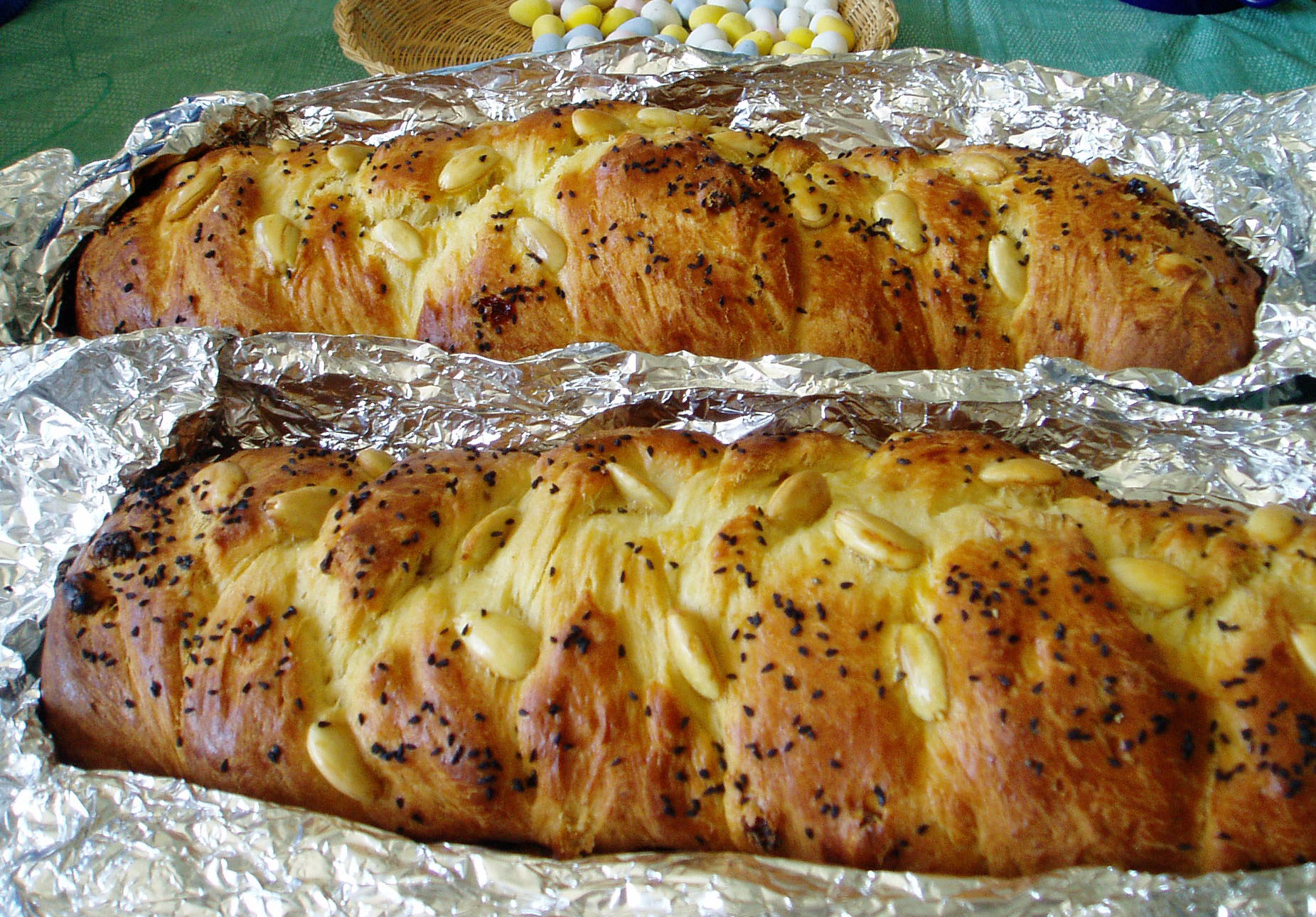
Choreg/bsatir at an Armenian Easter celebration

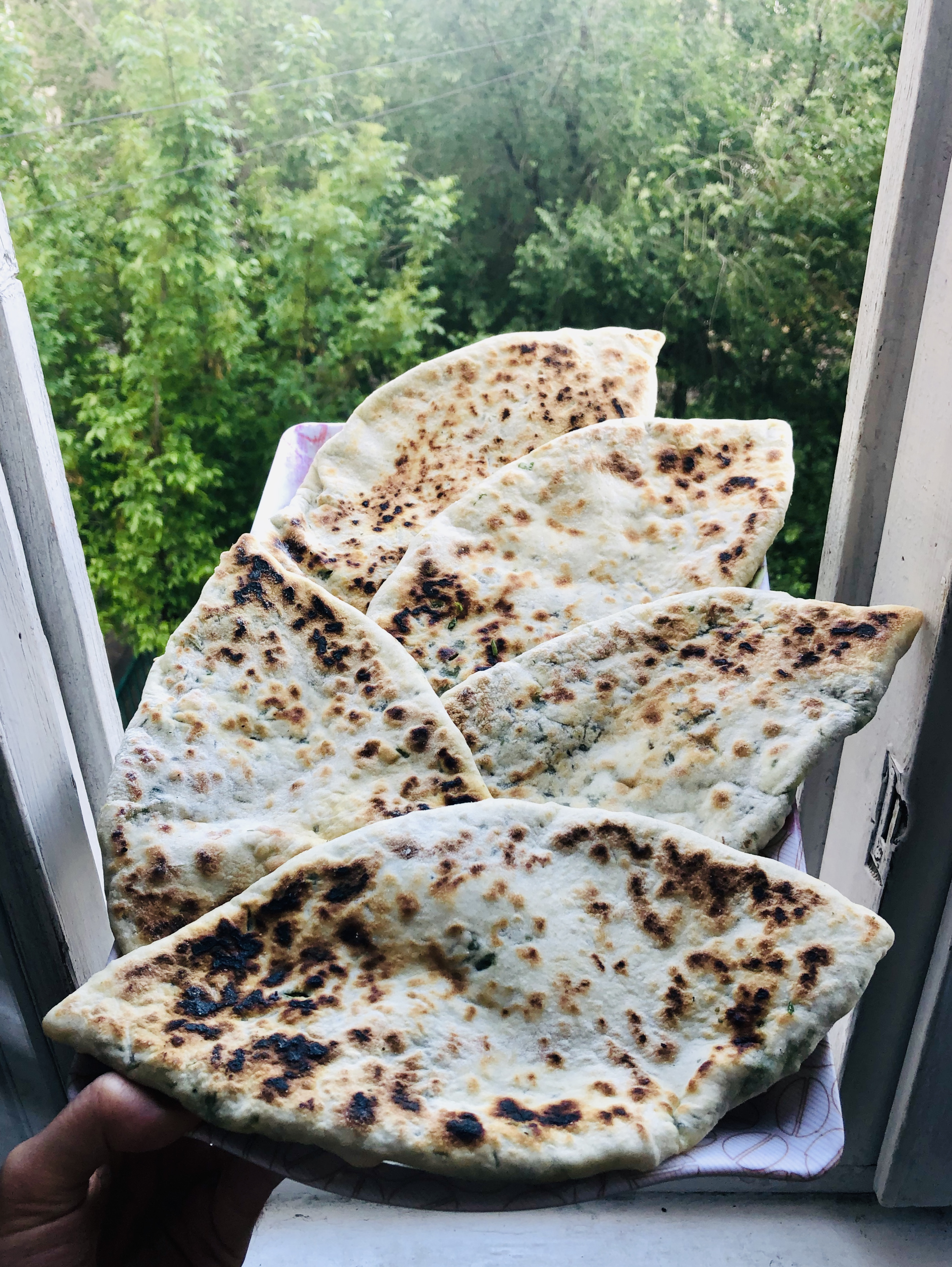
Zhingyalov hats

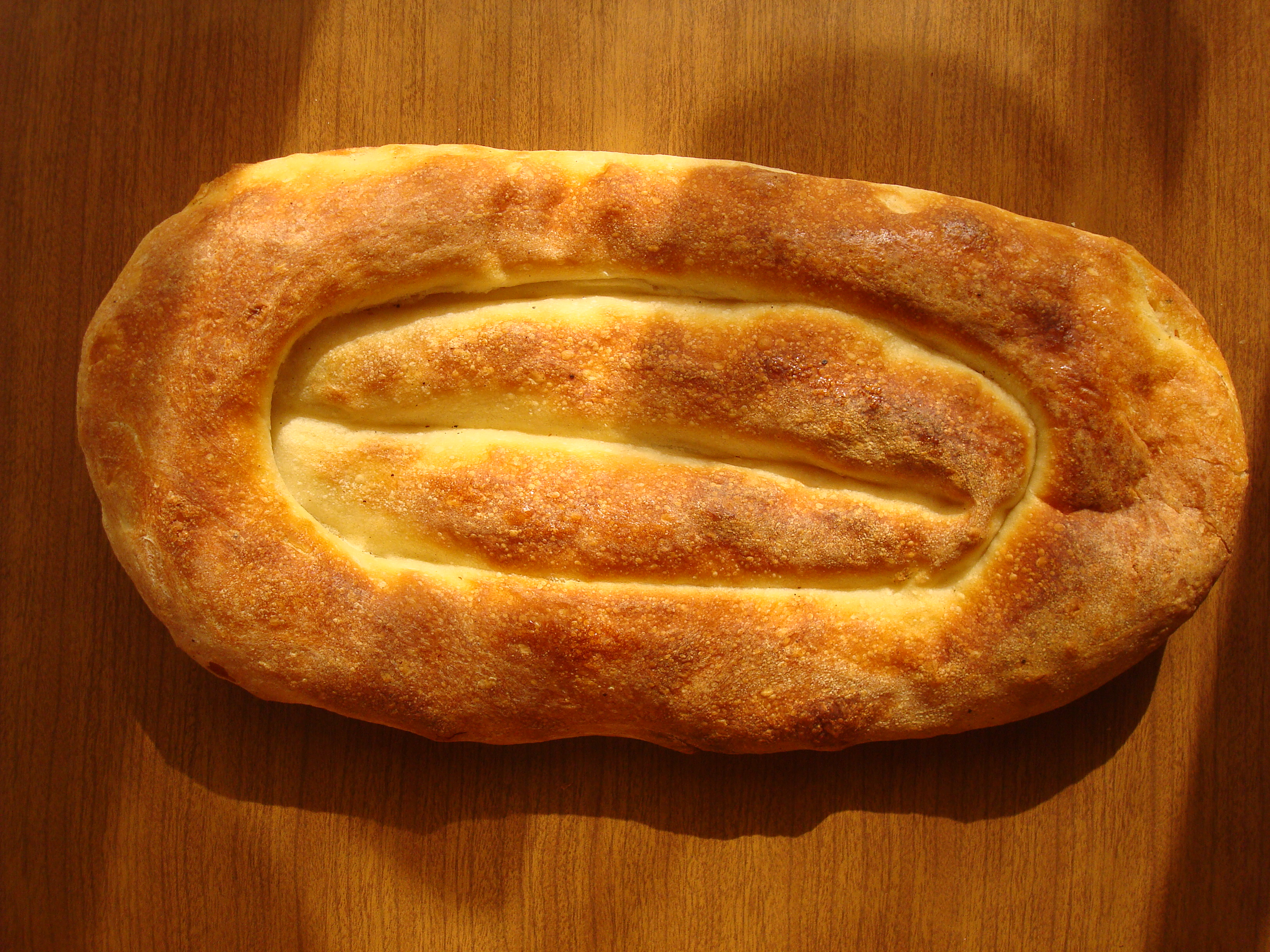
Matnakash

- Matnakash (Armenian: մատնաքաշ matnak’aš) – is a soft and puffy leavened bread, made of wheat flour and shaped into oval or round loaves; the characteristic golden or golden-brown crust is achieved by coating the surface of the loaves with sweetened tea essence before baking.
- Lavash (Armenian: լավաշ) - is a thin flatbread usually leavened and traditionally baked in a tonir.
- Bagharch (Armenian: բաղարջ) – sweet ritual bread prepared for New Year's Eve, Mid-Lent, etc. It usually has a pattern on its top.
- Choereg or bsatir (Armenian: չորեկ, բսատիր) – braided bread formed into rolls or loaves, also a traditional loaf for Easter.
- Nshkhar (Armenian: նշխար nšxar) is the communion bread used during mass (Badarak) in the Armenian Church. It always has a religious (Christian) image printed on top of it.
- Zhingyalov hats (Armenian: Ժինգյալով հաց) – Zhingyalov hats are flatbreads filled with seven different greens which include spinach, coriander, parsley, basil, scallions, dill, and mint. There is a variety of combinations that can be used in the bread and these greens can also be substituted for other greens. The greens are placed in the bread, and then the bread is folded like a into the shape of a boat. After that it is cooked and then eaten.
- Semsek (Armenian: սեմսեկ) - is an Armenian dish made with a smooth dough that is topped with mixture of minced meat, herbs, and spices.

== Breakfast ==
Traditional Armenian breakfast dishes include:

- Khash, sometimes colloquially called the "Armenian hangover cure", is a basic dish of simmered cow's hooves. Khash is mentioned in 12th century medieval Armenian texts.
- Byoreks (Armenian: բյորեկ), are pies made with phyllo pastry and stuffed with cheese (panirov byorek, from Armenian: panir for cheese, Eastern Armenians refer to this as Khachapuri) or spinach (similar to spanakopita in Greek cuisine). They are a popular snack and fast food, often served as appetizer. Su byorek lit. 'water burek' is a lasagna-style dish with sheets of phyllo pastry briefly boiled in a large pan before being spread with fillings. Msov byorek is a bread roll (not phyllo pastry) stuffed with ground meat (similar to Russian pirozhki). They are thought to have entered Armenian cuisine in the middle ages through the Byzantine Empire, when early versions of this dish were known as plakous (savoury version). It was borrowed into Armenian as plagindi, plagunda, and pghagund. From the latter term came the later Arabic name iflaghun, which is mentioned in the medieval Arab cookbook Wusla ila al-habib as a specialty of the Cilician Armenians who settled in southern Asia Minor, where they later on had interactions with the neighboring Crusader kingdoms. Thus, the dish may have traveled to the Levant in the Middle Ages via the Armenians, many of whom migrated there following the first appearance of the Turkish tribes in medieval Anatolia.
- Loligov dzvadzekh (Armenian: լոլիգով ձվաձեխ) is a very common breakfast-dish in Armenia. Essentially a simple scramble with tomato as the base. Some iterations of this dish can include, most commonly, onions and bell peppers. Herbs (tarragon, purple basil, and coriander) also get added to the dish. It is usually served with traditional lavash bread, and a variation called Pamidorov dzvadzekh (Armenian: պամիդորով ձվաձեխ), which also adds cheese (like Chechil) to the dish.

== Appetizers ==
Meals in Armenia often start with a spread of appetizers served for "the table".

Lavash together with basturma/aboukh, soujoukh, cheeses (chechil, and other armenian cheeses), and sauces (matsoon, jajek, lecho, or ajika) often get served as an appetizer.

Armenian appetizers include stuffed vine leaves (called yalanchy sarma, a type of dolma), a fried cheese-stuffed pastry called dabgadz banir boerag, stuffed mussels (midye dolma) and several types of pickled vegetables generally known as torshi. Toasted pumpkin seeds (Armenian: տուտումի գուդ, romanized: tutumi gud) are a popular snack.

Chickpea balls called topik are a common Armenian appetizer; they are spiced with currants, onions, and cinnamon and served with a tahini sauce.

== Salads ==
Armenian salads include:

- Eetch – cracked wheat (its typical red colour is derived from crushed or pureed tomatoes) salad, additional ingredients include onion, parsley, olive oil, lemon, paprika, and bell peppers. It is similar to the Middle Eastern tabouleh.

== Soups and stews ==
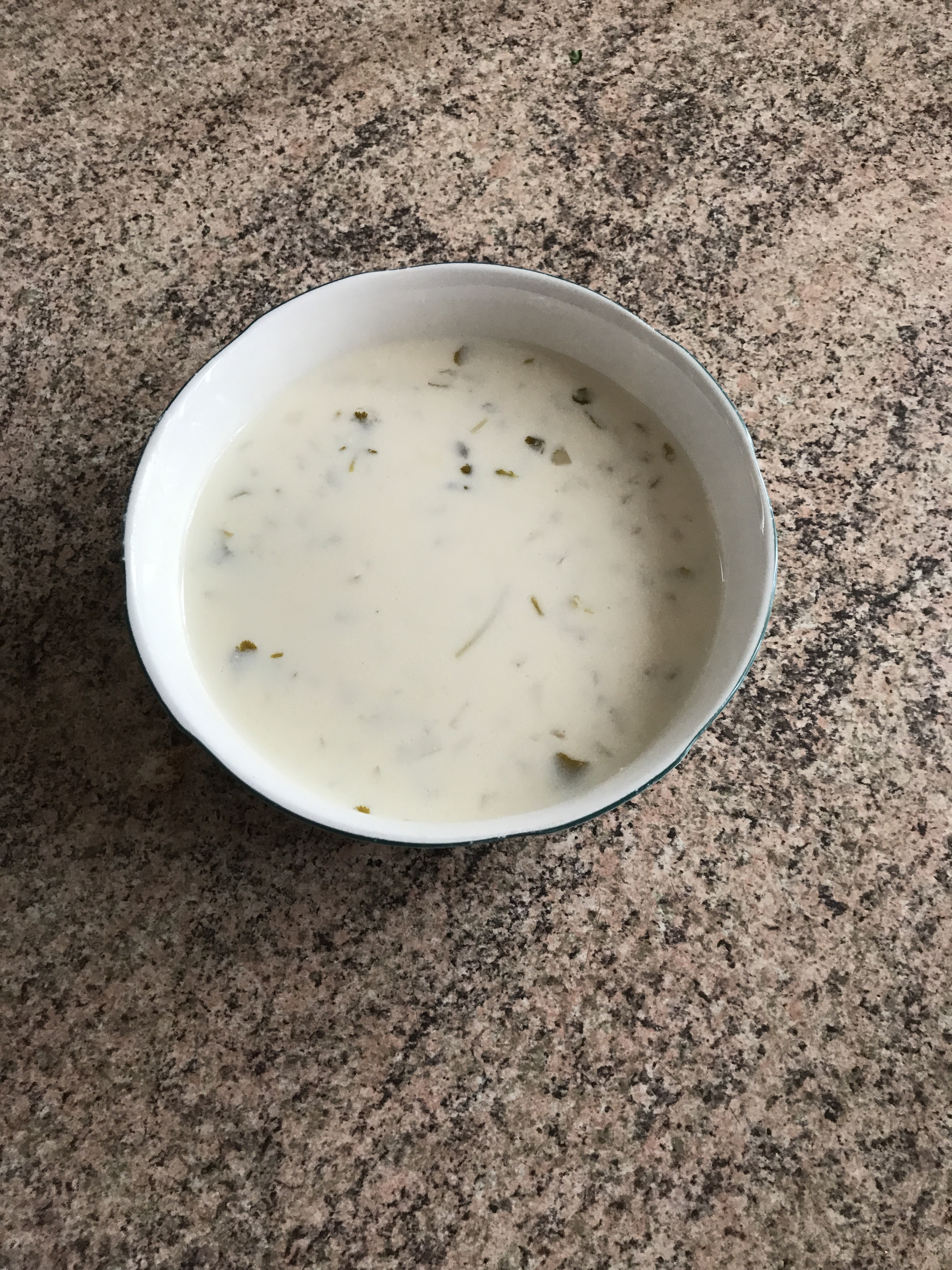
Spas

Spas (Armenian: Սպաս) is a matzoon (yogurt) soup, and a traditional dish in Armenia. Besides yogurt, the main ingredients are herbs, and hulled wheat berries. There are many varieties of spas, including rice, barley, or bulgur instead of wheat berries. Butter, onions and meatballs are often added for a richer taste.

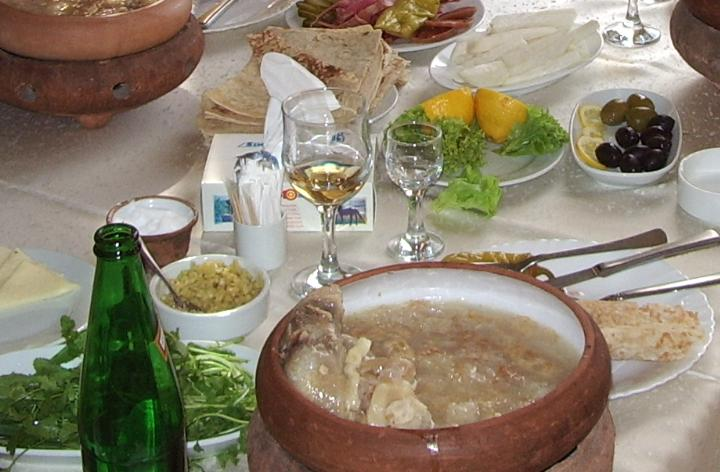
Khash served alongside other side-dishes

Khash is made from cow's head, feet, stomach, and herbs cooked into a clear broth.

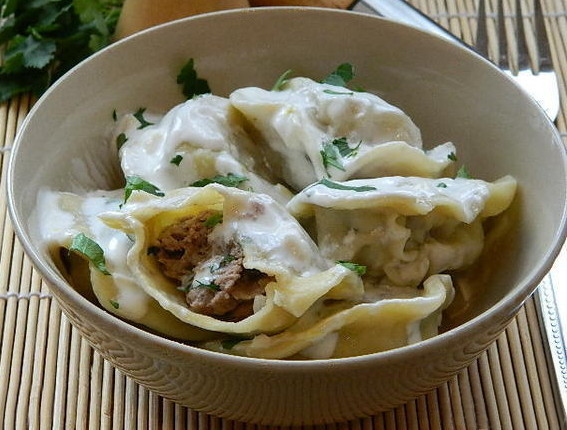
Manti with matzoon: an essential component of mantapour

Mantapour (Armenian: մանթապուր mantʿapur) is a soup typically made with matzoon, beaten eggs, flour, garlic and meat broth, to which Manti, either raw or pre-cooked are added. Wheat berries are often added to the soup. Matzoon-manti soup is seasoned with dried mint and consumed hot. There is also another version of mantapour, which consists of manti simmered in a clear broth, and then eaten with a dollop of matzoon or sour cream and parsley on top.

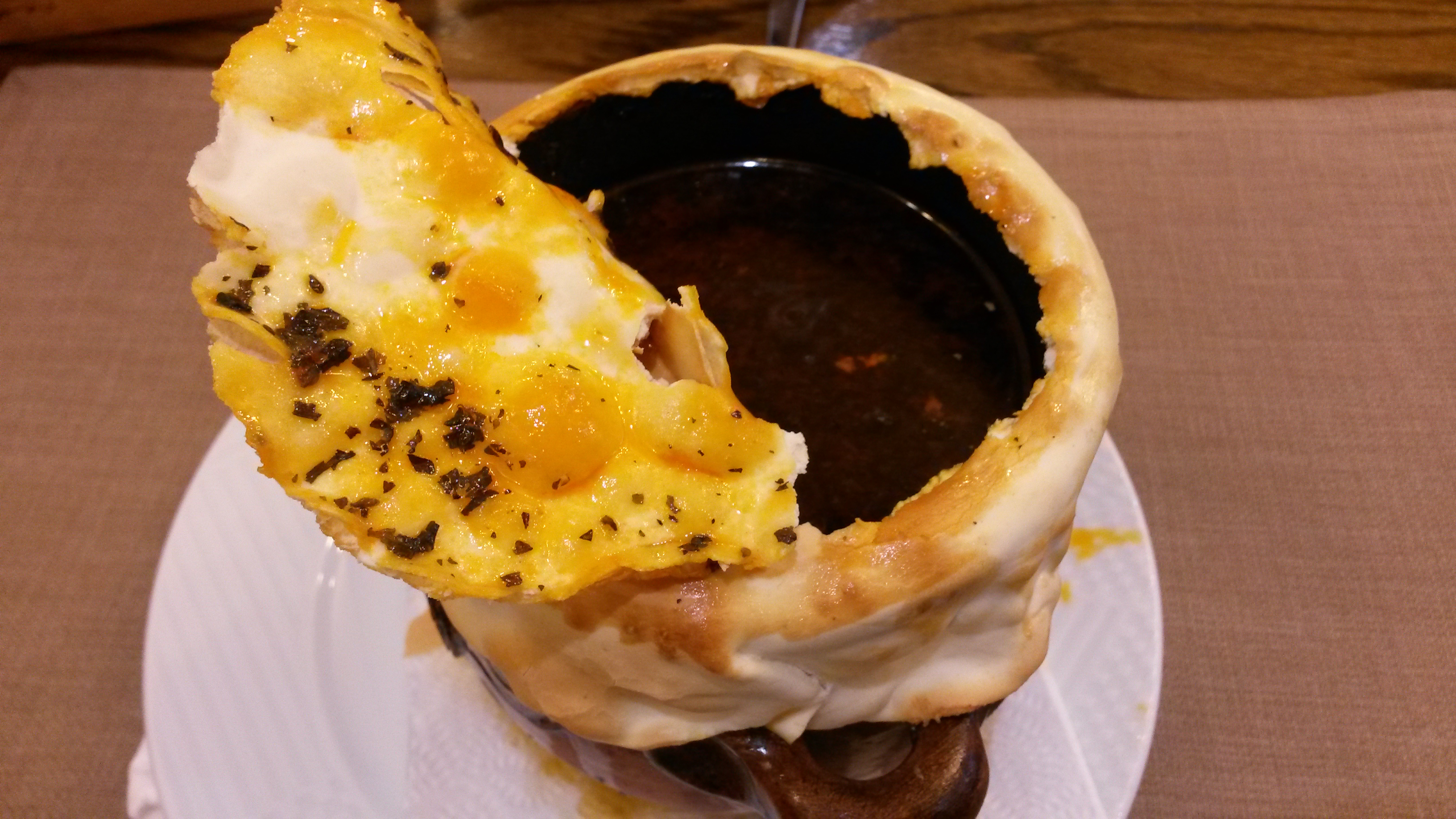
Putuk with covering bread

Putuk (Armenian: պուտուկ putuk) is a soup made with broth, mutton, and pre-soaked chickpeas in clay pots. During the cooking of the mutton and chickpeas, other ingredients such as potatoes, onions, dried alycha, and saffron are added. Slow cooking, which often lasts several hours, allows the flavors to fuse. The soup is served in the clay pot it was cooked in and is often accompanied by an Armenian leavened bread called matnakash.

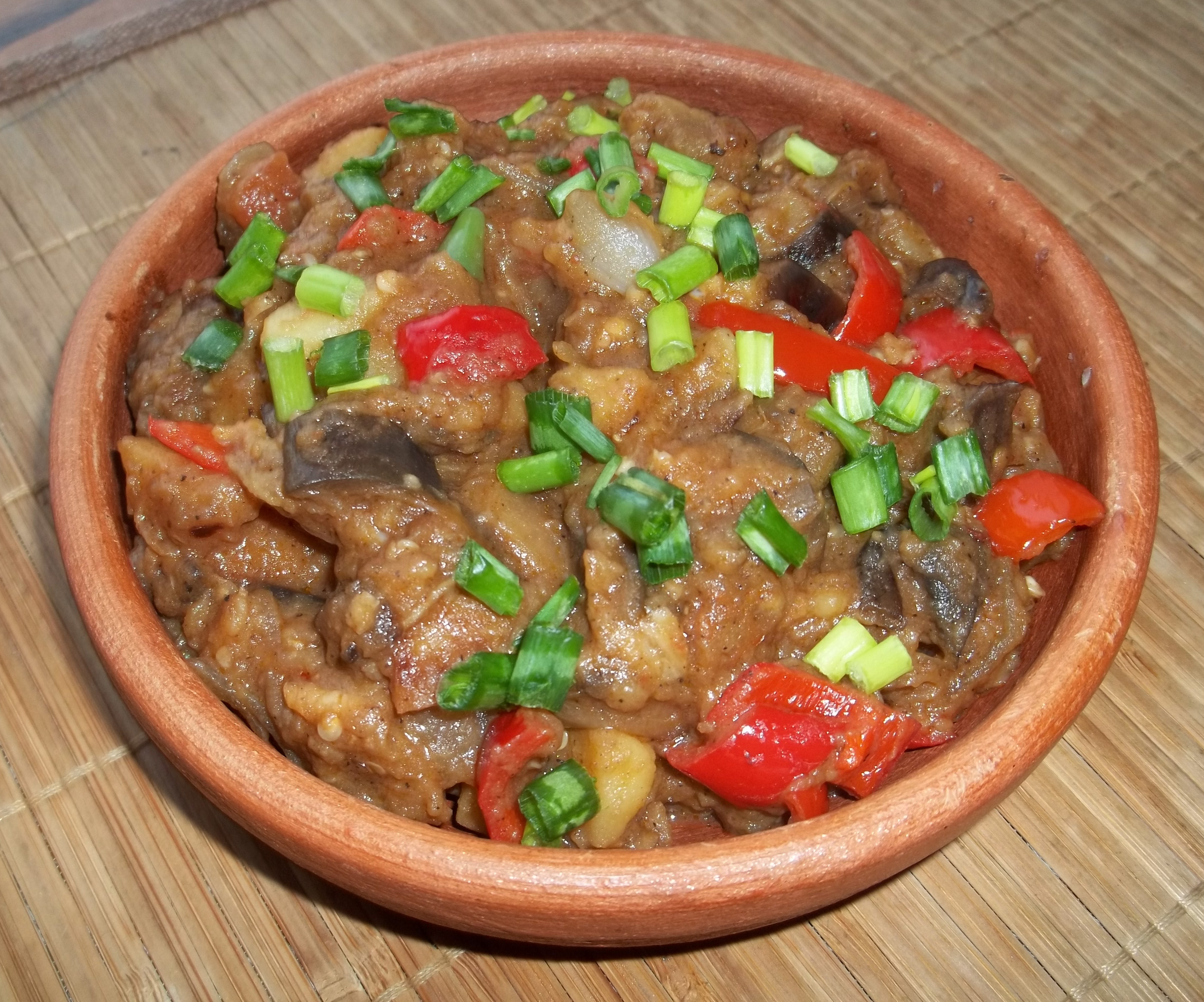
Ajapsandal

Ajapsandal (Armenian: Աջափսանդալ) is a vegetable stew made of eggplant, onion, tomato, and bell pepper, cooked in butter, or vegetable oil. It is seasoned with black pepper, garlic, basil, coriander leaves, parsley and other seasoning. Sometimes potato, chili pepper, and carrots are added although traditional recipes do not include them.

- Arganak (Armenian: արգանակ arganak) – soup that is based on seasoned meatballs, and onions, which are cooked in chicken broth, and flavored with lemon juice, egg yolks and parsley.
- Karshm (Armenian: կարշմ) is a local soup made in the town of Vaik in the Vayots Dzor Province. This is a walnut-based soup with red beans, green beans, chickpeas and spices. It is garnished with red pepper and garlic.
- Kyalagyosh (Armenian: քյալագյոշ) — Armenian matzoon soup served over toasted pieces of lavash. The soup is prepared with eggs, flour, matzoon, chicken bouillon, and sour cream. The soup is then flavored with dried thyme, mint, coriander and onions. There also is a version that adds lentils to the soup, making the lentils the main component.
- Vospapour (Armenian: ոսպապուր ospapur) – lentil soup made with brown lentils cooked in broth together with chickpeas, carrots, celery, coarse bulgur, and puréed dried fruits (especially apricot). It is flavoured with fried onions, mint, parsley, and cumin. Variations also include spices and ingredients like cayenne pepper, cinnamon, tomatoes, eggplants, spinach, and ground walnuts.
- Kololik (Armenian: կոլոլիկ) – is a traditional meatball soup. The meatballs are made with a combination of ground lamb, onions, parsley, black pepper, salt and other seasonings. The soup is prepared with a combination of onions, beaten eggs, rice, beef stock, tarragon, basil, and potatoes.
- Kololak (Armenian: կոլոլակ, or կոլոլակով ապոր Kololakov apoor) – is a soup made with meatballs (consisting of ground meat, rice, onion, egg, and black pepper) and vegetables like potatoes, carrots, and onions, cooked in a broth made out of water, butter, green chilli, bay leaves, basil, dill, coriander, black pepper, cumin, and a sauce called lecho (See: Herbs, spices and sauces part of this article).
- Sokonov (Armenian: սոկոնով, or սոկոնով ապոր, romanized: Sokonov apoor) – is a soup made with mushrooms, onions, egg, coriander, butter, and black pepper. When the soup is finished garlic-matzoon, parsley, and red pepper get put onto the soup for additional flavor.
- T'ghit (Armenian: թղիթ) is made from pastegh (thin rolled-up sheets of sour plum purée), which are cut into small pieces and boiled in water. Fried onions are added and the mixture is cooked into a purée. After that, pieces of lavash are placed on top. It is eaten hot, and lavash is used to scoop up the mixture by hand.
- Blghourapour (Armenian: բլղուրապուր blġurapur) – a sweet soup made of hulled wheat that is cooked in grape juice. It can be served hot, and cold.
- Bozbash (Armenian: բոզբաշ bozbaš) – a mutton or lamb soup that exists in several regional varieties with the addition of different vegetables. There is a special kind of bozbash served in Armenia. It is mamed Shoushin bozbash (Armenian: շուշին բոզբաշ), and is made from lamb, quince, apple, and mint. This variation of bozbash is "practically unknown outside of Armenia".
- Brndzapour (Armenian: բրնձապուր brndzapur) – rice and potato soup cooked in broth, and garnished with coriander.
- Dzavarapour (Armenian: ձավարապուր dzavarapur) – soup made from hulled wheat, potatoes, and tomato purée. Egg yolks are stirred into the soup before serving.
- Flol – (Armenian: ֆլօլ) beef soup made with millet, spinach leaves and sometimes also cherry-sized dumplings, that are cooked in broth.
- Krchik (Armenian: Քրճիկ kṙčik) – soup made from pickled cabbage, onions, potatoes, tomato purée, cracked wheat, potatoes, coriander, parsley, butter, black pepper, and salt.
- Tarkhana (Armenian: թարխանա t’arxana) – flour and matzoon soup
- The "everyday" Armenian stew is the Dzash (Ճաշ). This is a brothy stew consisting of meat (or a legume, in the meatless version), vegetables, and spices. The dzhash was typically cooked in the tonir. It is generally served alongside a pilaf of rice, or bulgur. It is sometimes accompanied by bread, torshi or fresh vegetables and herbs. A specific variety of dzhash is the porani (պորանի), a stew made with matzoon. Examples of dzhash are:

== Fish ==
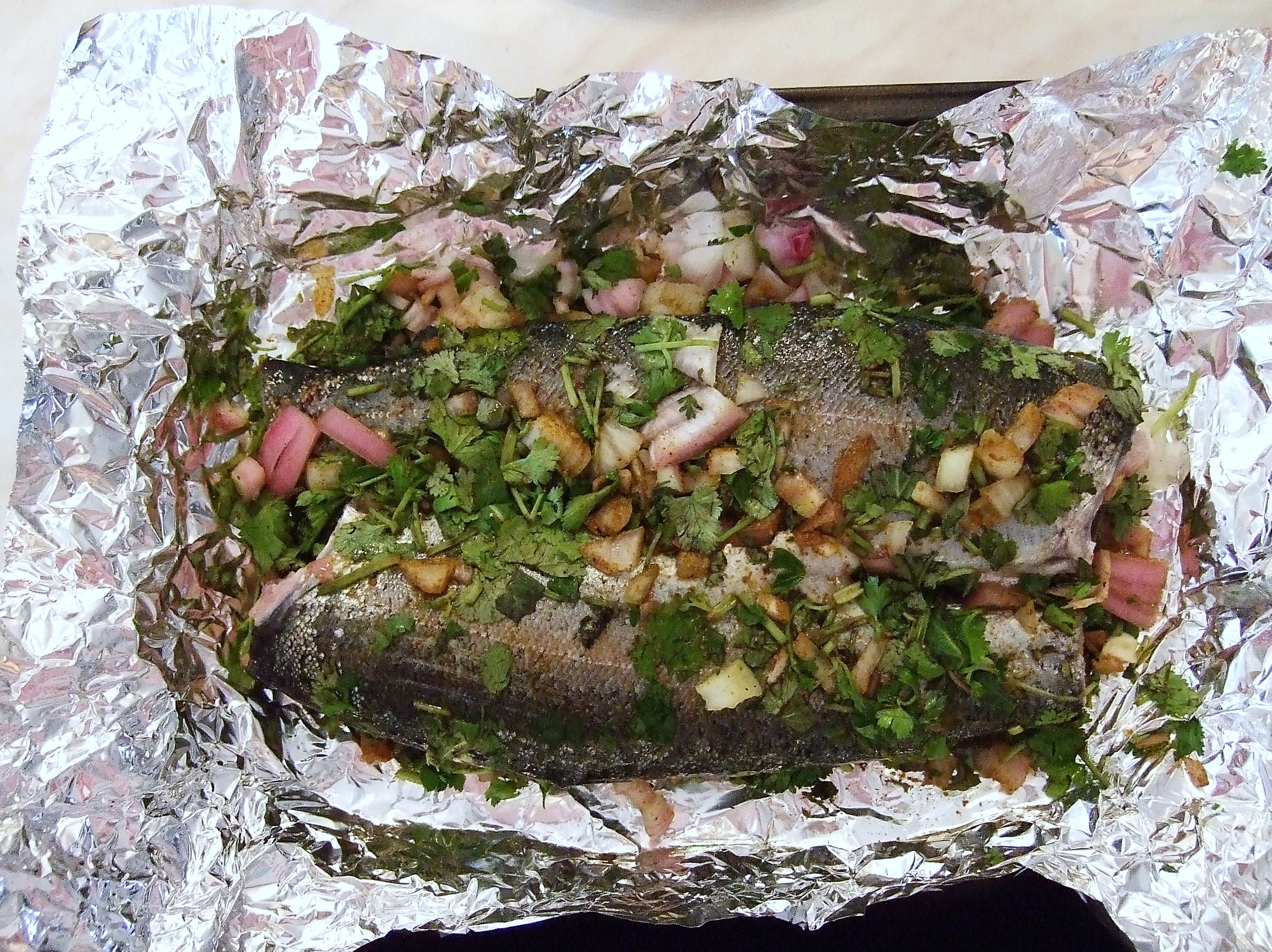
Sevan trout prepared before baking

Armenian cuisine includes many typical seafood dishes like fried mussels (midye tava), stuffed calamari (kalamar dolma), mackerel (uskumru) and bonito (palamut).

The trout from Lake Sevan is called ishkhan and can be prepared different ways including a filled version stuffed with dried fruits (prunes, damsons, or apricots) and a poached version marinated with red peppers. Ishkhan is also sometimes served in a walnut sauce.

There are several varieties of fish in Armenia:

- Sig (Armenian: սիգ sig) – a whitefish from Lake Sevan, native to northern Russian lakes (endangered species in Armenia).
- Karmrakhayt (alabalagh) (Armenian: կարմրախայտ karmrakhayt) – a river trout, also produced in high-altitude artificial lakes (e.g., the Mantash Reservoir in Shirak Province).
- Koghak (Armenian: կողակ koġak) – an indigenous Lake Sevan fish of the carp family, also called Sevan khramulya (overfished)

== Main courses ==
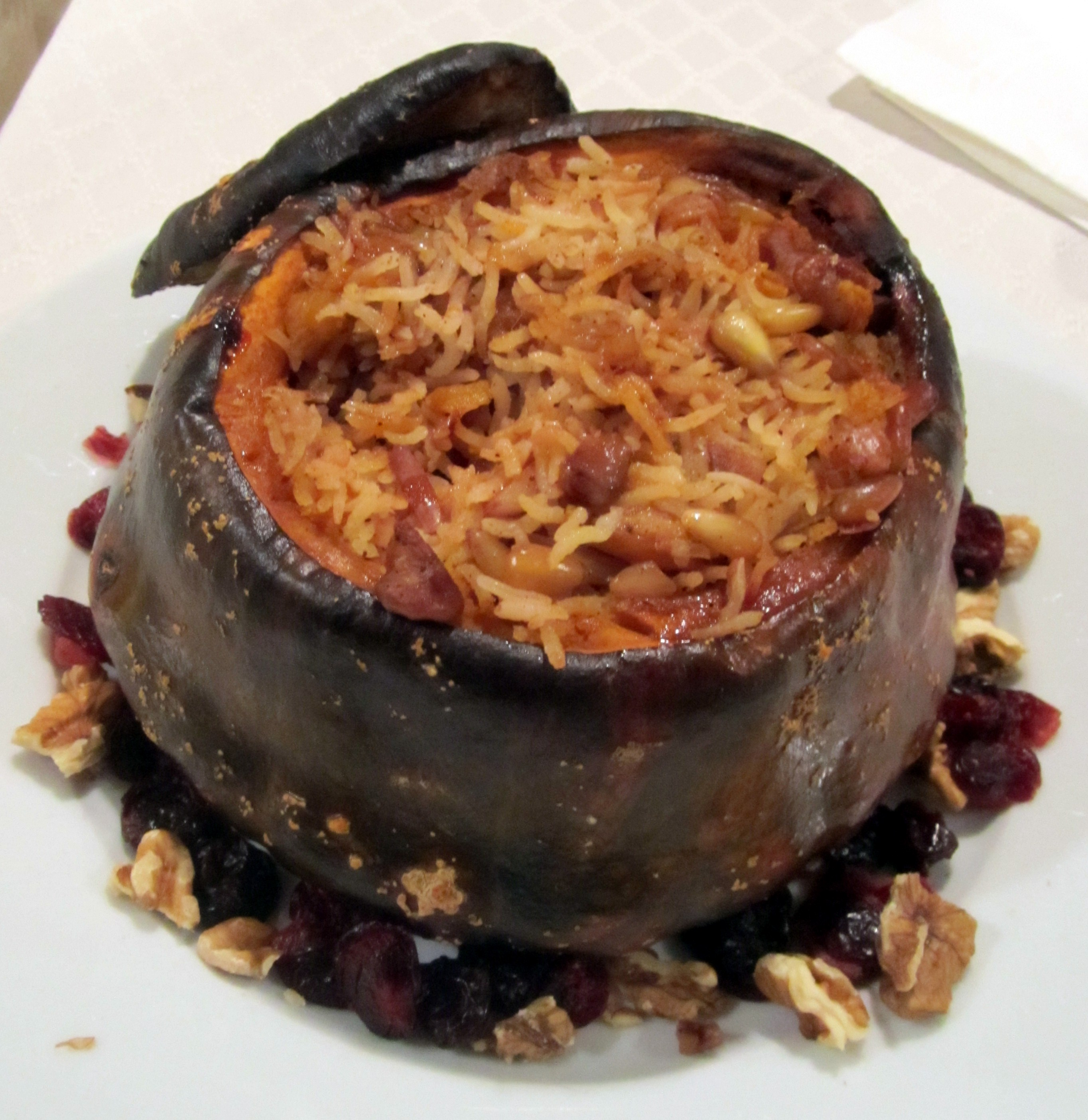
Ghapama made with butternut squash, instead of pumpkin

- Ghapama (Armenian: ղափամա ġap’ama) – pumpkin stew
- Tjvjik (Armenian: տժվժիկ tžvžik) – a dish of fried liver and kidneys with onions

== Ritual foods ==
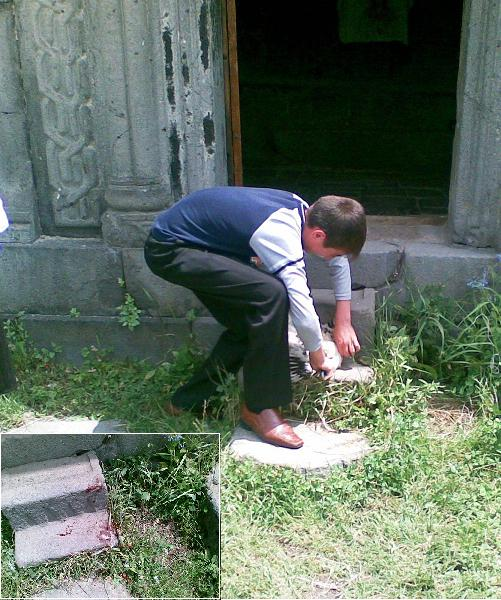
Matagh of a rooster at the entrance of a monastery church (Alaverdi, Armenia, 2009), with inset of bloody steps.

Ritual food of the Armenian Apostolic Church, is food consumed as part of ceremonies, rituals, and religious observances.

- Nshkhar (Armenian: նշխար nšxar) is the holy communion bread used during mass (Badarak) in the Armenian Church. It always has a Christian religious image imprinted on it.
- Matagh (Armenian: մատաղ mataġ) – sacrificial meat of any animal.

== Drinks ==
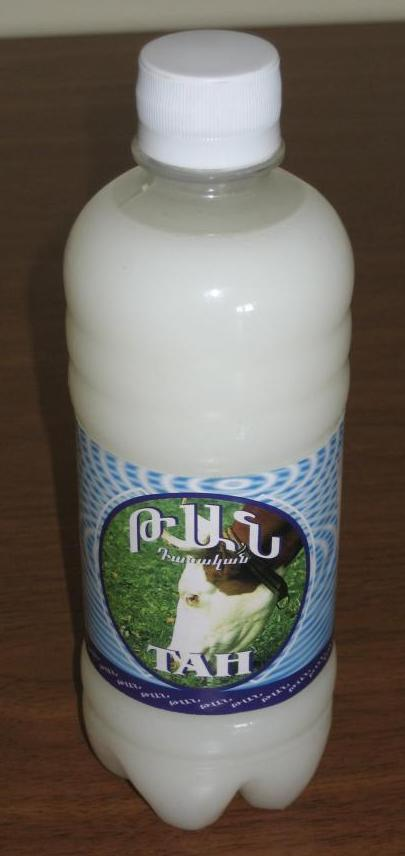
A bottle of Tan

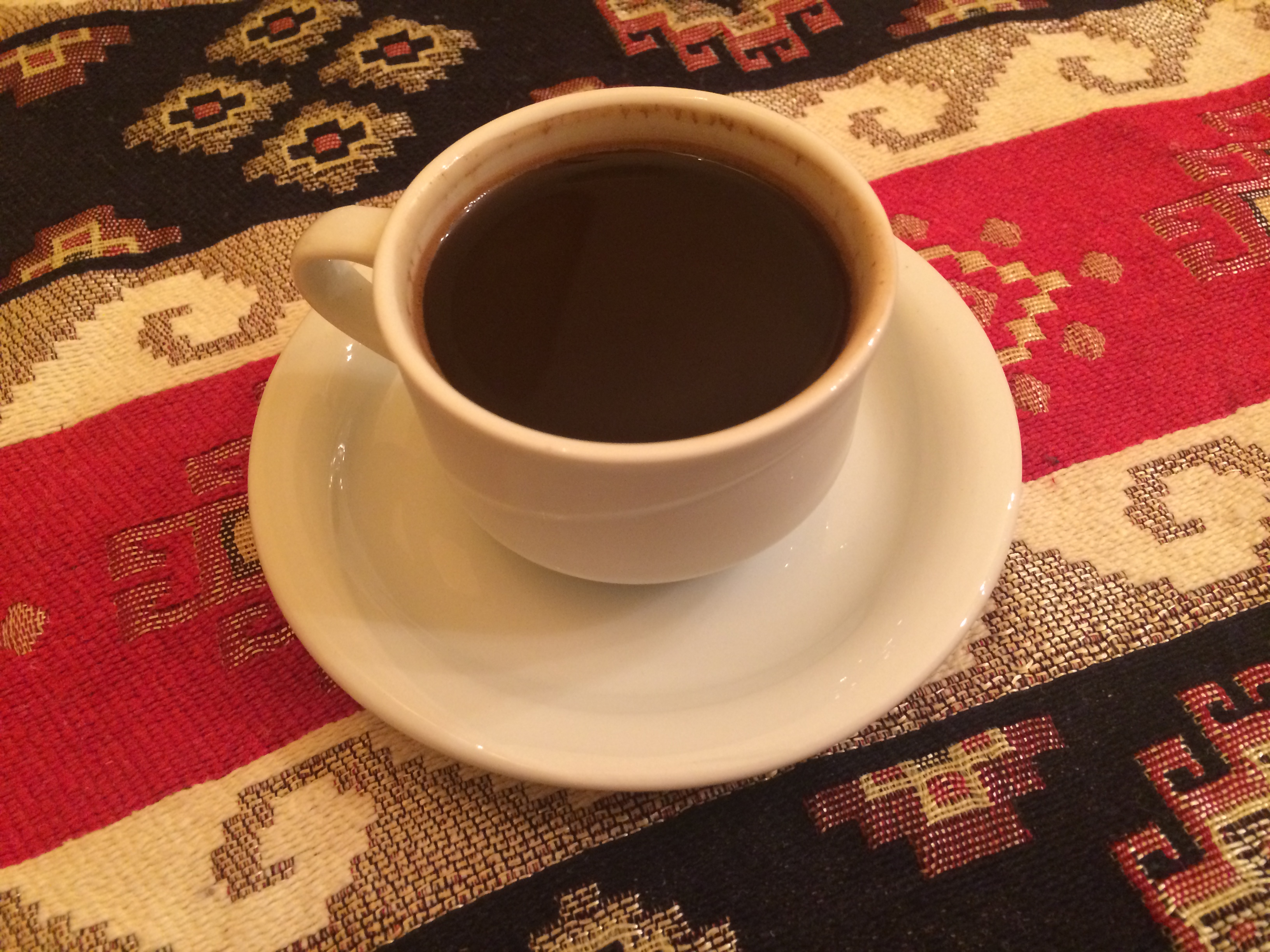
Armenian coffee

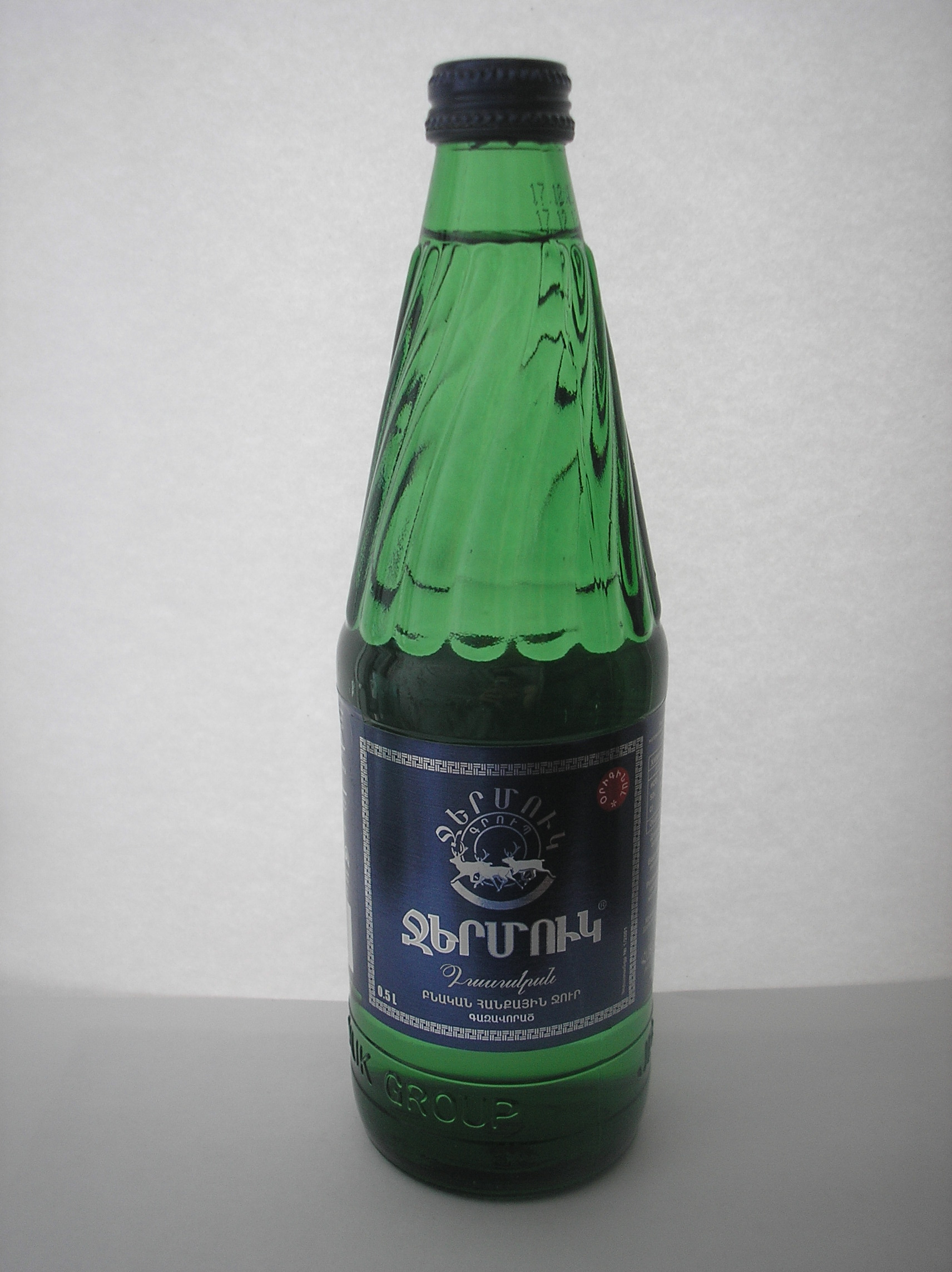
Jermuk is a bottled mineral water originating from the town of Jermuk in Armenia, and bottled since 1951

- Armenian coffee (Armenian: սուրճ) – is a type of strong coffee popular in Armenia. The main difference between Armenian coffee and Turkish coffee is that cardamom is used in Armenian coffee, while Turkish coffee doesn't use cardamom. Armenians introduced the coffee to Corfu when they settled the island, where it is known as "eastern coffee" due to its Eastern origin. According to The Reuben Percy Anecdotes compiled by journalist Thomas Byerley, an Armenian opened a coffee shop in Europe in 1674, at a time when coffee was first becoming fashionable in the West. In Armenian it is either called հայկական սուրճ, haykakan surč, 'Armenian coffee', or սեւ սուրճ, sev surč, 'black coffee', referring to the traditional preparation done without milk or creamer. If unsweetened it is called bitter (դառը or daruh), but more commonly it is brewed with a little sugar. The coffee gets poured into the cup from a srjeb (Armenian: սրճեփ).
- Kefir (Armenian: կեֆիր) – fermented milk drink
- Tan (Armenian: թան) – matzoon drink (still or carbonated), often flavored with herbs (like parsely and mint) and vegetables like cucumber.
- Herbal tea (Armenian: թեյ) – is a type of tea drunk in Armenia. The most popular flavors are ziziphora, mint, chamomile, and thyme.
- Jermuk (Armenian: Ջերմուկ J̌ermuk) – a brand of mineral water from the Jermuk area.
- Hayk, Sari – a brand of bottled mountain spring water from the Jermuk area (in Armenian Hayk stands for Armenian and Sari for from the mountains).
- Tarkhun soda (Armenian: թարխուն t’arxun) – tarragon-flavored soda.
- Pomegranate juice (Armenian: Նռան հյութ) – is a popular beverage in Armenia and can be found in almost all Armenian cities and villages.

=== Alcoholic drinks ===
==== Beer ====
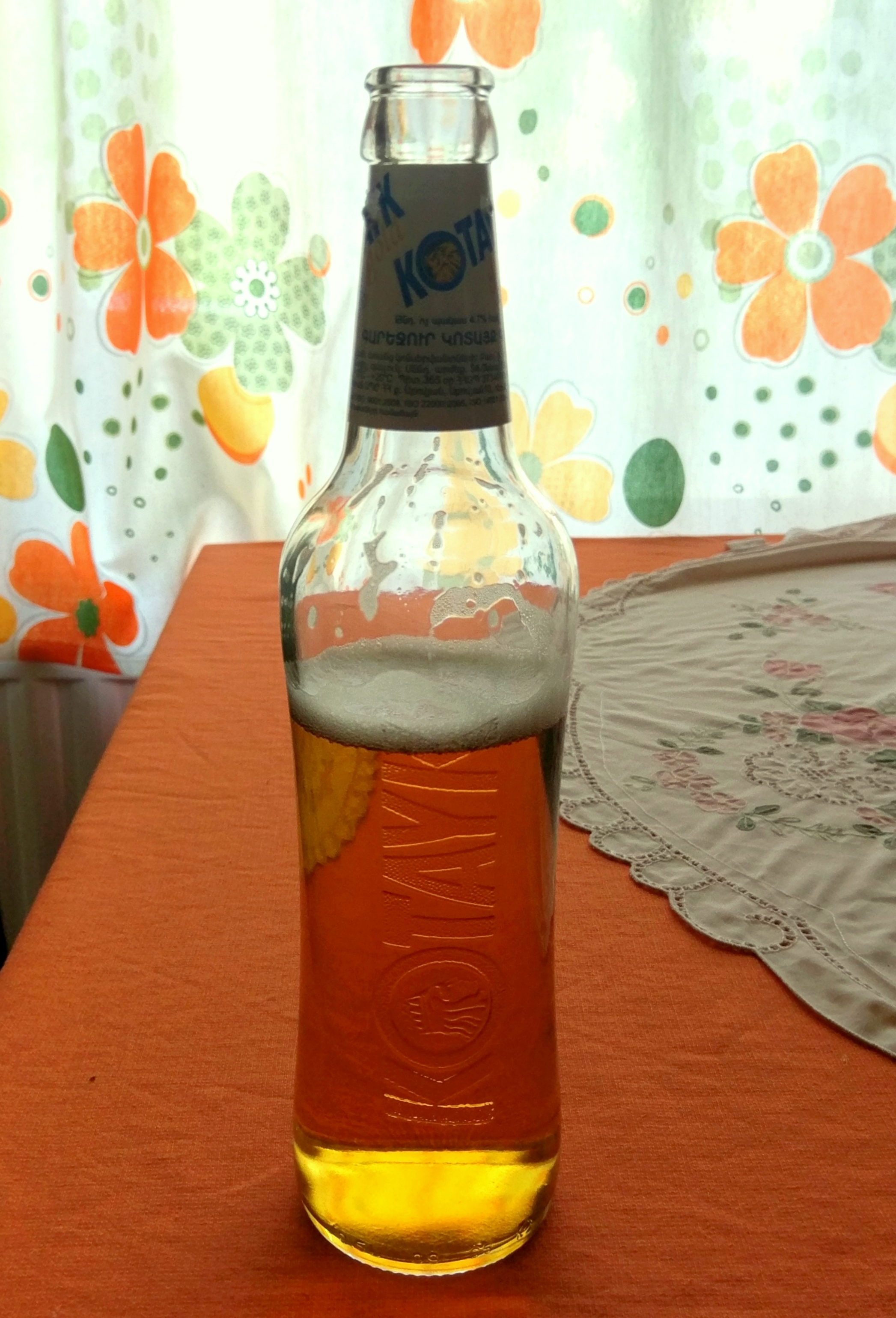
A bottle of Kotayk Gold

Armenian-produced beer (Armenian: գարեջուր gareǰur) is considered to be one of the favorite drinks of Armenian men. The beer industry is developing barley malt and producing beer from it. The preparation of beer in Armenia was known from ancient times. According to the Greek historian Xenophon the manufacture of beer existed in Armenia when he first arrived there(in the 5-4th century BC). Armenians used beer grains for brewing (barley, millet, hops).

In 1913 there were three beer factories that produced 54,000 deciliters of beer. From 1952 to 1978, new factories in Yerevan, Goris, Alaverdi, Abovyan were built while existing factories were expanded and improved upon. For providing raw materials for beer production in Gyumri, a large malt plant was launched based in the production of barley malt of Shirak valley farms (with the capacity of 10,000 tons of production). In 1985, 6,000,000 deciliters of beer were produced.

Popular brands

- Kotayk
- Erebuni (produced by Kotayk Brewery)

==== Brandy ====
Armenian brandy (Armenian: կոնյակ konyak), known locally as konyak is perhaps Armenia's most popular exported alcoholic drink. It has a long history of production. Armenian brandy made by Yerevan Wine & Brandy Factory was said to be the favorite drink of British statesman Winston Churchill. It was the favorite alcoholic drink of Joseph Stalin, Franklin D. Roosevelt and Winston Churchill at the Yalta Conference at 1945.

The history of Armenian brandy (Ararat Brandy) begins in 1877, in the winery of Armenian merchant N. Tairov (Yerevan). By 1890–1900 Yerevan was becoming a center for the production of brandy, numbering a number of factories owned by Gyozalov (1892), Saradjev (1894), Ter-Mkrtchian (1899), and others. In 1899, N. Tairov sold his factory to Nikolay Shustov's well-known brand in Russia. In 1914, there were 15 factories in the province of Yerevan (the largest the one later owned by Shustov) produced 210,010 deciliters of brandy. In 1921, the Soviet state took over Shustov's factory, and it was renamed to "Ararat". This became the main factory for wine manufacturing.

Despite the fact that only brandies produced in the Cognac region of France have the legal permission to be called "cognac" according to Western trade rules, Armenian brandy is called cognac inside Armenia.

Armenian brandy is categorized by its age and method of aging. The rated stars indicate the age of brandy since its fermentation starting from 3 stars. The most expensive cognacs have passed additional vintage for more than 6 years and have special names. The brandy is aged in oak barrels and is made from selected local white grapes grown in the Ararat Valley.

Popular Brands

- Ararat
- Noy

==== Oghi ====
Oghi (Armenian: օղի òġi) – an Armenian alcoholic beverage usually distilled from fruit; also called aragh. Artsakh is a well-known brand name of Armenian mulberry vodka (tuti oghi) produced in Nagorno-Karabakh from local fruit. In the Armenian Diaspora, where fruit vodka is not distilled, oghi refers to the aniseed-flavored distilled alcoholic drink called arak.

- Tuti oghi (Armenian: թթի օղի t’t’i òġi) - mulberry oghi. It is the most popular variation of this alcoholic drink
- Honi oghi – from hon, sour cherry (cornelian cherry)
- Tsirani oghi – from apricots
- Tandzi oghi – from pears
- Khaghoghi oghi – from grapes
- Salori oghi – from plums
- Moshi oghi – from blackberry
- Tzi oghi – from figs
- Khundzori oghi – from apples

==== Wine ====
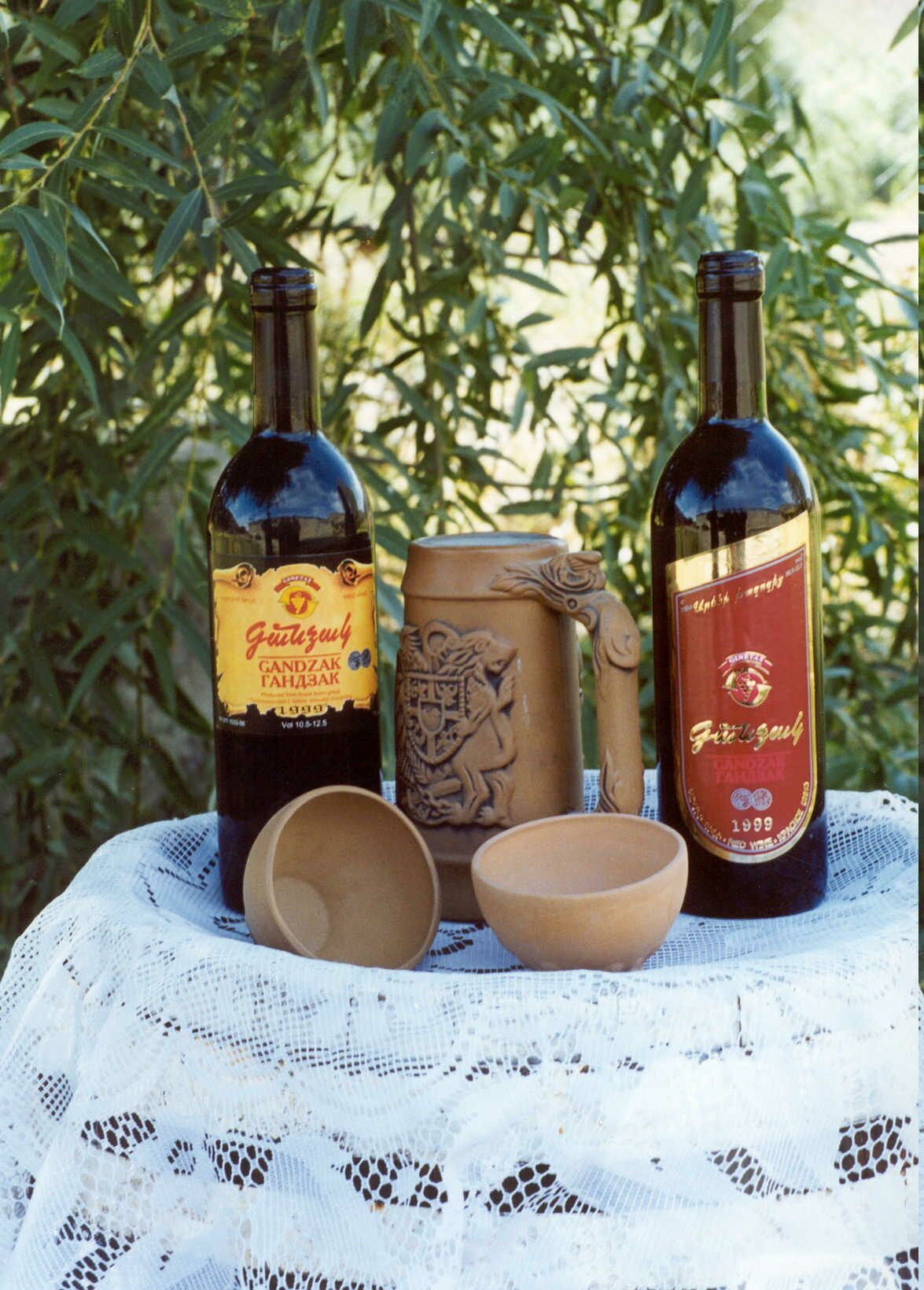
Armenian wine

The alcoholic drink with the longest history in Armenia is wine. The oldest known winery in the world was discovered in Armenia. Historically, wineries in Armenia were concentrated along the Ararat valley. Of particular note was the district of Koghtn (Գողթն, current Nakhichevan area). Today, Armenian wineries are concentrated in the Areni region (district of Vayots Dzor).

Armenian wine is mostly made from local varietals, such as Areni, Lalvari, Kakhet, etc., though some wineries mix in better known European varietals such as Chardonnay and Cabernet. Winemaking took a downward plunge in the years following the collapse of the Soviet Union, but is undergoing a revival, with the addition of world-class labels such as Zorah Wines. A yearly wine festival, held in Areni, is popular with the locals and features wines from official wineries as well as homemade hooch of varying quality. Armenian wines are predominantly red and are sweet, semi-sweet (Vernashen, Ijevan), or dry (Areni).

Armenian Highland engaged in winemaking since ancient times. It has achieved considerable development of Urartu times (9th – 6th centuries. BC). During excavations in the castle of Teyshebaini around traces of 480 different types of grapes were found, and in Toprakkale, Manazkert, Red Hill and Ererbunium 200 pots.

The evidences of high-level and large-scale wine production in Armenia are as foreign (Herodotus, Strabo, Xenophon and others) and Armenian historians of the 5th–18th centuries, as well as sculptures of architectural monuments and protocols. Armenia's current area began wine production in the 2nd half of the 19th century. At the end of the 19th century, next to the small businesses in Yerevan, Ghamarlu (Artashat), Ashtarak, Echmiadzin (Vagharshapat ), there were 4 mill.

In addition to grapes, wines have been made with other fruit, notably pomegranate (Armenian: նռան գինի nran kini), apricot, quince, etc. In some cases, these fruit wines are fortified.

==== Mineral waters ====
Armenia has rich reserves of mineral water. After the establishment of the Soviet Union the study and development of multilateral disciplines in these waters began. First industrial bottling was organized in Arzni in 1927. In 1949, Dilijan and Jermuk mineral water factories were put into operation. In 1960–1980 “Sevan”, “Hankavan”, “Lichk”, “Bjni”, “Lori”, “Arpi”, “Ararat”, mineral water bottling plants and factories were launched, which are involved in the production unit "mineral water of Armenia". ASSR in 1985 produced 295 million bottles of mineral water.

== See also ==
- Culture of Armenia
- List of dishes from the Caucasus
