= Kamarlu (disambiguation) =

Kamarlu is a village in Iran.

Kamarlu or Ghamarlu may also refer to:

- Artashat, Armenia
- Metsamor, Echmiadzin, Armenia
