= Kyalla =

- Alternative names: Gyumrva kyalla
- Course: Main dish
- Place of origin: Armenia
- Associated cuisine: Armenian cuisine
- Main ingredients: Bull's head

Kyalla (Armenian: քյալլա, lit. 'head', Armenian pronunciation: [kʰjɑˈlːɑ])) is a traditional Armenian dish consisting of a roasted bull's head. Historically, it was associated with lower socioeconomic groups, but over time it became more widely consumed and is now particularly popular in the city of Gyumri.

== Etymology ==
The term kyalla derives from the Gavar dialect of Eastern Armenian, where it means "head."

== See also ==
- Armenian cuisine
