= Arganak =

Traditional Armenian soup

Arganak (Armenian: արգանակ) is a traditional cooked Armenian soup. It is considered one of the oldest Armenian dishes.

== Ingredients ==
It consists of meatballs, rice, onions, chicken broth, lemon juice, yolk, and parsley.
