= Colombo Yogurt =

American brand of yogurt

- Type: Food processing
- Industry: Food Processing
- Founded: 1929; 97 years ago (Andover, Massachusetts)
- Fate: stopped in 2010; 16 years ago
- Key people: Sarkis Colombosian
- Products: Yogurt
- Parent: General Mills

Colombo Yogurt was an American brand of yogurt first sold in 1929. It originated from a family business run by Rose and Sarkis Colombosian, Armenian immigrants who lived in Andover, Massachusetts. Yogurt was first commercially produced and sold in the United States in 1929 by the Colombosians, whose family business later became Colombo Yogurt. The yogurt produced by the Colombosians was based on traditional Armenian cooking methods. The business saw growth in the 1960s due to the increased awareness of the health benefits of yogurt.

In 1993, Colombo Yogurt was purchased by General Mills.

== Termination ==
On January 29, 2010, General Mills announced that it was dropping the Colombo brand to focus more on its Yoplait yogurt. It ended shipments on February 12, 2010. General Mills still produces soft-serve frozen yogurt under the Colombo name.
