= Purple ruffles basil =

Type of basil

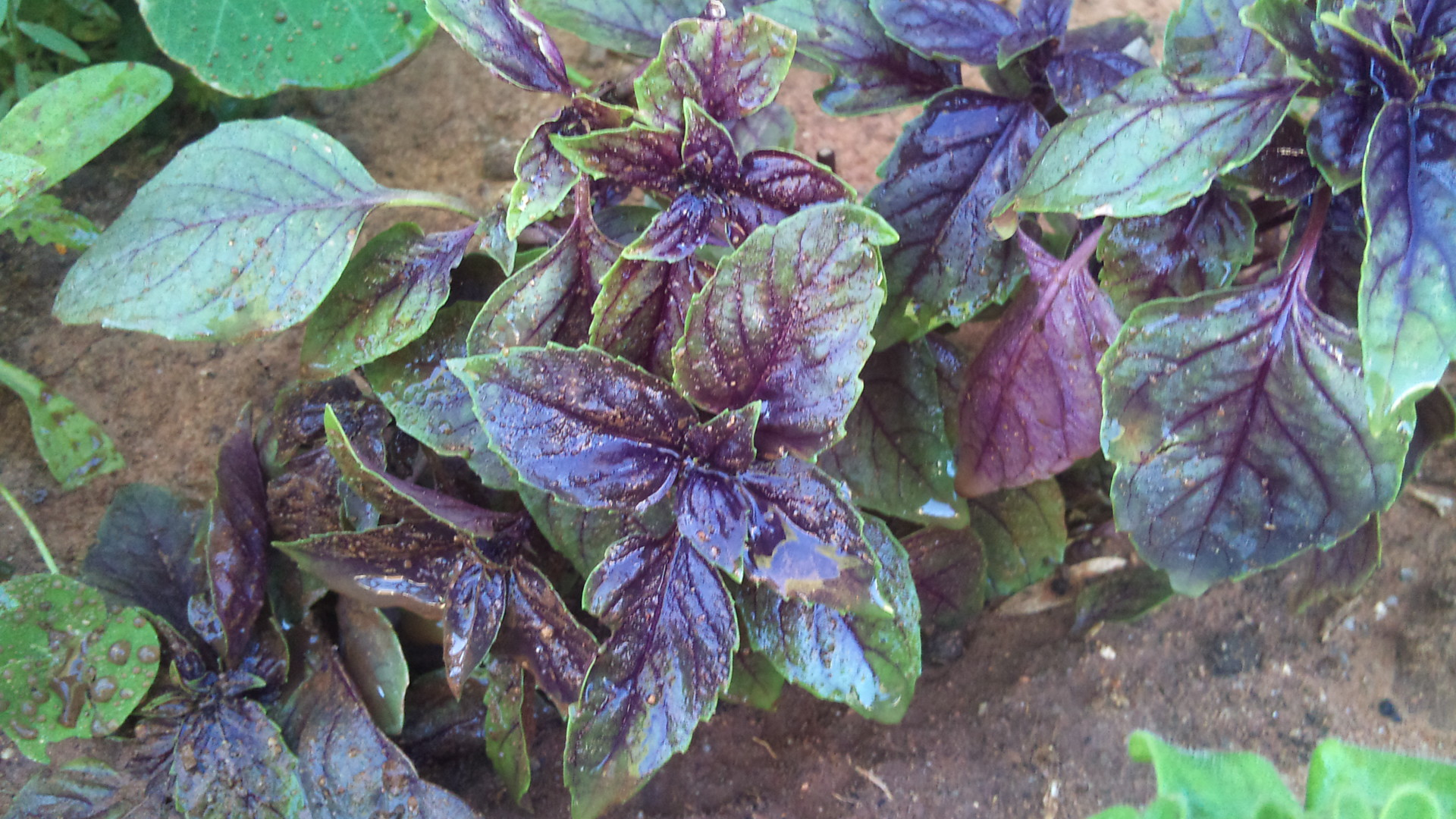
Purple variety, Ocimum basilicum.

Purple ruffles basil is a cultivar of Ocimum basilicum (sweet basil). The dark purple leaves are used in pesto or as a garnish. This attractive basil variety has won multiple awards for its beauty, flavor and ease of cultivation, including the Mississippi Medallion and All-American Selection awards. This variety of purple leaf basil is characterized by its deep ruffles and decorative serrated leaf margins.
