= Nshkhar =

Nshkhar (Armenian: նշխար nšxar) is the communion bread used during the liturgy (Badarak) in the Armenian Church. A blessed but unconsecrated version may also be given out by a priest at special occasions, such as a house blessing.

At the end of liturgy, deacons or other church officials will hand out portions of a blessed unleavened bread, known as mas (Armenian: մաս mas), to the congregation. In some Armenian communities, this bread is baked especially for this purpose, but in others it may simply consist of lavash.

It always has a religious (Christian) image printed on top of it.
