= Custom and traditions in Azerbaijan =

National traditions are well preserved in Azerbaijan. They have a long history, namely originates from the formation of the Azerbaijani people. There are several traditions in Azerbaijan, some customs and traditions differ from region to region.

== Tea Culture ==
Serving tea to guests is one of the ancient traditions in Azerbaijan. Azerbaijani people usually prefer to dunk a piece of sugar into the tea, then bite a piece and sip their tea instead of adding sugar into it. Serving tea just before the main meal with different kinds of jam, (strawberry, fig, apricot, blackberry, cherry, walnut), sweets and fruit desserts is considered to be a symbol of hospitality. The tea table is not complete without lemon. They served hot tea in cups or Armudi Glass (pear-shaped glass). Armudi Glass is a symbol of tea ceremony. The main point in the tea preparation process is the water boiling technique. The smell and taste of fresh samovar tea (Samovar is a metal container for water boiling purposes) is unique and cannot be compared with other tea smells. An Azerbaijani family of four members uses approximately 500gr of tea monthly and about 6–8 kg yearly.

Tea is served in any ceremony in Azerbaijan regardless of whether it is a funeral or a wedding. Whether tea is sweet or sugarless shows the decision or at least the opinion of parents of girls about the marriage on the matchmaking process. Sugar is the key indicator of their agreement.

== Novruz Holiday in Azerbaijan ==
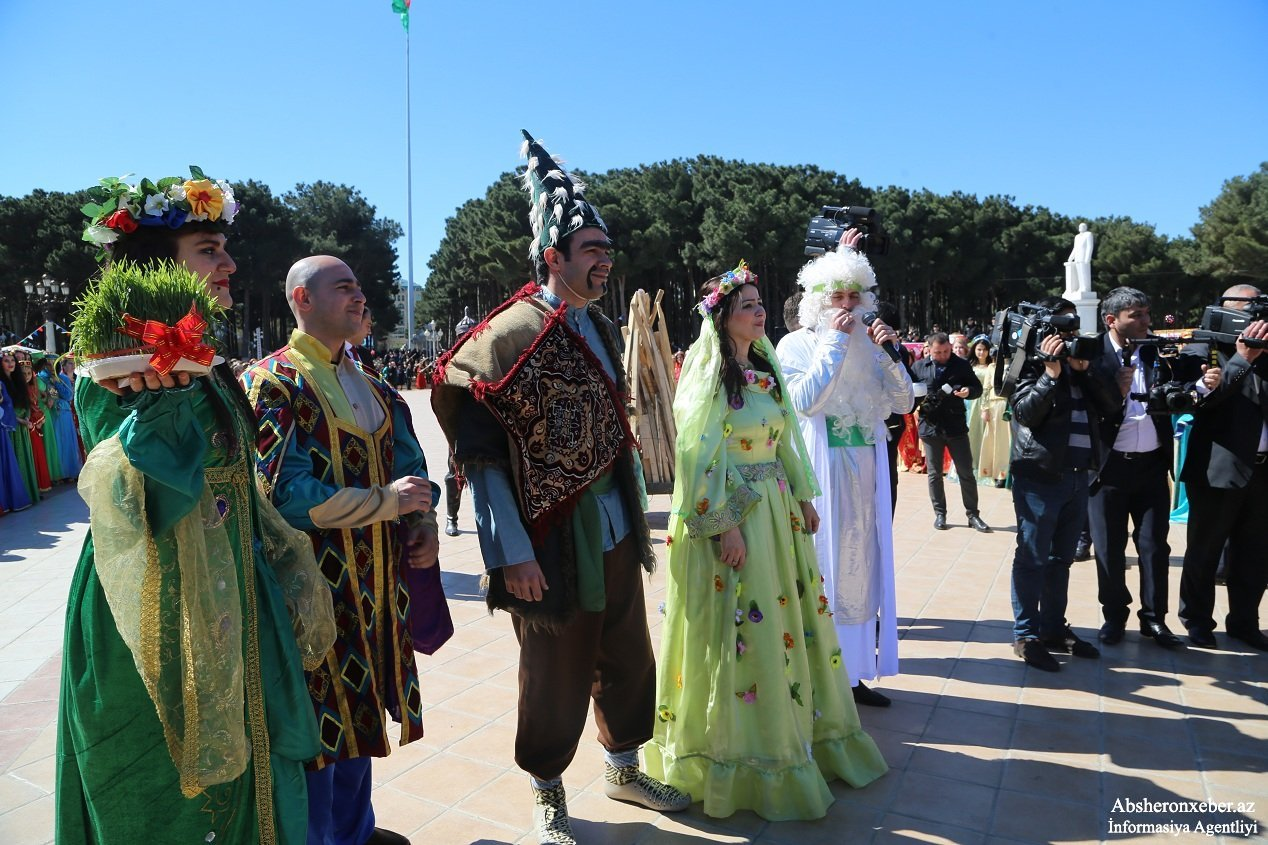
Kosa, Kechel and Bahar Gizi

Azerbaijanis start holiday 4 Wednesdays before 21 March which is the symbol of winter's end and the coming of the New year. They are called Water Wednesday, Fire Wednesday, Wind Wednesday, Earth or Last Wednesday. Nowruz holiday consists of ceremonies and traditions. People start to clean house, paint eggs, sprout up semeni, make national pastries such as shekerbura, pakhlava, shorgoghal, badambura and a great variety of national cuisine. It is tradition to light a candle matching the number of family members. One of the main attributes of Nowruz is egg. Many nations considered that the egg is a symbol of life. Each egg colour has its own meaning. Egg painted Red color - summer, Green Color – Spring, Yellow Color- autumn, Non-color egg means winter.

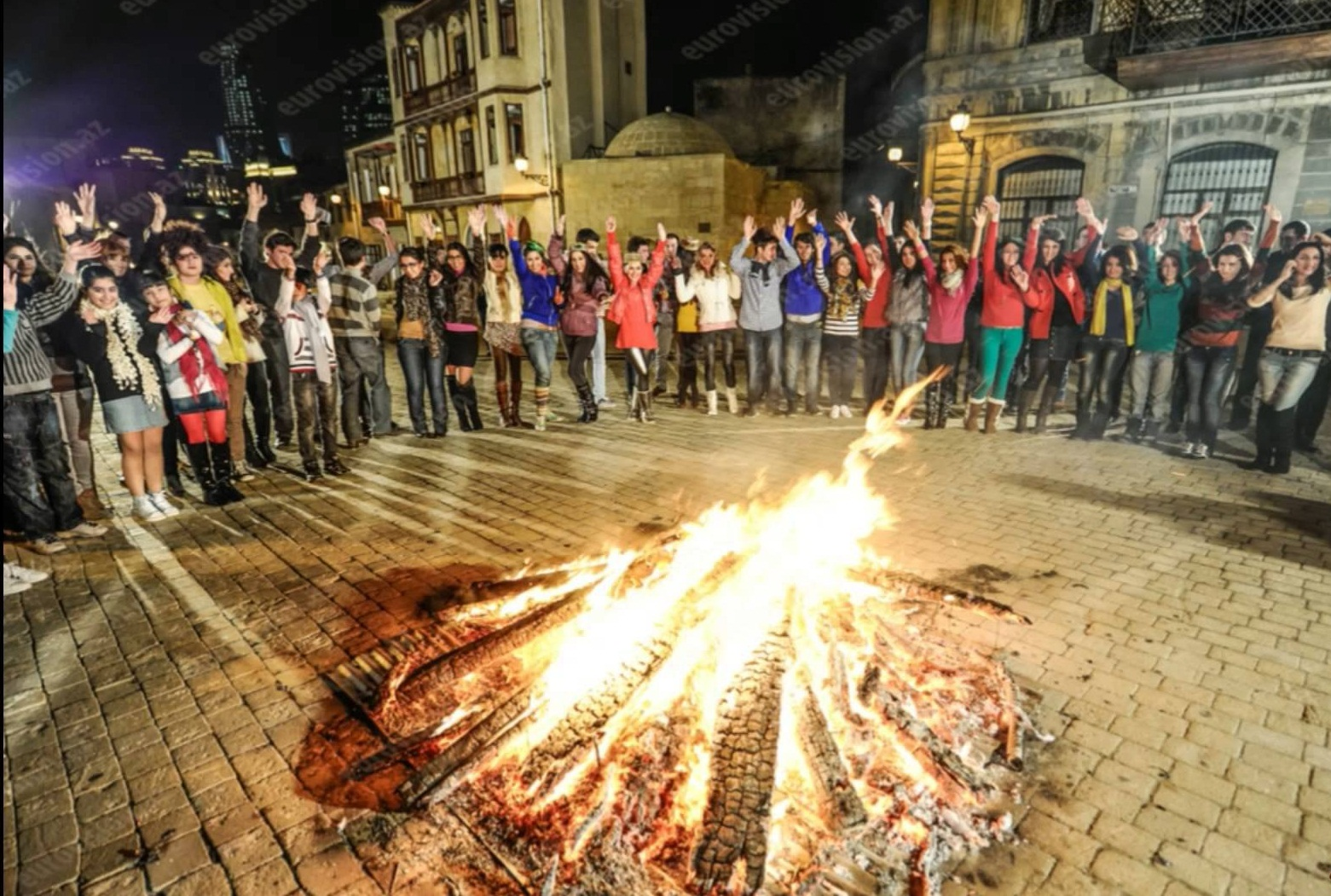
Bonfire on Nowruz Holiday

Symbolic characters of Nowruz are manifested by Kechel, Kosa, and Bahar gizi (Spring girl). Their meanings are: The period prior to Nowruz is embodied by Kechel as well as to indicate the renewal of nature, the fertility symbol is Kosa, while landscaping of nature is represented by Bahar gizi.

At night, everyone should jump over a bonfire 7 times while telling a special phrase. After holiday people visit adults and elder people to congratulate their holiday and the elderly will often give gifts to the younger. And people who quarreled got reconciled on that day.

=== Hat throwing ===
Another tradition is "papagatdi". children knock on the neighbors' or relatives’ doors and leave behind the door their hats or a little basket and they hide. And secretly wait for candies, pastry, and nuts. People never give it back empty.

=== Semeni ===
Semeni is one of the symbols of Nowruz. Usually Semeni is made from the seed of wheat. It must be sprout up in every home on Nowruz. The first sneak of the spring shows a revival of nature. If it is going green, it means this year will be fertile.

=== Traditional Nowruz beliefs ===
There are several beliefs for young girls about telling fortune in Nowruz.

==== Eavesdropping ====
People overhear conversation behind the doors of their neighbors in the afternoon. Then girls try to tell stories about their fortune and make guesses based on the first heard word if their wishes come true. That is why everybody tries to speak pleasantly on that day. For example, if somebody says “turn on light”, it means everything will be good. On contrary, if expressions like “turn off”, “darn it” etc. are overheard it clues about negative consequences.

==== To eat salty cake ====
When it's sleeping time, they must eat extremely salty cake that is prepared in advance. It is not allowed to drink water. If they have a dream of someone handing them over a glass of water, he will be her future husband.

==== Apple soothsaying ====
People also eat an apple on that day. When they go to bed they put 10 apples’ seeds under the pillow and they will have a future husband in their dream.

== Wedding traditions ==
=== Girl liking or seeing ===
If boy and girl liked each other, first of all, they must ask the opinion of parents. According to traditions, the boy's mother and one of the close relatives visit the girl's home to discuss with her parents the relationship between their children. Then fathers of both sides meet. Usually, girls father doesn't agree for the first time and says the following: “Qız qapısı, şah qapısı” (meaning is “Maiden's door is the door of the king, that is why you must come several times for my agreement”) “I will say final decision after I discuss it with my daughter and wife’’. When the father asks his daughter about this relationship, the daughter must remain silent. Silence means agreement. This is because the main decision belongs to adults and elders.

=== Match-making ===
Boy's Father invites close relatives such as uncles and aunts to the home. After consulting they decide to go to the girl's home for match-making. Then, they tell the girl's mother that they plan to go to their house for match-making on a certain day. On that day, everyone drinks sweet tea after the final agreement between the two families.

=== Nişan (Engagement) ===
After a few months, the boy's family brings an engagement ring, one shawl, and many sweets to the girl. A close relative of the boy (it could be the brother, brother-in-law, etc.) fixes a ring on her finger and puts a shawl on the girl's shoulder. According to Azerbaijani traditions, it is believed that if an engaged girl lays her right hand on the head of a single girl, they, too, will soon wed.

=== Holiday gift ===
Boy's family must bring gifts in all holidays until the wedding ceremony, Novruz Holiday gift is more interesting than the other ones. Holiday gift should be brought on last Tuesday of Novruz. The red dress, or shawl, and jewelry, horned rams with henna and red band on the head are brought for the bride. They also bring a pie, pakhlava, nuts - hazelnuts, innab, date-filled trays decorated with candles and samani.

=== Dowry ===
Girl's mother prepares dowry for her daughter for several years. Several days before wedding ceremony, they bring dowry of the bride to boy's home. Dowry is consist of at least bedroom furniture, home accessories and personal belongings of girl. Some of the relatives of girl comes to decorate girl's room. Mother-in-law of girl gives the gift to her for decorating the room.

=== Kebin (Religious marriage registering) ===
Religious marriage registering takes place a few days before the wedding ceremony. One person as a witness from both sides must present on this registering. After the establishment of the Soviet Union in Azerbaijan, the public has started preferring the form of marriage by the state. Usually, it is registered by Mullah. People were giving money and one sugar loaf which was 8 kg in weight.

=== Xinayaxdi (Henna Night) ===
Girls gather in one of the rooms. One of bride relatives takes henna and starts dancing in the middle of the room. Then she brings a tray and an empty box and puts them in front of the one of groom's relatives. This relative puts money into the empty box and takes the henna. She comes to the bride with dancing then the bride's fingers and feet are smeared in henna ("henna ceremony"). Then henna is brought in front of everybody. Everybody smears henna and gives namar. Then the jewelry that the groom's relatives brought was presented to everybody.

Meanwhile, a girl from bride's side brings a "2 color" tea to the groom and his friends. They also drink tea and put a namar (according to Azerbaijani traditions, namar is a candle, money, or little gift which is collected in wedding, or engagement ceremony) on an empty tray. One of the girls brings the henna and the boys are sliding their little finger into the henna.

=== Wedding ===
The bride writes the names of her single friends under her shoes on the wedding day. According to the tradition, when the wedding is over, the person whose name is deleted will be the next bride. The groom, his friends, and relatives come to the bride's house for carrying the bride to the wedding place, in a fancy and luxurious car decorated with bands and flowers. They carry a mirror and candles that are believed to represent happiness. Before Bride leaves the father's house, the red ribbon is closed to the waist by the groom's father or brother. Then the bride goes around the lamp three times. Bride's parents wish to couple all the best. At this moment a little boy of bride home runs and closes the door. It is said “Qapibasma”. Bride and "brotherhood" give him a namar and they open the door. Bride leave the house under the music of “Vağzalı”.

=== Beliefs after wedding ===
When the bride arrives at the groom's house, Plate is put under her feet for breaking. This is a sign of becoming a housewife. She sits on a chair and a boy child is given to her arms so that she has a baby boy soon.

== Funeral ceremony ==
When a person dies, he is laid to the south, his body is covered with black cloth which is the symbol of mourning, and a mirror is put on his chest. Local people believed that not only the external appearance but also the internal nature is reflected in the mirror, in other words, the spirit. It is supposed that the reflection of the person in the mirror also has a spirit. By putting a mirror in front of the dead body, the reflection of the body with spirit is returned to the dead body so that it does not hurt people living there. The custom of putting a mirror on the chest is differently described in the southwest of the country: A mirror protects the deceased person because the spirit has already left the body.

Of course, it is prayed a lot for the dead person. If the person could not be buried because of dying at the end of the day, the lamp is lit next to him. The relatives of the deceased (not only women) will be with him all night long.

Generally, once the person dies, everyone: relatives, friends, neighbors swarm to his home. The dead body needs to be washed and if there is a mosque nearby, the dead body is washed there. Washing exactly in the mosque is not so important. Then the corpse is worn a white garment which is longer in case of women body. They wrap the lower part of the garment with white cloth and then they cover all of this with a white shroud.

Muslims do not use coffins. They carry the corpse in a stretcher or in an open box made of wood. Usually, sons or brothers of the deceased carry him on their shoulders or other close relatives in case of absence. Women are never involved in funerals. They can visit the grave only the next day, not on a funeral day.

The mullah reads prayers to God all the way to the cemetery and asks for the forgiveness of the deceased's soul. If the age of the deceased is less than six, prayer is not performed. It is believed that child is innocent and his place is already Paradise, thus there is no reason to pray for the salvation of the child's soul.

When the grave is being covered with soil, the deceased's son or brother should stand in direction of the grave so that the deceased is not feeling loneliness.

Anyone who touches the corpse should be absolutely ablution after funerals. The music is turned off in cars, even in buses when they pass near the cemetery.

Mourning continues after coming back from funerals. On the burial day only tea, sweets and halvah are given to people. Halvah is made of flour, oil, and sugar. Halvah can also be cooked for some holidays.

Nobody is invited to the funeral, they join themselves. The funeral is also held on the 3rd and 7th day of the deceased. Mullah take part in all funerals and led to funeral prayers.

Not only halvah is given to people at funerals but also plov and meat dishes. On that day a special cleaning ritual is held: blanket and mattress of deceased is cleaned.

Everyone can go to the home of the deceased for condolences until the 40th day every Friday and they can drink a cup of tea with halvah. Until 40th-day relatives of the deceased are considering mourning days. No one wears jewellery; however, they wear black dresses. Men are not shaving. Relatives are not going to any festivals of parties during those 40 days. Neighbors also turn off the loud music. Even the corpse's relatives who are engaged must wait one year for their wedding.

== See also ==
- Culture of Azerbaijan
- Azerbaijani cuisine
