= Gürzə =

Type of dumpling originating in Azerbaijan

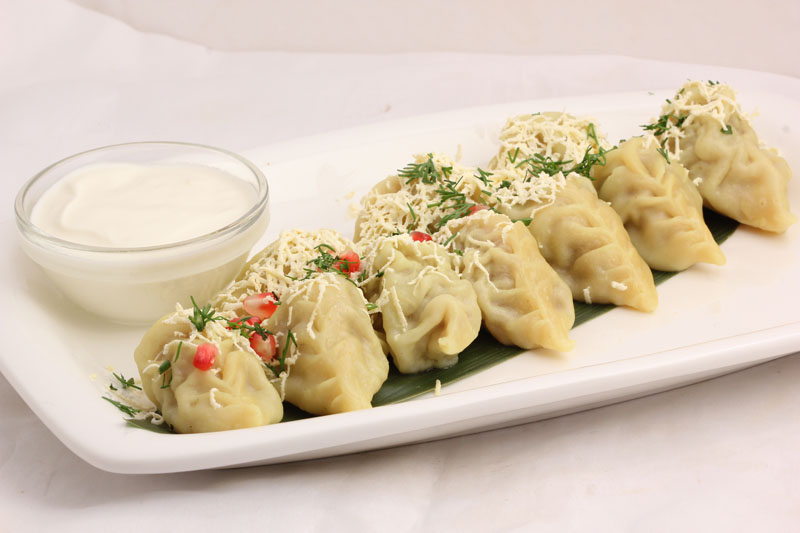
- Type: Dumpling
- Place of origin: Azerbaijan
- Main ingredients: Flour, lamb, onion
- Ingredients generally used: Yogurt or sour cream, garlic

Gürzə is a variation of Azerbaijani dumplings consisting of a filling wrapped in 1 mm thin dough circle cuts of 5 cm diameter. It originates in Azerbaijan and is a part of Azerbaijan national cuisine. The filling is made from minced fatty lamb and onion, pre-fried before filling. Gürzə are formed as small cylinders with an open top, boiled for several minutes, strained, seasoned with cinnamon and served with yogurt or sour cream mixed with crushed garlic. In some regions of Azerbaijan gürzə dumplings are boiled in lamb stock and served as a soup, seasoned with chopped fresh parsley and served with vinegar mix and crushed garlic. The name "Gürzə" is associated with the Azerbaijani name for the Caucasian meadow viper (Vipera lotievi) and given due to the wrapper sealing technique, which resembles cornrow pattern on the snake’s skin.
