= Doghramaj =

Azerbaijani and Tat Iranian cold soup

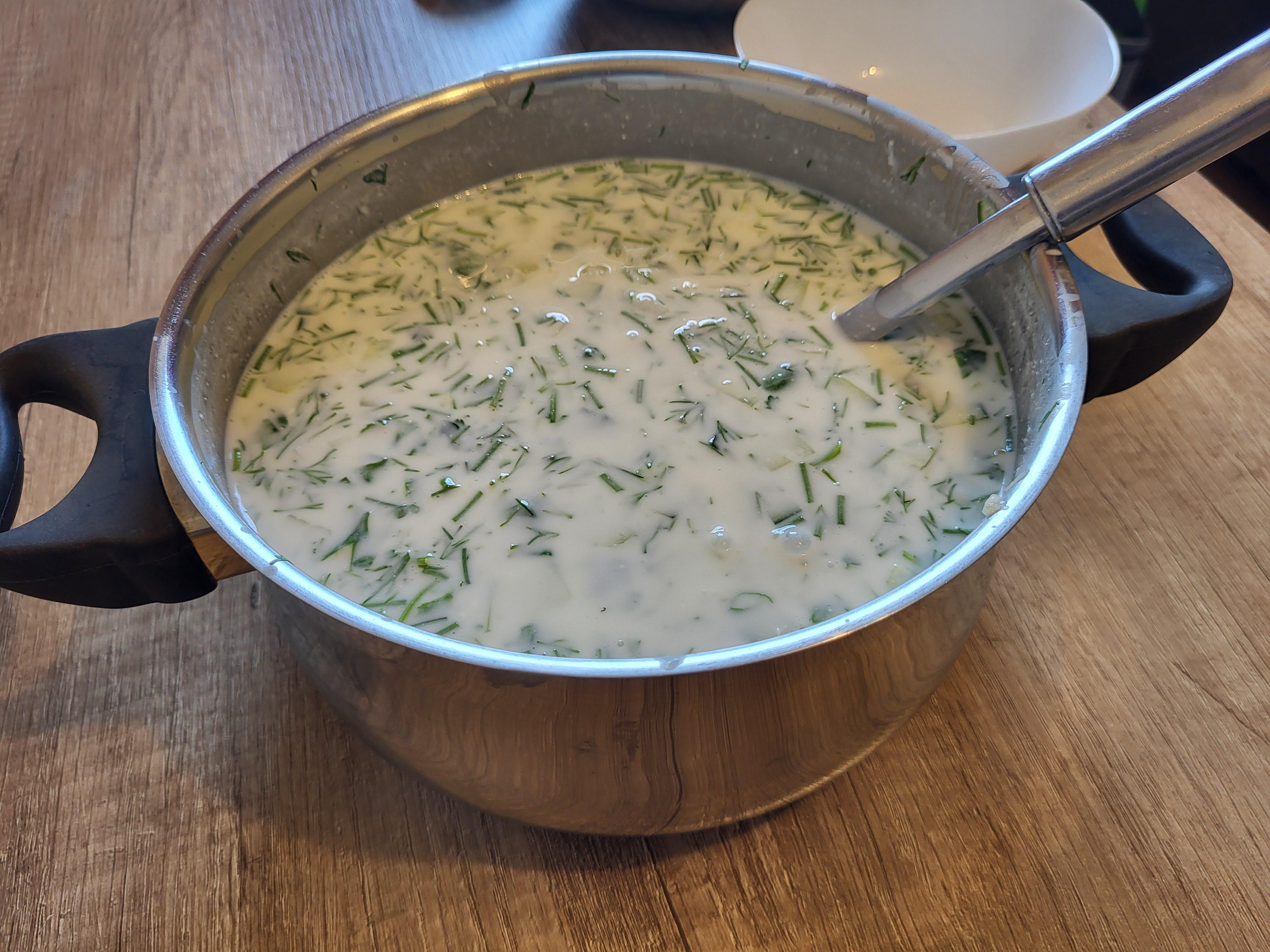
- Classic Doghramaj
- Alternative names: Ovdukh, Bozdamash, Atlama
- Type: Soup
- Place of origin: Azerbaijan (Tat people)
- Region or state: Caucasus, South Azerbaijan
- Associated cuisine: Azerbaijani, Tat
- Serving temperature: Cold
- Main ingredients: Raw vegetables, Ayran, garlic
- Similar dishes: Okroshka, Dovga

Doghramaj (Azerbaijani: Doğramac) or Ovdukh (Azerbaijani: Ovduq; Muslim Tat: Ov Dug) is a cold Azerbaijani and Tat soup. It is a version of the Russian soup Okroshka, with minor differences separating the two, and similar to another warm soup from the territory of Azerbaijan, Dovga.

== Etymology ==
The classic Azerbaijani version is called Doğramac which translates to something like chopped, coming from the word doğramaq (chopping/cutting), or Ovduq, which literally translates to Water (Ov) and Buttermilk (Dug) in the Tat language.
