= Sheki halva =

Azerbaijan dessert

Sheki halva Şəki Halvası
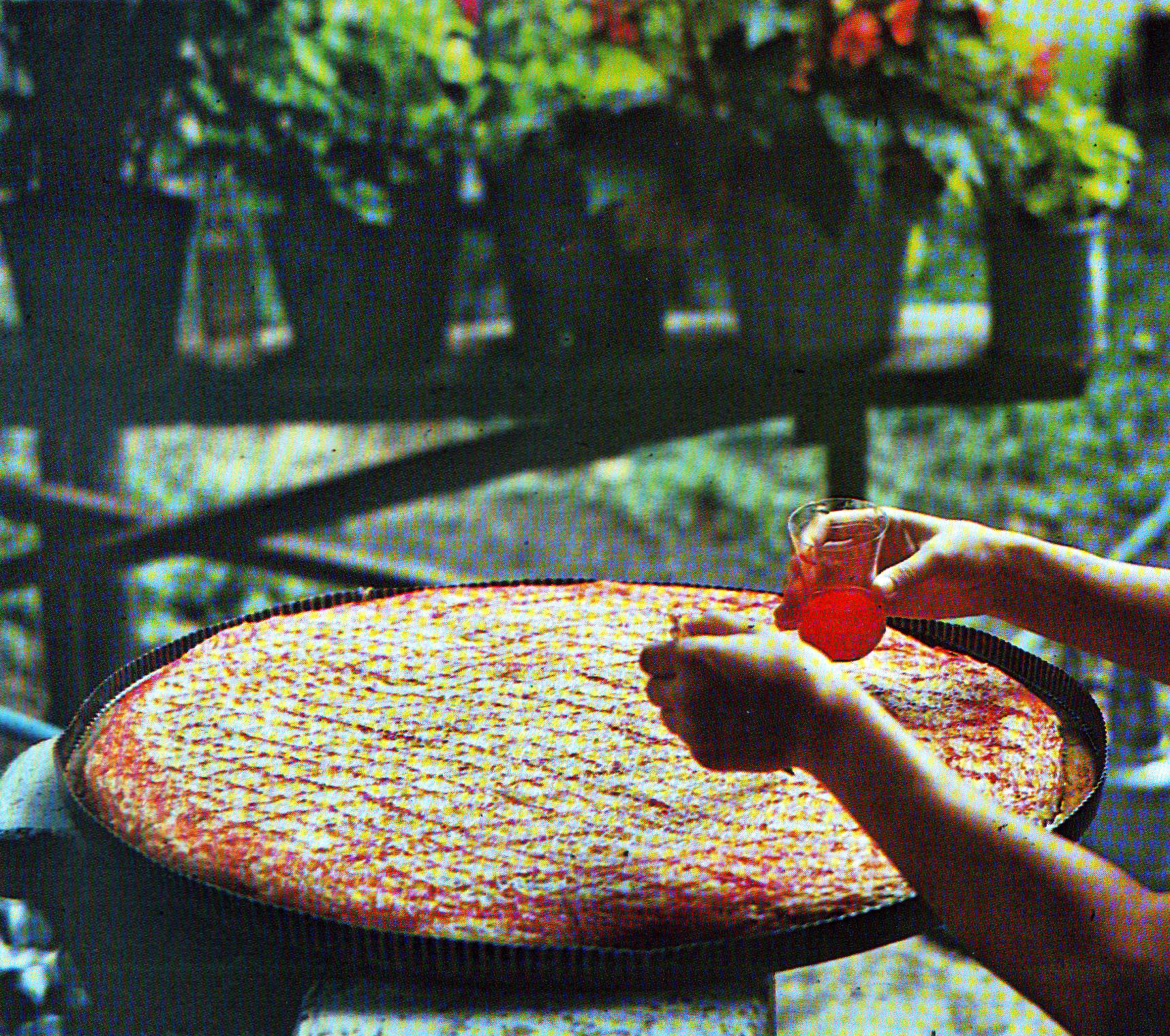
- Sheki halva on a round tray
- Alternative names: Sheki pakhlava
- Type: Dessert
- Place of origin: Azerbaijan
- Associated cuisine: Azerbaijani and Avar
- Serving temperature: Warm
- Main ingredients: Rice flour; Sugar; Hazelnuts; Coriander seeds; Cardamom; Saffron; Syrup

Sheki halva (Azerbaijani: Şəki halvası) or Sheki pakhlava (Azerbaijani: Şəki paxlavası) is a type of dessert specific to the Sheki region of Azerbaijan.

== Origin ==
Origin stories include that it was prepared by cooks of the Sheki khan, who loved sweet desserts and ordered their cooks to make something very sweet. The cooks then prepared Sheki halva, and it became very popular in this region. Another story explains that halva emerged via Mashadi Huseyn, a merchant from Tabriz, who came to Sheki and spread the recipe.

== Ingredients ==
The main ingredients are rice flour, sugar, peeled hazelnuts, coriander seeds, cardamom, and saffron. Traditionally the rice flour must be ground in a water mill.

== Preparation ==
Sheki pakhlava is made by pastry professionals, known as halvachi, and is not traditionally made at home. It is a daylong process.

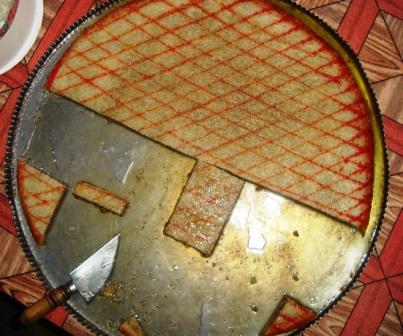
Top layer of rishta decorated with saffron

Sheki pakhlava has three main parts: the rishta, a thin webbing of dough; the stuffing; and syrup. The rishta is made by pouring kneaded batter onto a hot griddle through a special funnel in with eleven holes, moving it to form a web, and to bake very quickly.

Stuffing is made of crumbled hazelnuts, ground cardamom and coriander seeds. After placing 8–10 rishta layers on a round copper tray, the stuffing is added and then it is covered with 5–10 rishta layers. The top layer is decorated with saffron in a square shape reminiscent of shabaka. It is generally baked over charcoal for 10–20 minutes. Hot sherbet syrup is poured on Sheki halva before leaving it to rest over 8–10 hours.

== See also ==
- Sheki
- Azerbaijani pakhlava
