= Okroshka =

Russian cold soup

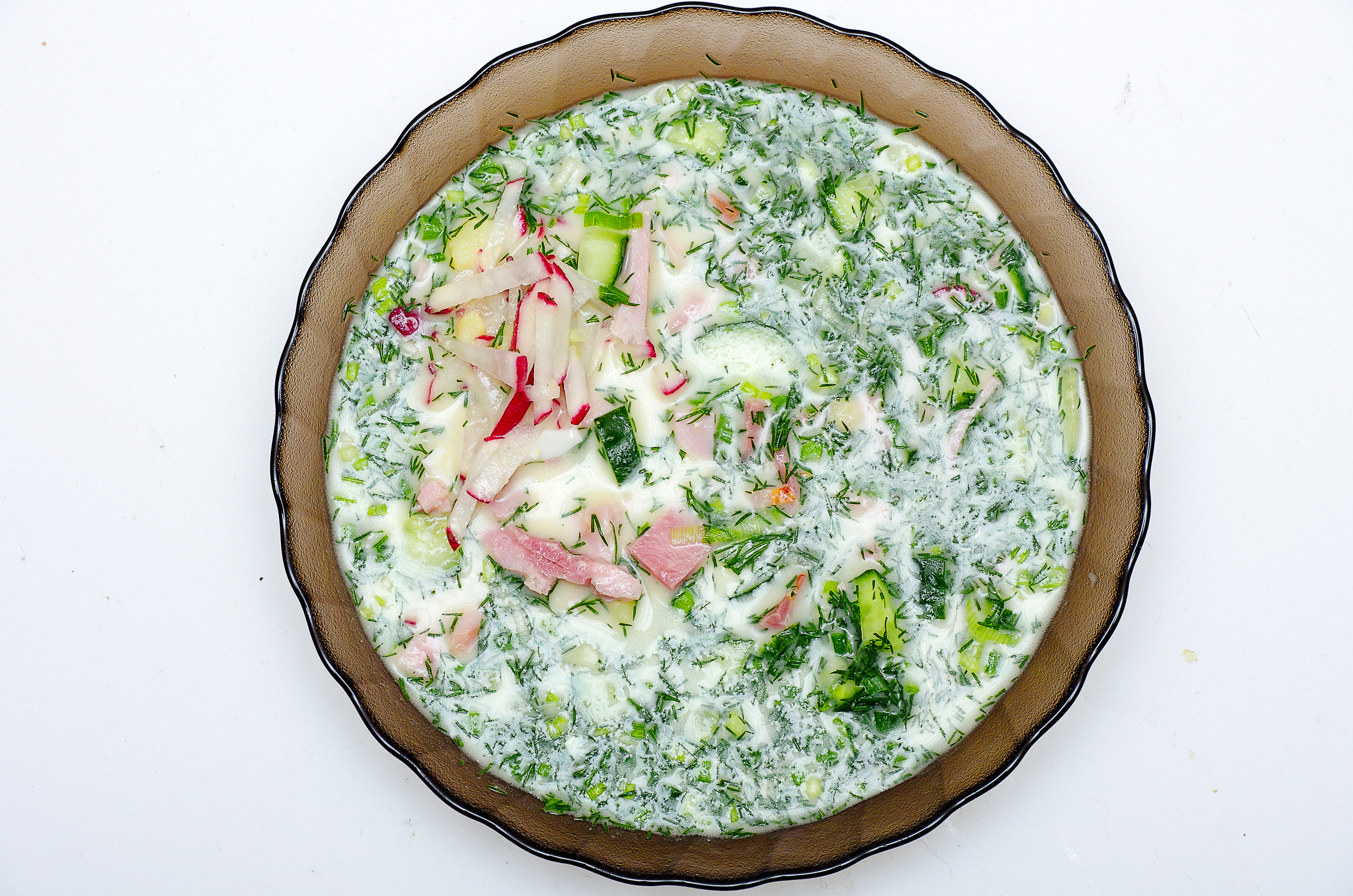
- Okroshka made with kefir
- Type: Soup
- Place of origin: Russia
- Region or state: Eastern Europe and North Asia
- Created by: Russian people
- Serving temperature: Cold
- Main ingredients: Raw vegetables (cucumbers, spring onions), radishes, boiled potatoes, eggs, meat (beef, veal, sausages, or ham), kvass, sour cream
- Similar dishes: Doghramaj

Okróshka (Russian: окро́шка [ɐˈkroʂkə]) is a cold soup of Russian origin, which probably originated in the Volga region.

The classic soup is a mix of mostly raw vegetables (like cucumbers, radishes and spring onions), boiled potatoes, eggs, cooked meat such as beef, veal, sausages or ham, and kvass, which is a low-alcoholic (1.5% or less) beverage made from fermented black or rye bread. Okroshka is usually garnished with sour cream (smetana). Later versions that first appeared in Soviet times use light or diluted kefir, whey, ayran, or carbonated water instead of kvass.

The ingredients are diced and then mixed with kvass just before eating; the ratio of chopped food to kvass is similar to that of cereal to milk. This allows the vegetables to retain their texture. For that same reason, even though the ingredients are similar to those in a Russian salad, the taste of okroshka is quite different from that of the salad.

Okroshka is mostly served in summer because the soup combines the refreshing taste of kvass and the lightness of a salad. Salt and sugar can be added according to taste. In the recipes with carbonated water, there is one more addition to the ingredients of okroshka: freshly squeezed lemon juice; this is to replace the flavor in the absence of kvass.

Okroshka is always served cold. Sometimes ice cubes are added to keep the soup cold in hot weather.

== Gallery ==
Okroshka

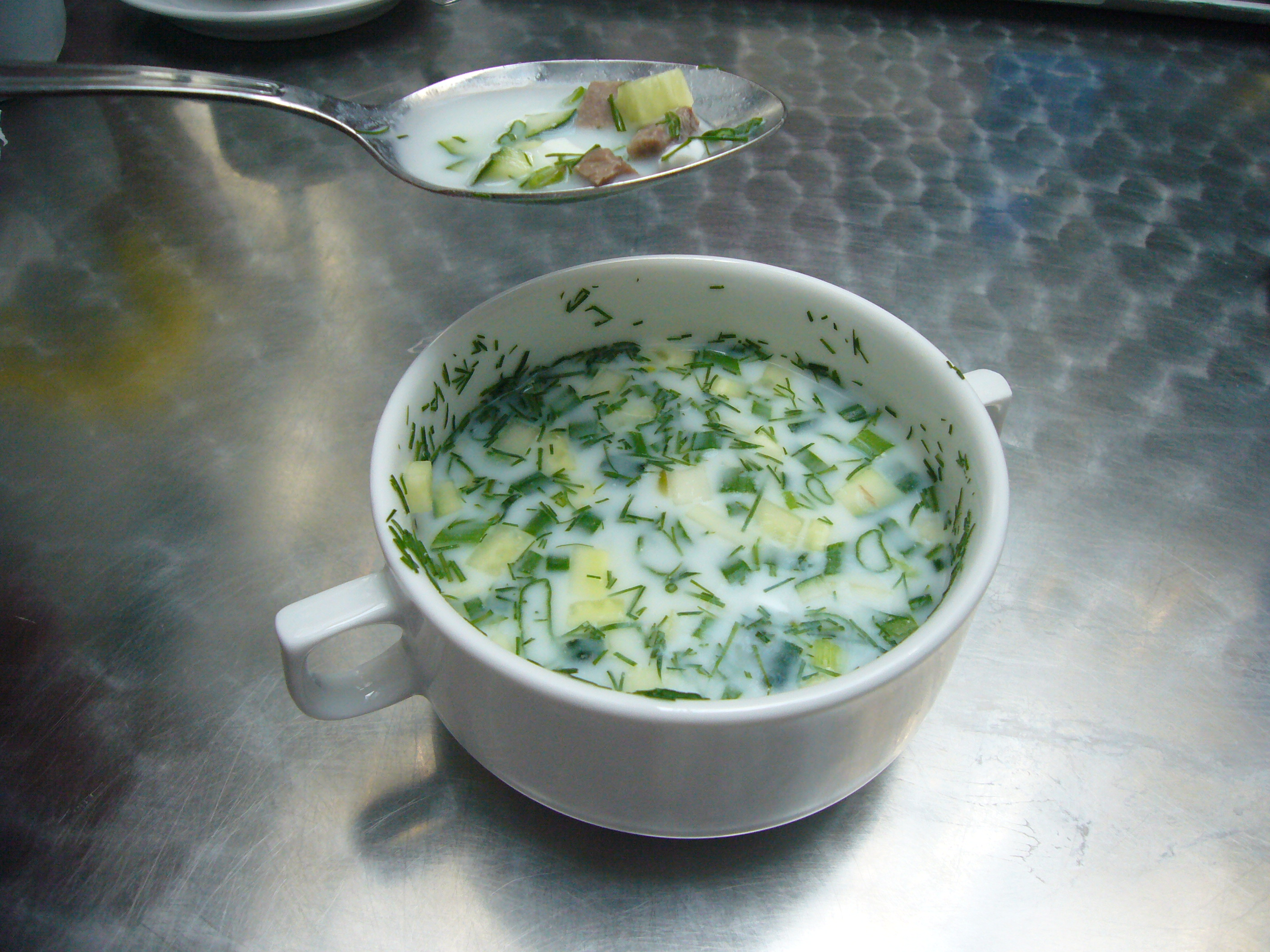
Okroshka made with kefir

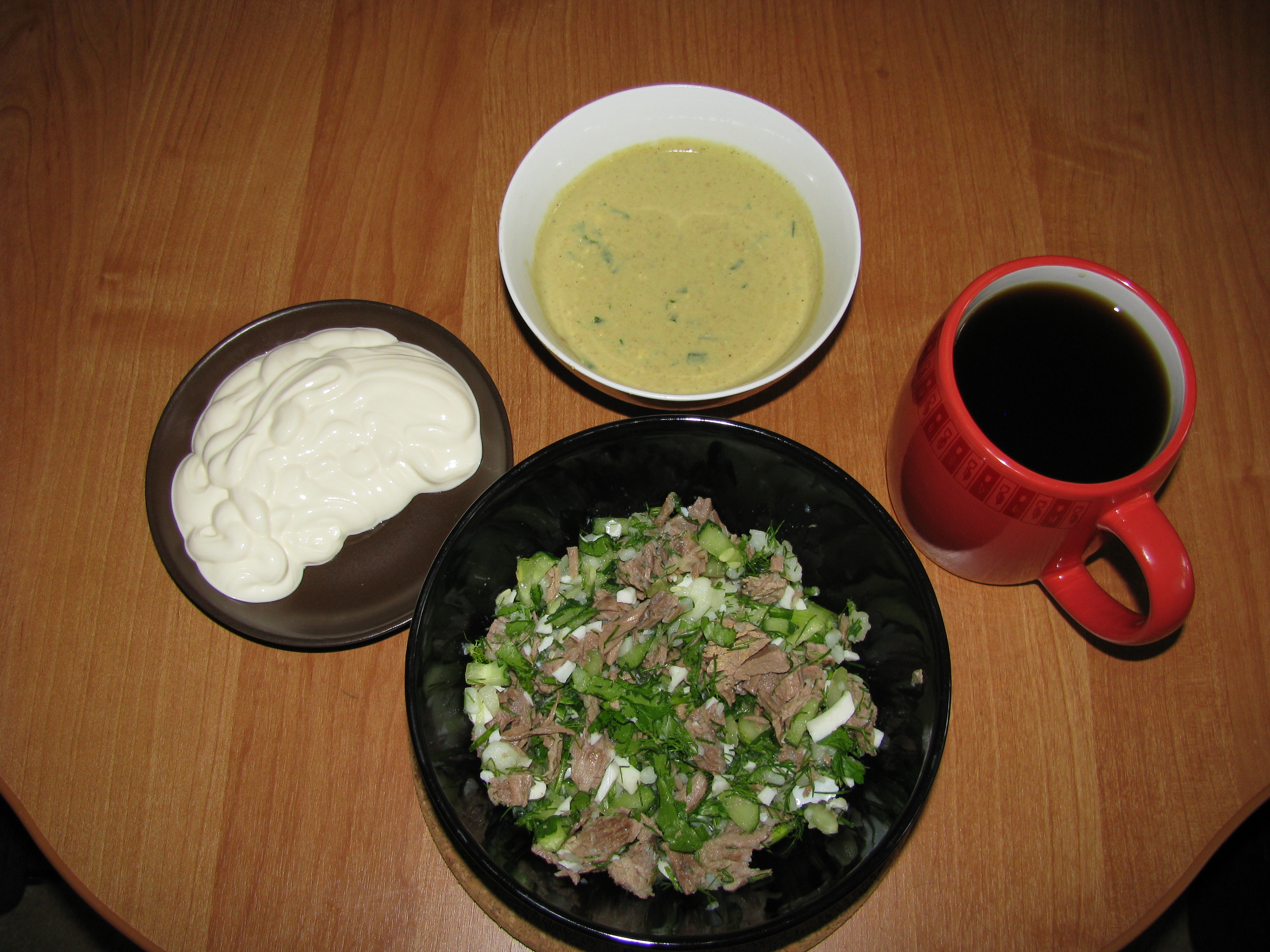
Classic okroshka with beef. Nearby are plates of smetana, a special dressing (made from pounding yolks, Russian mustard, horseradish, green onion, and salt), and a cup of kvass.

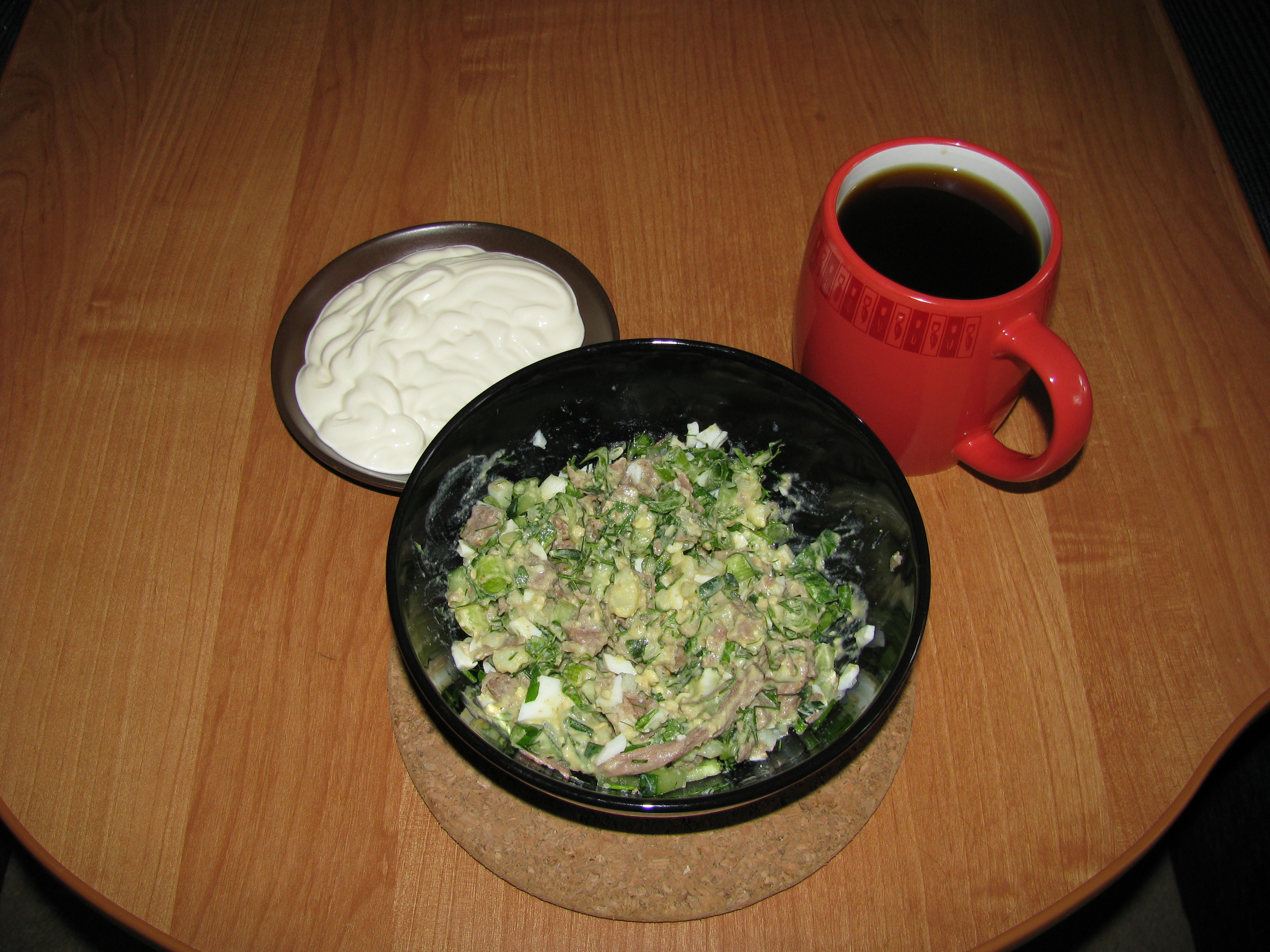
Okroshka with the dressing added

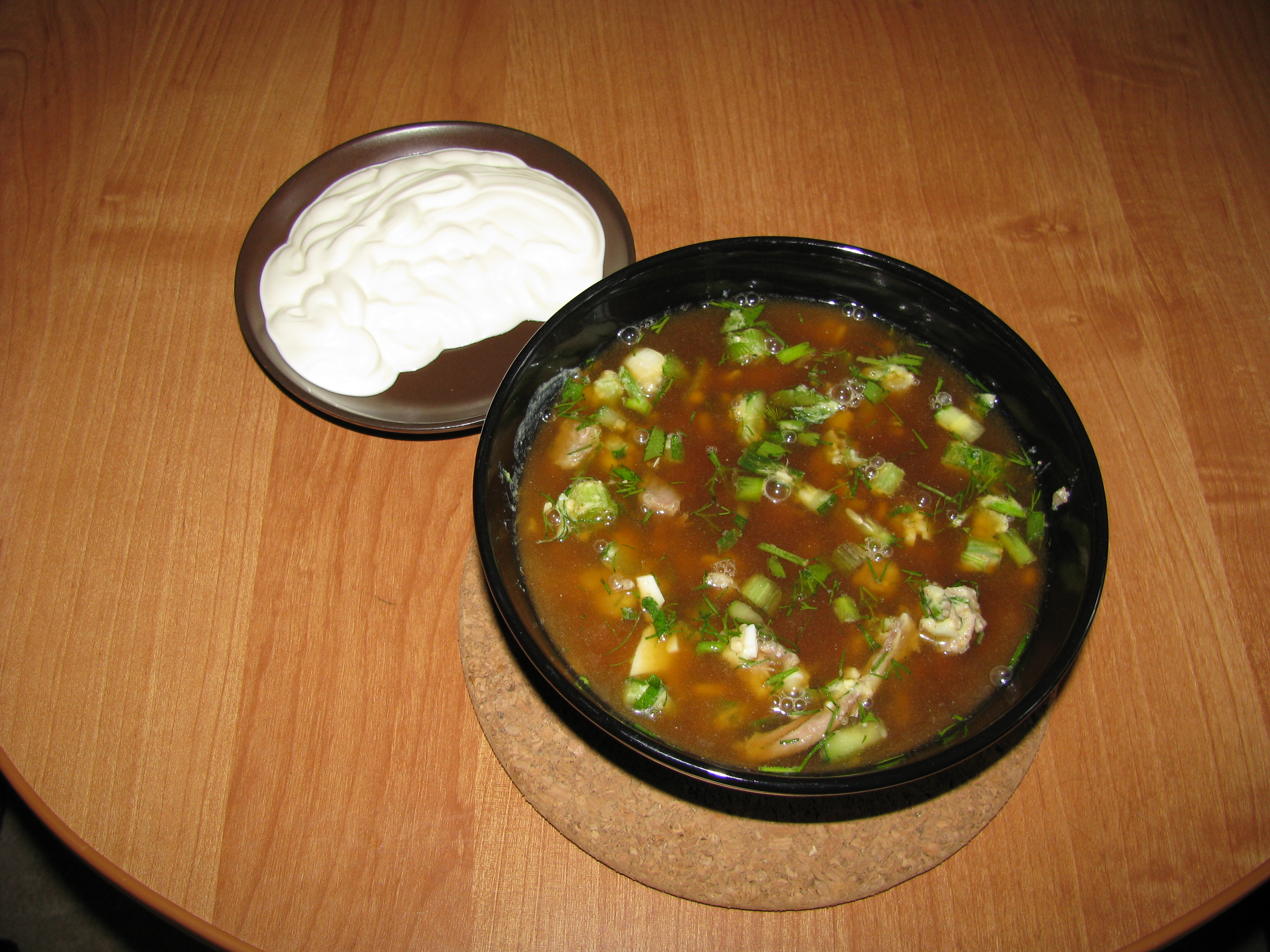
Kvass is added to the mixture.

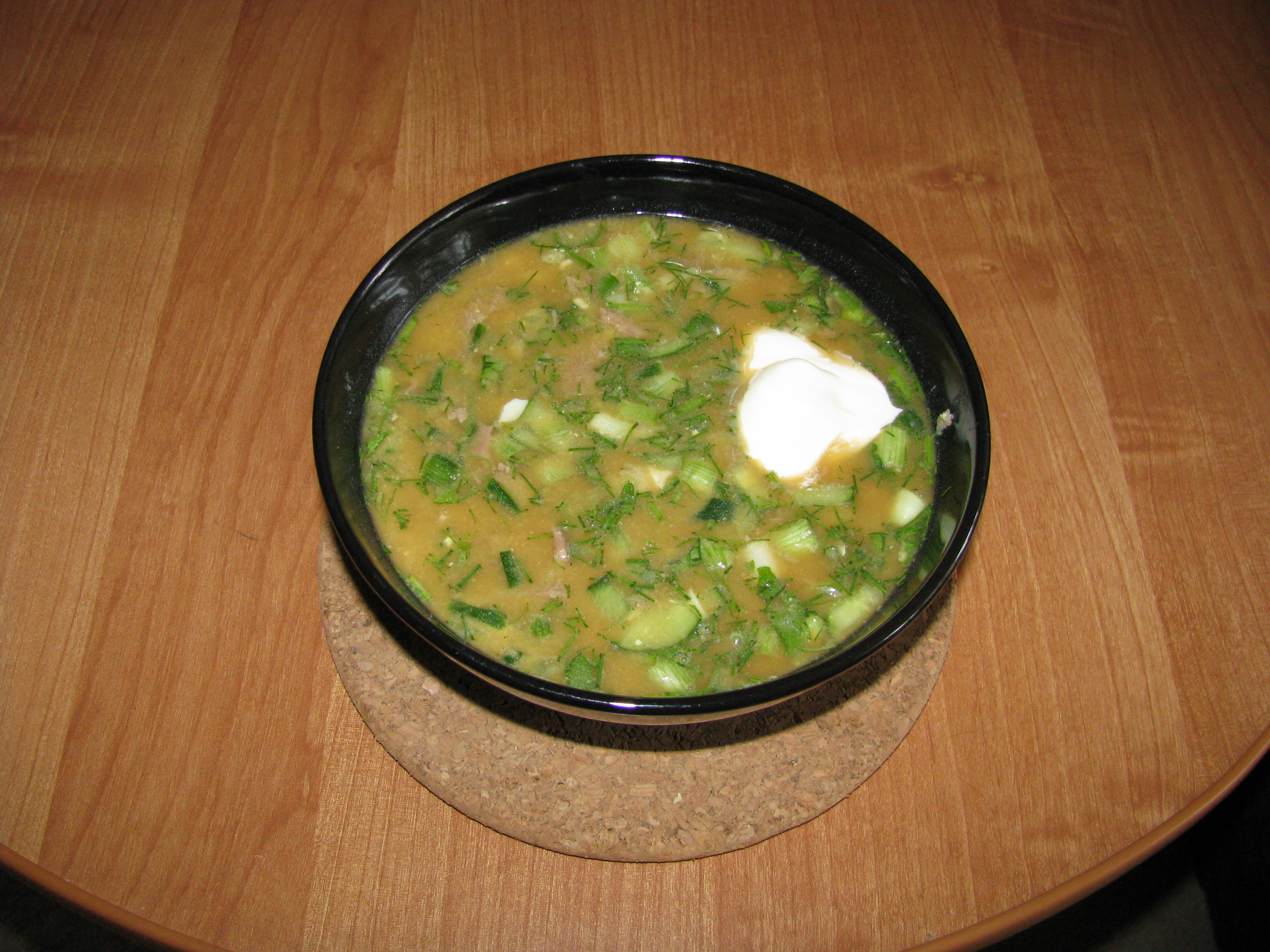
The soup is mixed and smetana is added.

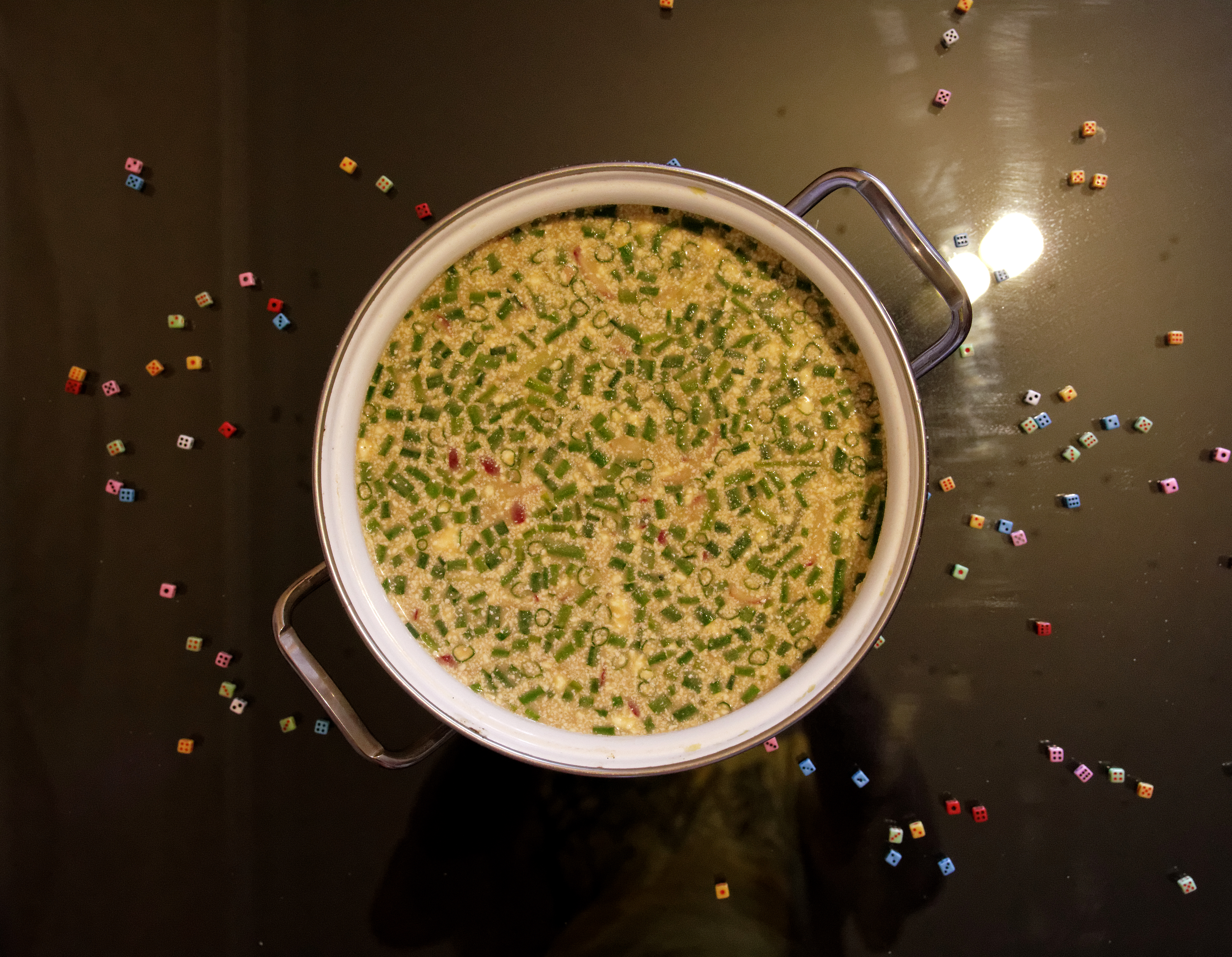
Okroshka mixed with kefir, kvass and whey

== See also ==
- List of Russian dishes
- List of soups
- List of cold soups
