= Shekerbura =

Azerbaijani sweet pastry

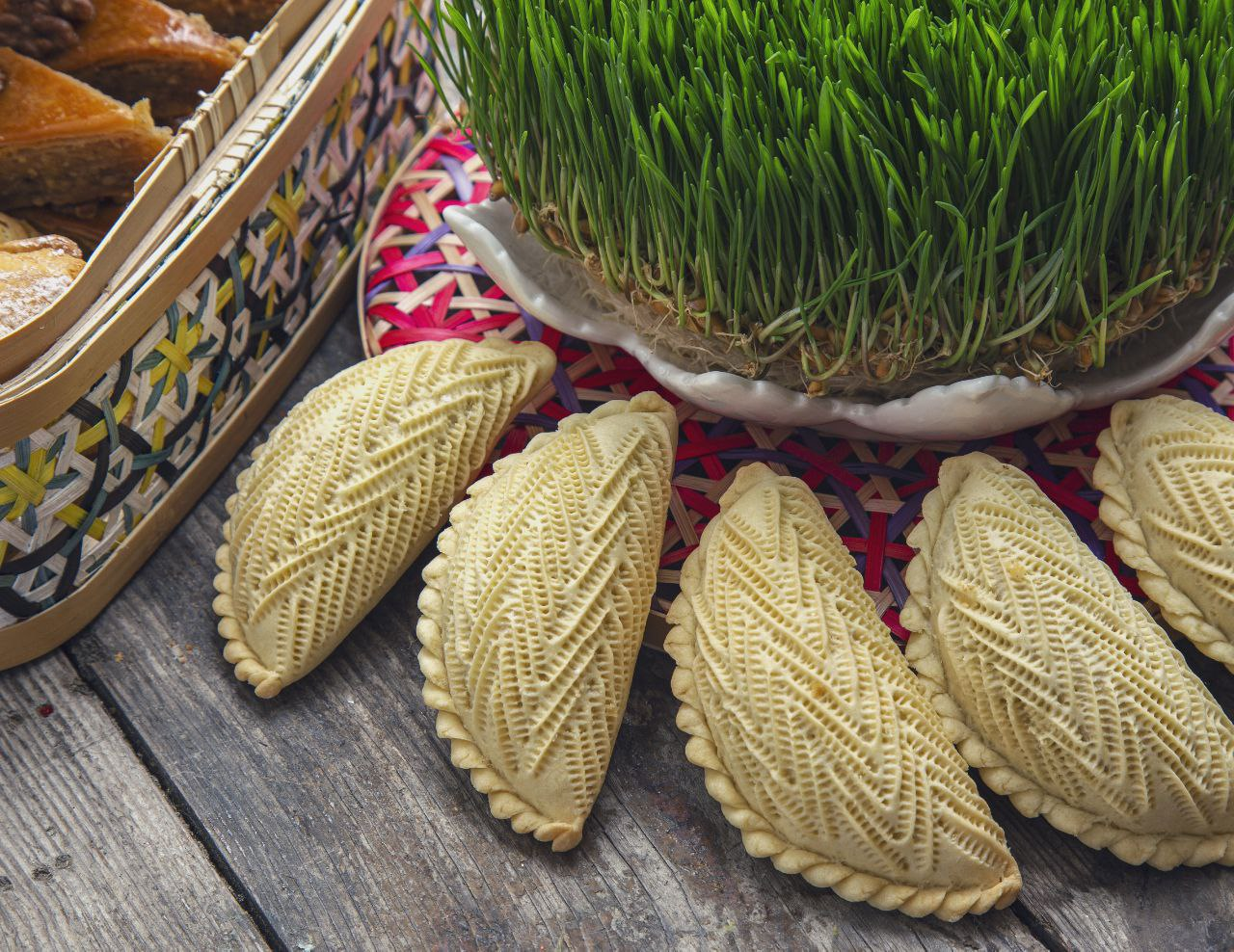
- Alternative names: Şəkərbura (Azerbaijani)
- Type: Pastry
- Place of origin: Azerbaijan
- Associated cuisine: Azerbaijani

Shekerbura or shekarbura (Azerbaijani: şəkərbura) is an Azerbaijani sweet pastry, usually eaten as a dessert. It is made in a half-moon shape, filled with ground almonds, hazelnuts, or walnuts, and sugar. Shekerbura, shorgoghal, and pakhlava are the traditional foods of Novruz in Azerbaijan.

The making of shekerbura usually involves relatives, friends and neighbors who congregate at someone's home to make it. Like other pastries prepared for Novruz, shekerbura has a symbolic meaning which denotes the half-moon or flame of fire.

== Preparation ==
The dough is made of wheat flour, butter, milk, egg yolks, cream, and yeast. The filling is prepared from peeled almond or fried nuts mixed with sugar powder. It also includes cardamom to flavor the pastry.

The dough is rolled and cut into small round shapes, then filled with stuffing and closed up by making a pattern of stitches. The stitching pattern on the dough is produced using traditional tweezers called maggash.

== Other versions ==
In Persian, it is called shekarbureh (Persian: شکربوره). Originally, it was like a halva made from sugar and almonds. Its alternate names in Persian include shekarborak, shekarbora (شکربورا), shekarpareh, shekarbozeh and shekarpirah. Variants of the dessert are also common in Azerbaijan, Iran, and Turkey.

In Anatolia, a similar pastry is called şekerpare in Turkish, which is a common dessert in Turkish cuisine. It is mainly prepared by baking soft balls of almond-based pastry dipped in thick lemon-flavored sugar syrup, different from the Azerbaijani shekerbura.

== See also ==
- Azerbaijani cuisine
- Revani
