= Shorgoghal =

Traditional Azerbaijani pastry

Shorgoghal (şorqoğal)
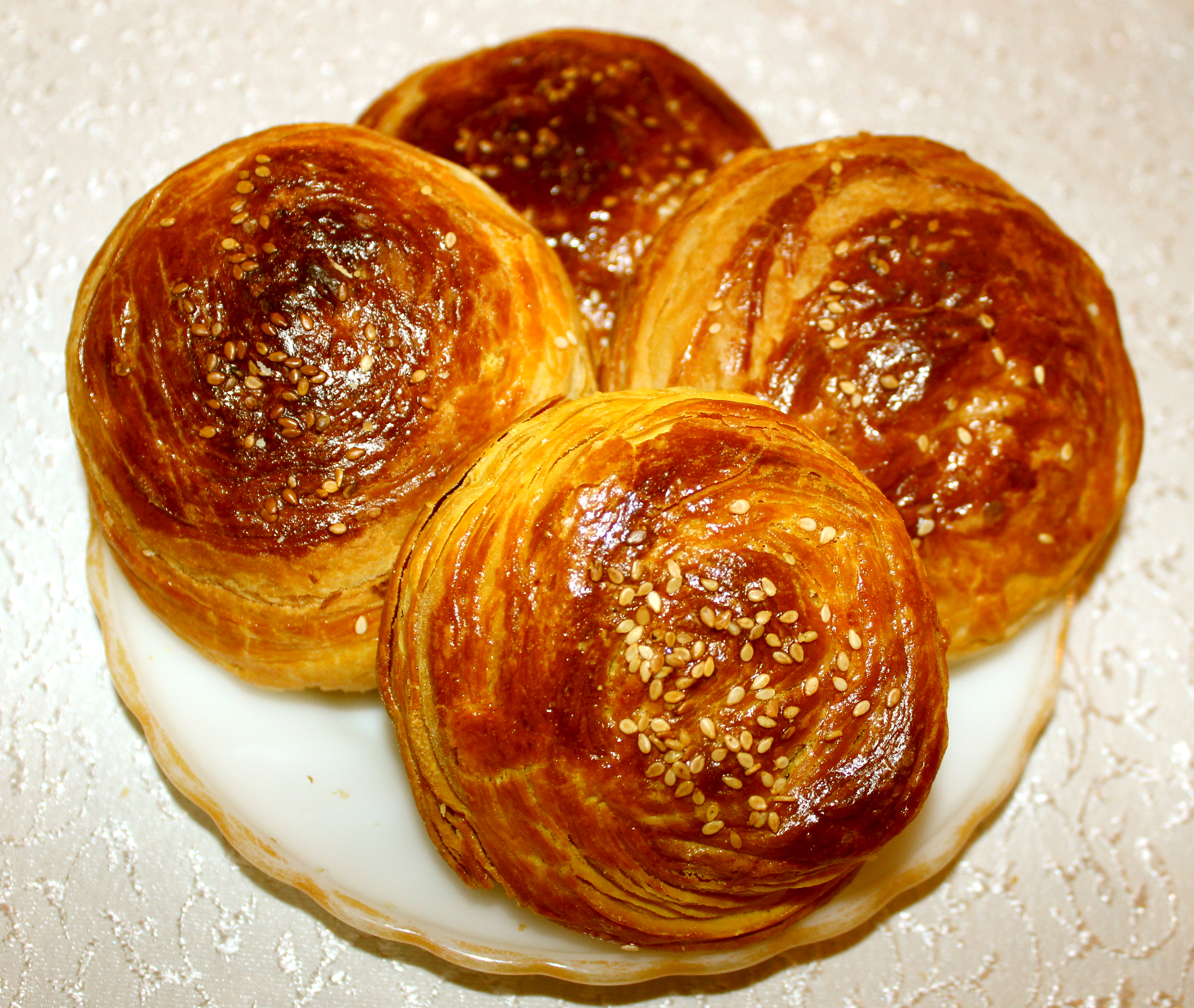
- Alternative names: Goghal
- Type: Pastry
- Place of origin: Azerbaijan
- Associated cuisine: Azerbaijani
- Serving temperature: Warm

Shorgoghal (Azerbaijani: şorqoğal) or goghal is a traditional Azerbaijani salt pastry in a round shape filled with anise or fennel seed, cumin, cinnamon, turmeric, salt and pepper. It is mainly prepared for Novruz in Azerbaijan along with pakhlava and shekerbura.

== Description ==
Goghal is a round, flaky pastry with a bright yellow top layer. It is mainly filled with a mixture of spices (called shorgoghal) or with sugar and nuts (called shirin goghal). Like other pastries prepared for Nowruz in Azerbaijan, shorgoghal has a solar symbolism. The round shape and cheerful yellow colour is inspired by the sun.

== Ingredients and preparation ==
Puff pastry dough is rested in a warm place for four hours, then enriched with heated butter, after which it is mixed well and the remaining flour is added.

Cumin is crushed and heated, then anise, cinnamon, salt and pepper are added together with warm butter for the stuffing. The mixture is cooked for five minutes.

The dough is divided into 10 pieces. The rolled-out pieces are then smeared with butter and placed on top of each other. The multilayered dough that is then formed is cut into strips, which are twisted into circles and then flattened. The dough is then stuffed with the buttery spice mixture and the top of each shorgoghal is brushed with egg yolk, coloured with saffron, and sprinkled with poppy seeds.

== See also ==
- List of pastries
