= Azerbaijani cuisine =

Culinary traditions of Azerbaijan

Azerbaijani cuisine (Azerbaijani: Azərbaycan mətbəxi) is a term describing the cooking styles and dishes of the Republic of Azerbaijan. The cuisine is influenced by the country's agriculture that mostly developed on grasslands allowing a culture of pastoralism to develop, as well as to the geographical location of the country, which is situated between Europe and Asia with access to the Caspian Sea. This location has enabled the people that now live in the territory of Azerbaijan to develop a diet rich in produce, milk products, and meat, including beef, mutton, fish and game. The location, which was contested by many historical kingdoms, khanates, and empires, also meant that Azerbaijani cuisine was influenced by the culinary traditions of multiple different cultures, including Turkic, Iranian, Armenian and Eastern European cuisines. Many dishes of Armenian cuisine and Georgian cuisine with Turkified or Turkic names are widespread in Azerbaijan.

== History and features of Azerbaijani national cuisine ==
Azerbaijan's national cuisine is arguably closer to Middle Eastern cuisine due to the taste and preparation of the dishes. Contemporary Azerbaijan cuisine retains the traditional methods of preparing dishes while incorporating modern cooking techniques.

Azerbaijani dishes have been cooked with copper utensils and cookware. Copper bowls and plates are still commonly used to serve food.

Azerbaijani cuisine utilizes fruits and vegetables such as aubergine, tomato, sweet pepper, spinach, cabbage, onion, sorrel, beet, radish, cucumber, and green beans. Rice and products made from flour are widely used. Herbs, including mint, coriander, dill, basil, parsley, tarragon, leek, chive, thyme, marjoram, scallions, and watercress often accompany main dishes. The majority of national dishes are made with lamb, beef and poultry meat. Dishes prepared of minced meat are also prevalent. The sea, lakes and rivers of Azerbaijan are abundant with different fish species, particularly the white sturgeon. The Caspian Sea is home to many edible species of fish, including the sturgeon, caspian salmon, kutum, sardines, grey mullet, and others. Caviar from the Caspian Sea is a popular ingredient in Azerbaijan.

The typical Azerbaijani meal involves three courses. One of the basic dishes of Azerbaijani cuisine is plov, served with various herbs and greens, a combination distinct from those found in Uzbek plovs. Other second courses include a variety of kebabs and shashlik, including lamb, beef, chicken, duck and fish (baliq) kebabs. Sturgeon, a common fish, is normally skewered and grilled as a shashlik, served with a tart pomegranate sauce called narsharab. Dried fruits and walnuts are used in many dishes. The traditional condiments are salt, black pepper, sumac, and saffron, which is grown on the Absheron Peninsula domestically. The third courses include soups. These include kufta bozbash, piti prepared of meat and dovga, as well as ovdukh prepared of greens and yoghurt.

Black tea is a popular beverage, and is drunk after food is eaten. It is also offered to guests as a gesture of welcome, often accompanied by fruit preserves.

== Breakfast ==
The Azerbaijani breakfast is heavy in dairy products such as butter, various types of white cheese, and cream, as well as honey, tandoori bread and eggs, sometimes prepared into kuku, but, alternatively, also scrambled. Eastern European breakfast traditions adopted under the Russian Empire and the Soviet Union are also occasionally seen in Azerbaijan households, with foods such as kasha, porridge, quark and crepes included on the breakfast table.

== Light snacks ==
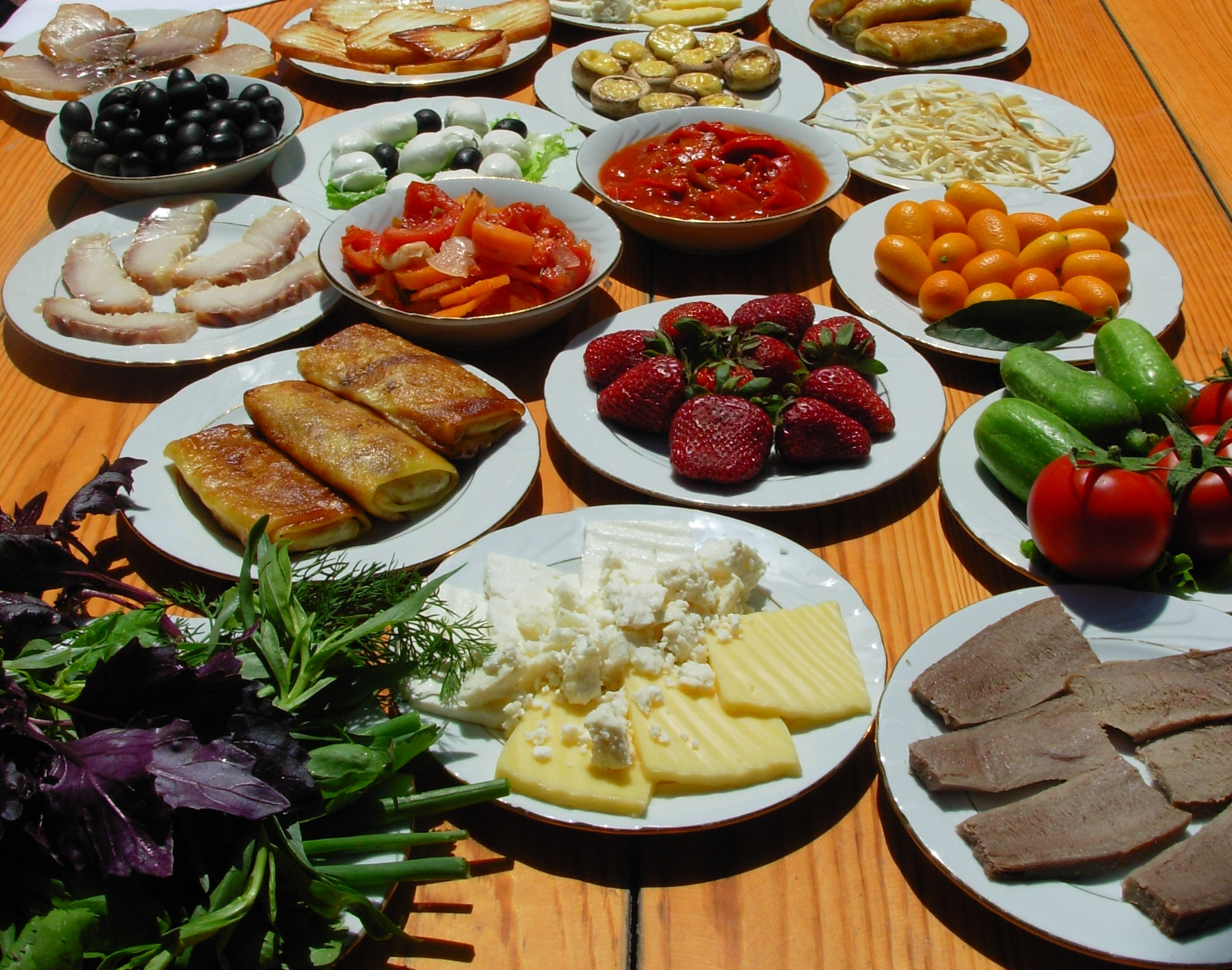
Azerbaijani light snacks

Azerbaijani cuisine has a number of light snacks and side dishes to open or accompany the main meals: a plate of green leaves called goy, pieces of chorek (bread), white cheese or qatik (sour yogurt) and turshu (pickles). This culinary tradition is comparable to Turkish meze. The richer main courses such as soups, meats and plov are served afterwards.

== Dishes ==
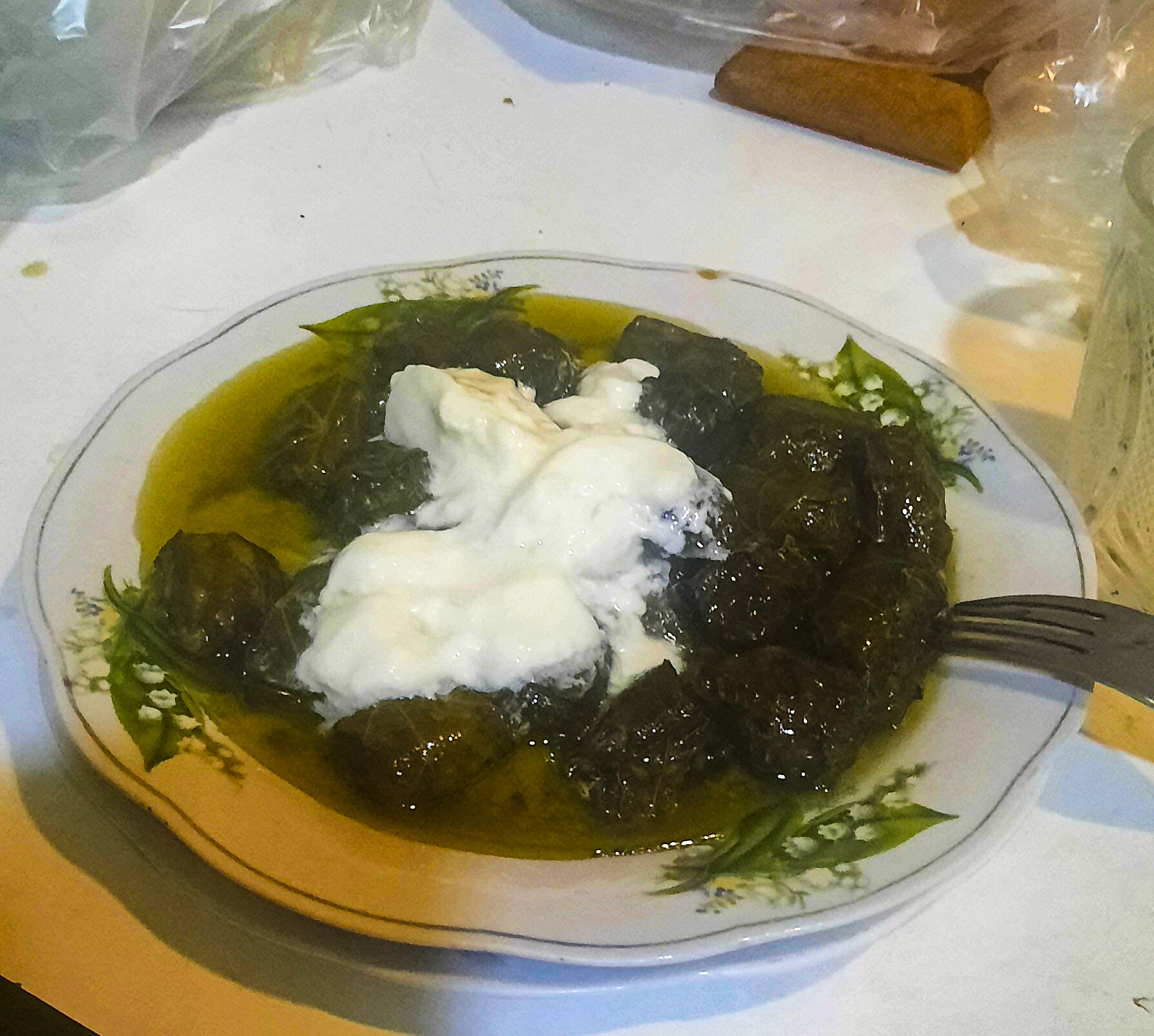
Dolma in Azerbaijan with yogurt added

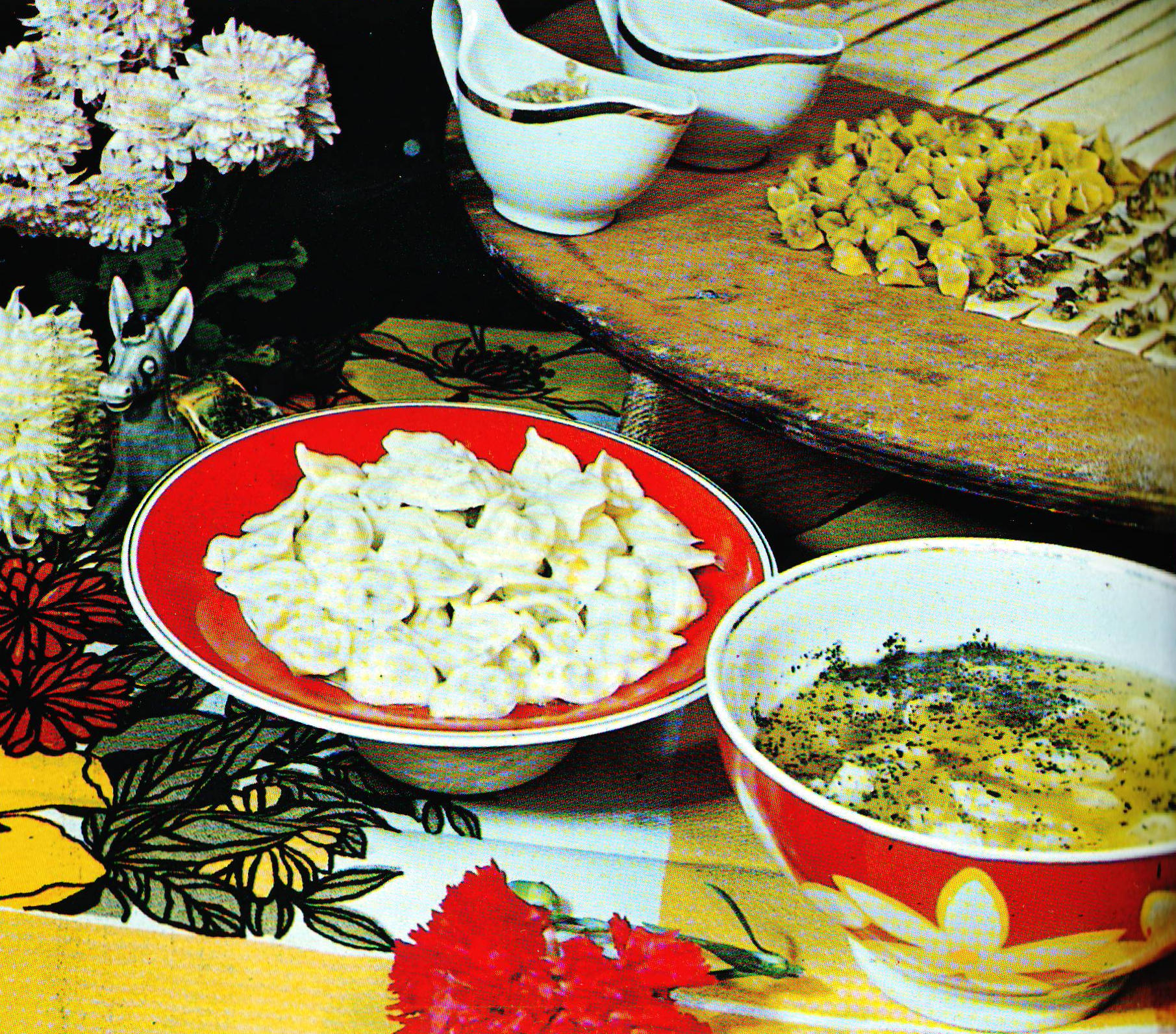
Azerbaijani dushbara

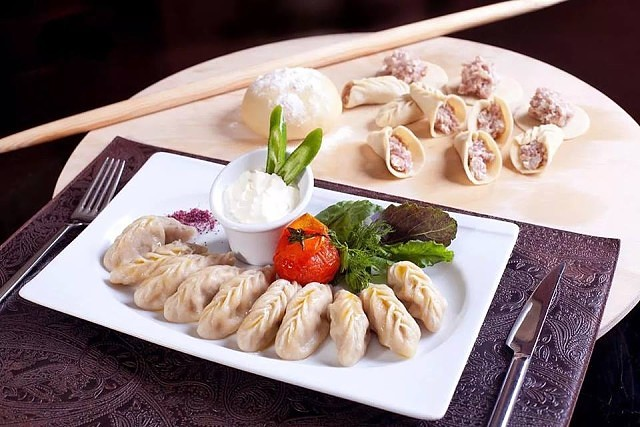
Gürzə

=== Meat ===
Azerbaijani cuisine included large amounts of beef and game. Consumption of camel meat was also widespread, although it has become increasingly rare in modern times. In order to preserve meat, it was historically jerked, or alternatively, roasted and stuffed into jars or animal stomachs. Apart from the cuts of meat, Azerbaijani cuisine features the use of heads, legs, tails and intestines of animals in numerous dishes.

Azerbaijani cuisine features a wide variety of traditional meat dishes such as bozbash (parchabozbash, kuftebozbash, qovurmabozbash), piti (sheki piti) khash, shashlik and lula kebab. A variety of lamb dishes are also commonly eaten, traditionally during celebrations such as Nowruz. Meatball dishes and forms of dolma are regularly eaten as well. On particularly special occasions, local goose, turkey, duck, quail and pheasant meats are also cooked and consumed.

Azerbaijani cuisine also features a variety of seafood, especially fish which is obtained from the Caspian Sea as well as the Kura and Aras rivers. Fish is prepared in a variety of ways: stuffed, chopped, dried, grilled, fried, boiled, cooked in the oven, cooked on skewers, cooked in tandoors, cooked into plovs, and in other ways depending on the occasion and personal preferences.

Although the population is predominately Muslim, Azerbaijani culture is largely secular. However, pork is less popular than other meats. In 2023, pork constituted about 2.4% of total meat consumption, primarily from imports.

Name	Description
Balıq	Fish, usually sturgeon, normally skewered and grilled as a kebab.
Dolma	The traditional recipe calls for minced lamb or beef mixed with rice and flavoured with mint, fennel, and cinnamon, and wrapped in vine leaves (yarpaq dolması) or cabbage leaves (kələm dolması). There are also sour sweet cabbage dolma (turş şirin kələm dolması) and eggplant dolma (qarabadımcan dolması). In 2017, UNESCO listed dolma as part of Azerbaijan's Intangible Cultural Heritage.
Badımcan dolması	Tomato, sweet pepper, and aubergine stuffed with minced lamb or beef mixed with chickpeas.
Dushbara	Small dumplings stuffed with minced lamb and herbs, served in broth.
Lavangi	Stuffed chicken or fish with onions, walnuts and raisins. A specialty of the Talysh people in southern Azerbaijan, but very difficult to find common in restaurants.
Lula kebab	A mixture of mutton, herbs, and spices squeezed around a skewer and barbecued, often served with lavash (thin sheets of unleavened bread).
Qutab	A sort of pancake turnover stuffed with minced lamb, cheese, or spinach.
Shashlik	Chunks of lamb marinated in a mixture of onion, vinegar, and spices, impaled on a large skewer and grilled on the barbecue. In Russian, it is also called shashlyk (шашлык), from Turkic shishlyk (literally, "for skewer").
Qovurma	Pieces of mutton or lamb on the bone (blade chops) stewed with onions, tomatoes, and saffron. There is also sabzi qovurma, a lamb stew with herbs.

=== Soups ===
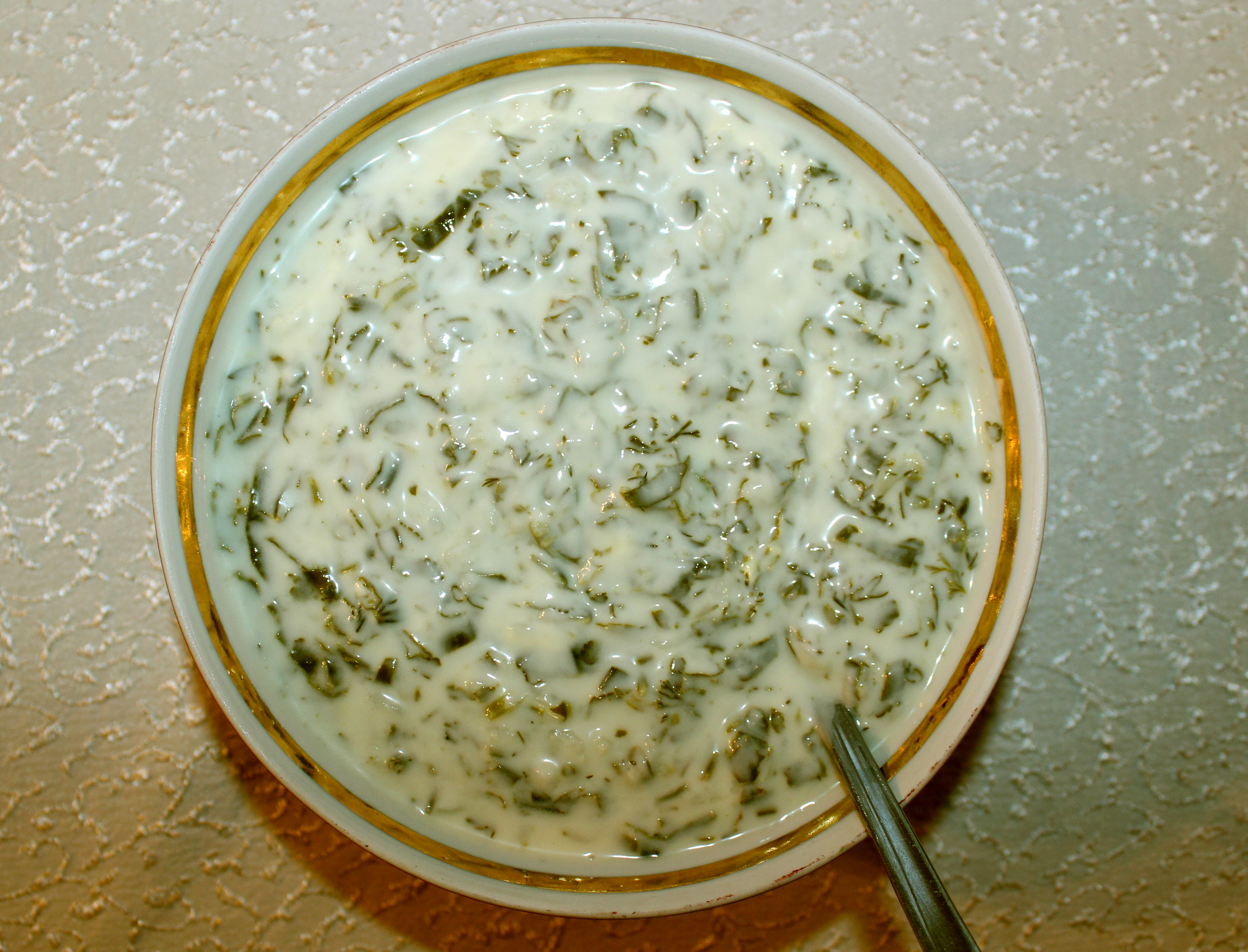
Dovga

Soups in Azerbaijan tend to have a thicker consistency and a larger ratio of dry ingredients to broth. A common feature of numerous Azerbaijani soups is that the soup serves the role of both the first and second courses – the soup is served in a large portion and the broth is drunk first as a starter, and then the dry ingredients of the soup such as the potatoes, meat, chickpeas and large vegetable chunks are consumed as a second course together with bread.

Another characteristic featured in several Azerbaijani soups is the addition of finely cut mutton tails. Tomato paste and tomato puree are rarely used in Azerbaijani soups and instead are substituted with fresh local tomatoes during the summer. During winter, local tomatoes are not widely available and are frequently substituted with dried cherries. Spices such as saffron and turmeric powder are also traditionally used in Azerbaijani soups.

Name	Description
Piti	The national soup of Azerbaijan, made from pieces of mutton on the bone, cooked with vegetables in a broth; prepared and served in individual crocks.
Kufta bozbash	A pea soup with lamb meatballs and boiled potatoes. The meatballs in kufta bozbash are large, hearty, and made of minced lamb or beef and rice, sometimes with a dried plum inside.
Dovga	A yogurt-based soup with sorrel, spinach, rice, dried peas, and small meatballs made from ground mutton; served hot or cold depending on the season.
Dogramaj	A cold soup based on a yogurt–water mixture (ayran) poured over sliced cucumbers and greens (dill, coriander, basil, tarragon, and sometimes mint).

=== Types of plov ===
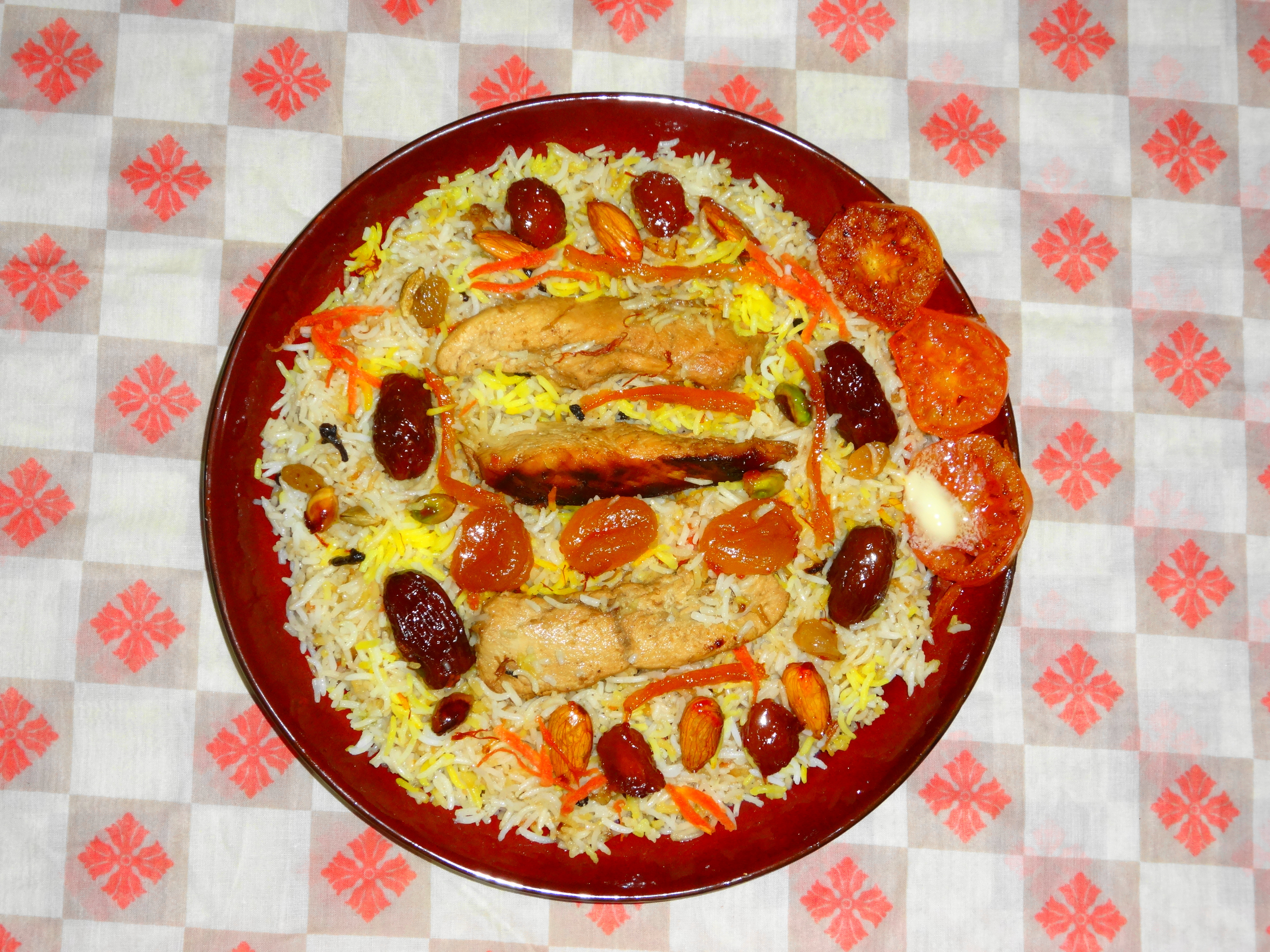
Azerbaijani pilaf. Left: gara (lamb, halved apricots, plums, apricot seeds). Right: rice (partially colored with turmeric).

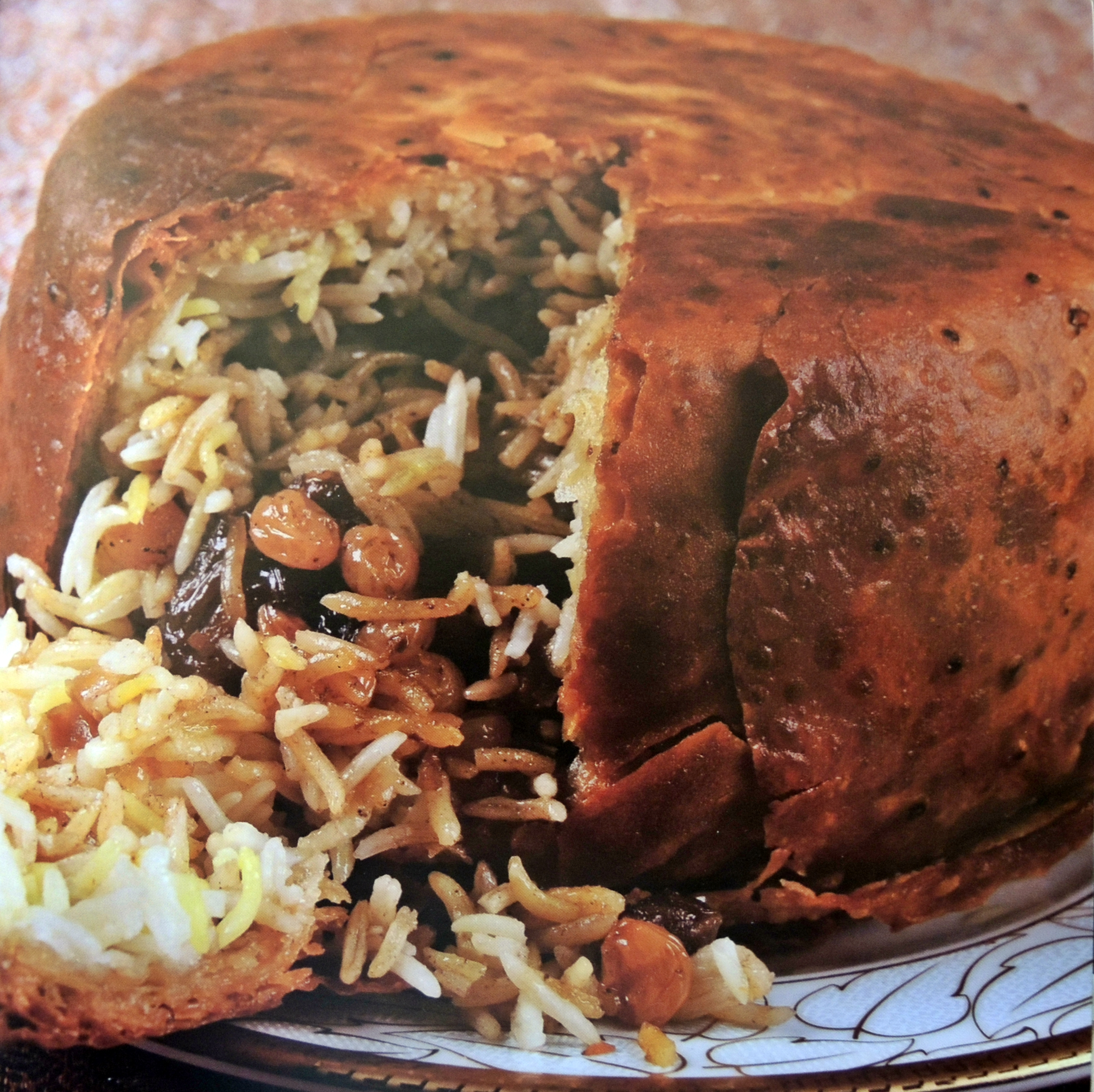
Shah pilaf

Plov is one of the most widespread dishes in Azerbaijan and there are over 200 types of plovs in Azerbaijani cuisine. They are usually prepared with local vegetables, meats and spices. In Azerbaijani tradition, it is customary that the household prepares a plov for guests visiting the house. Since plov is a heavy and fatty food, it is traditionally served together with sour drinks such as ayran or black tea with lemon juice. Plovs have different names depending on the main ingredients accompanying the rice:

Name	Ingredients
Kourma plov	Mutton plov with onion
Chilov plov	Bean plov with fish
Toyug plov	Chicken plov
Shuyudli plov	Dill plov with beef
Shirin plov	Dried fruit plov
Sheshryanch plov	Six-color plov, eggs cooked "sunny side up" on a bed of fried green and white onions.

Azerbaijani plov consists of three components, served simultaneously but on separate platters: the first component is rice (warm, never hot); the second component is gara, consisting of fried meat, dried fruits, eggs, or fish prepared as an accompaniment to rice; and the third component comprises herbs. Rice is not mixed with the other components even when eating plov.

== Spices ==
Spices play an important role in Azerbaijani cuisine, especially saffron which is used in over 50 national dishes. Other spices widely used in Azerbaijani cuisine include anise, cumin, cinnamon, thyme, coriander seeds, curcuma, sumac, caraway, bay leaves, mint, dill, parsley, celery, tarragon, and basil.

== Desserts ==
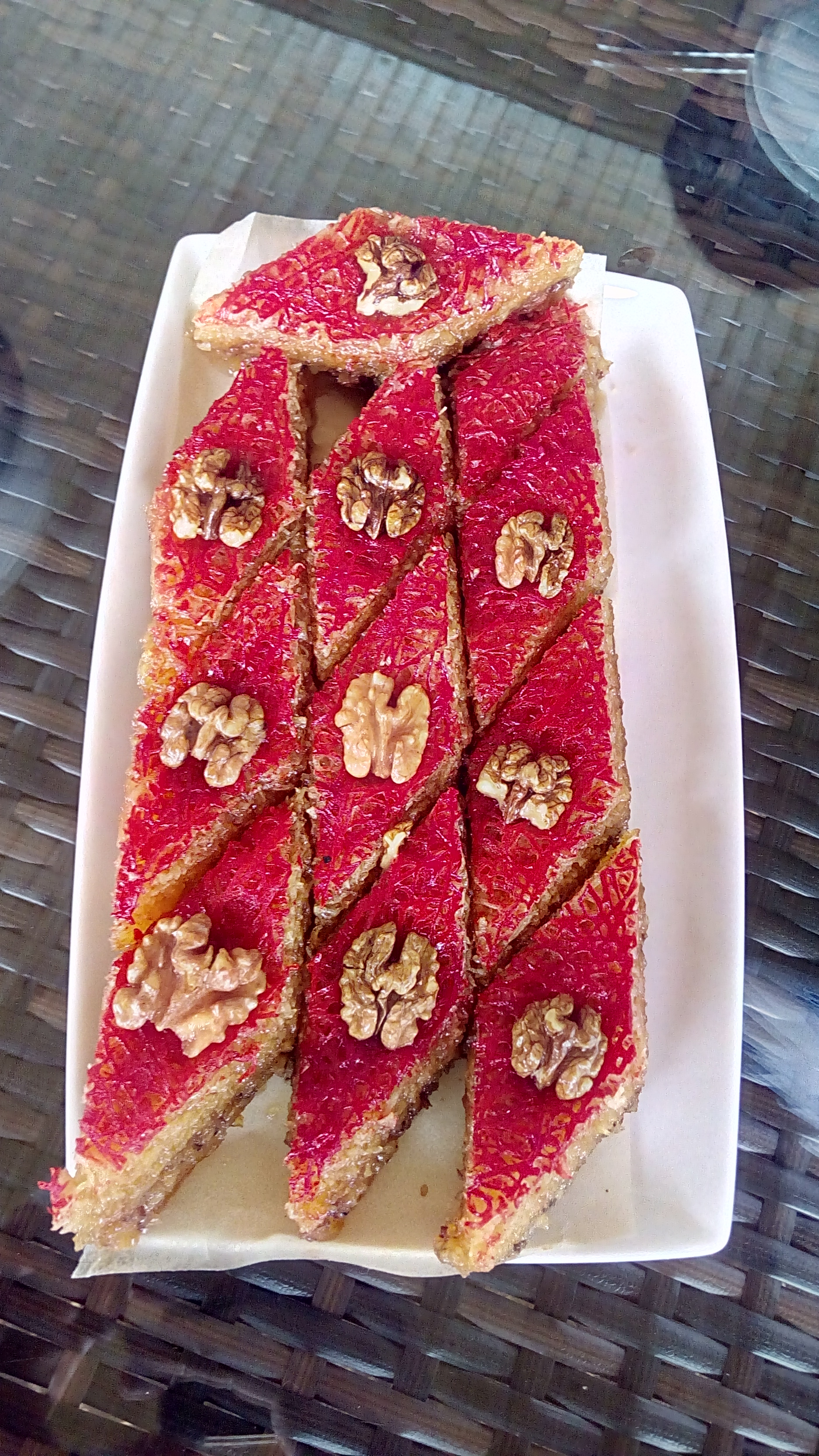
Quba pakhlavasi

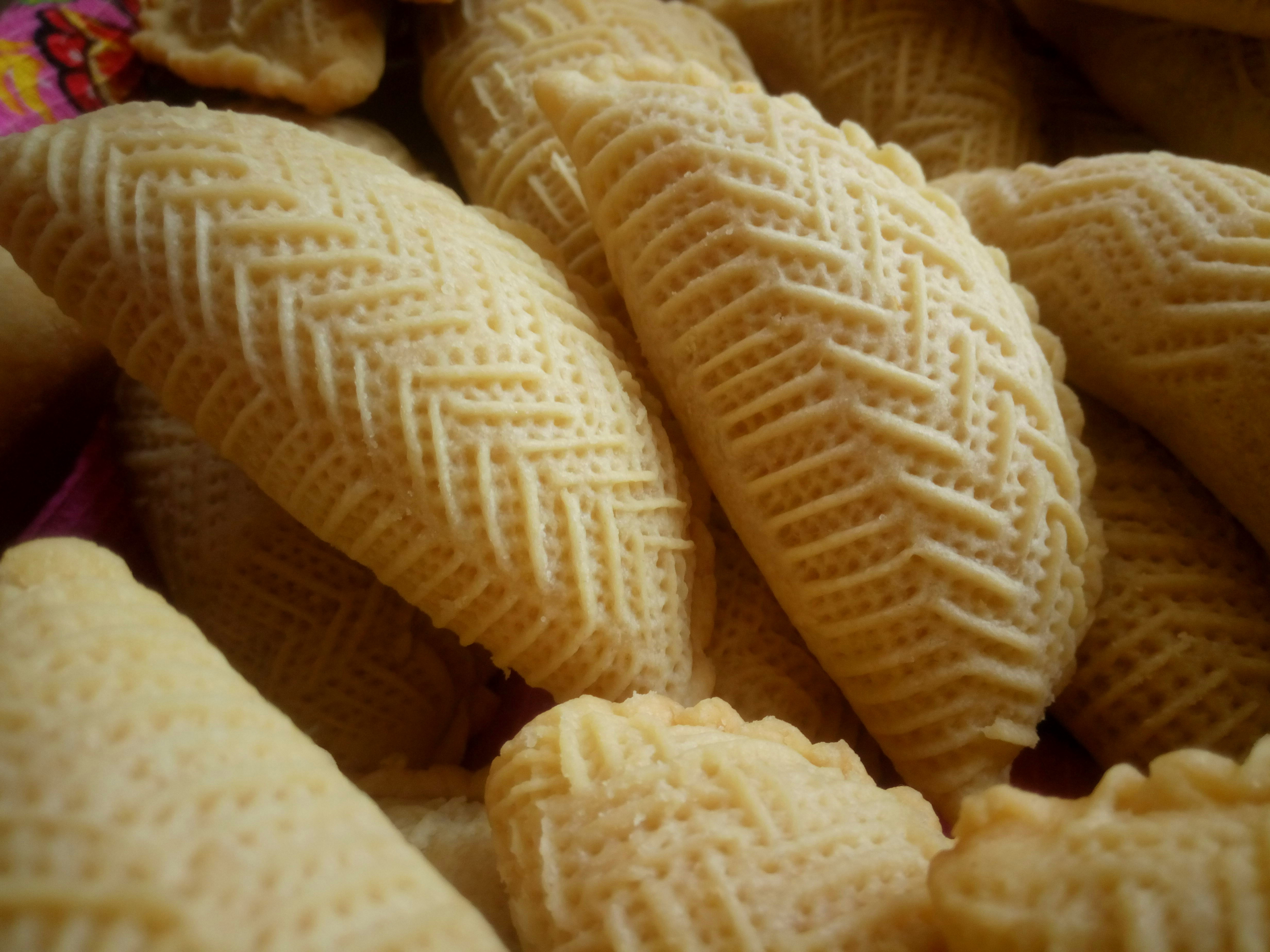
Shekerbura

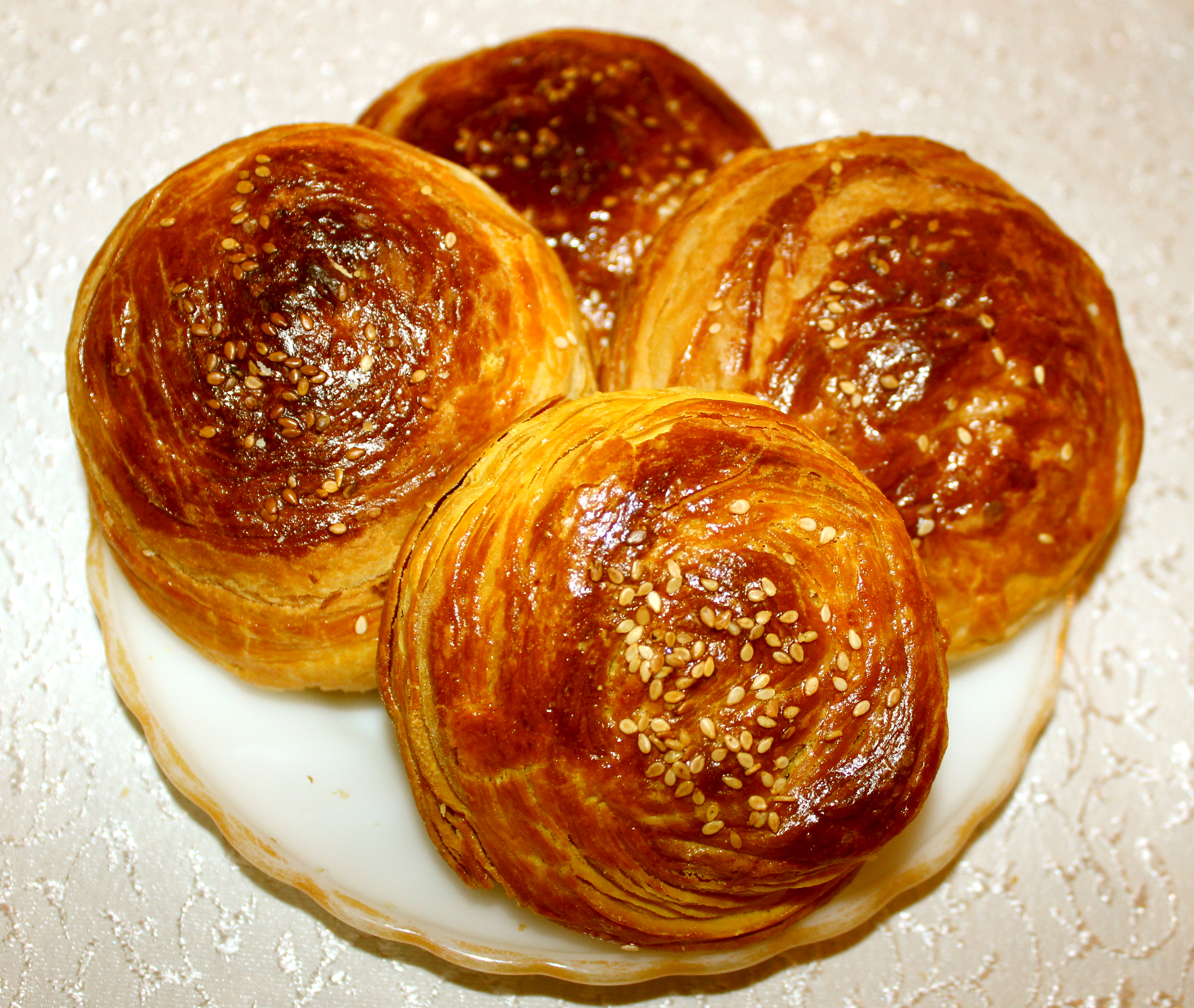
Shorgoghal

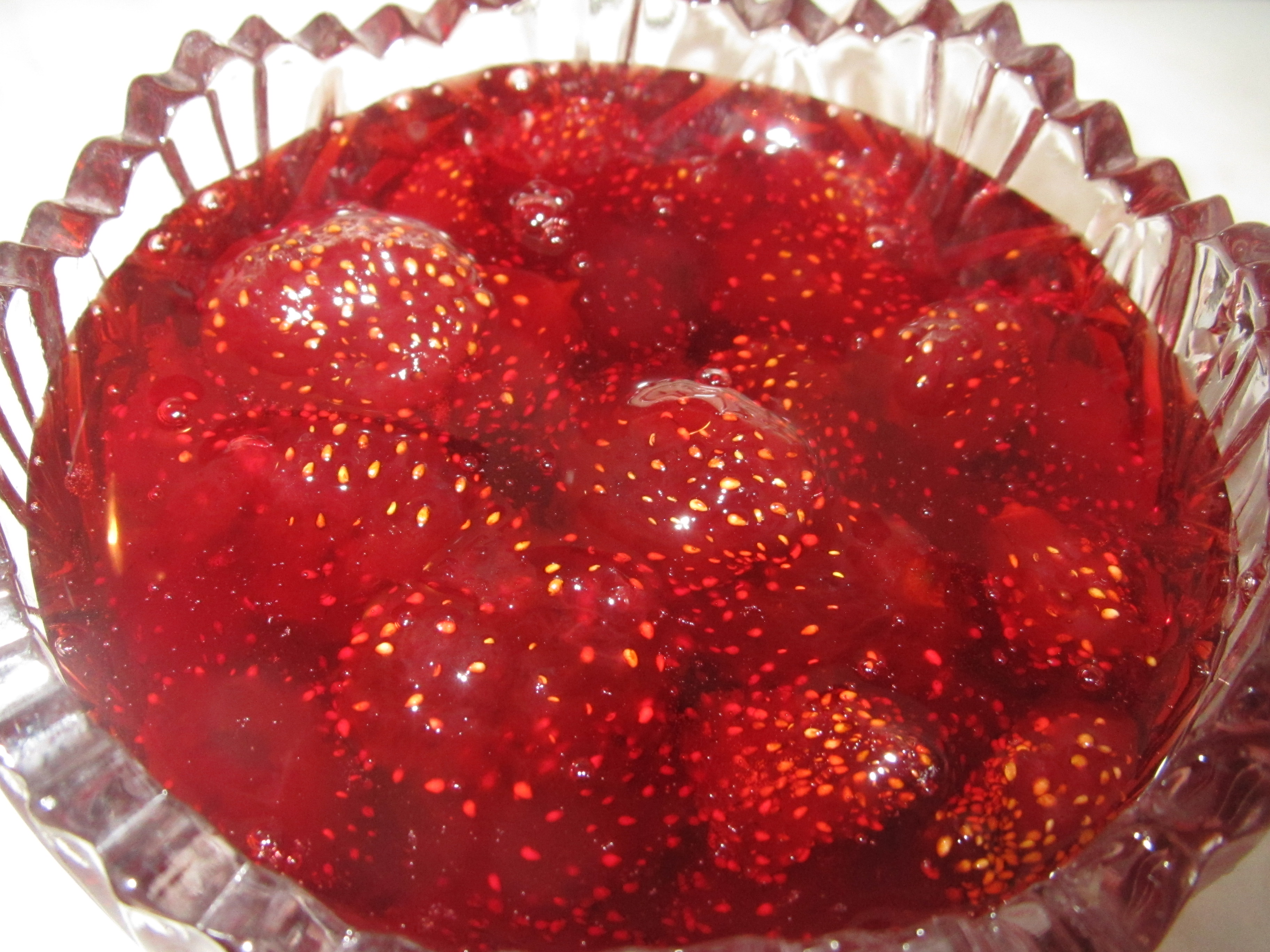
Strawberry murabba

Typical Azerbaijani desserts are sticky, syrup-saturated pastries such as pakhlava and shaki halva. The former, a layer of chopped nuts sandwiched between mats of thread-like fried dough, is a specialty of Shaki in northwest Azerbaijan. Other traditional pastries include shekerbura (crescent-shaped and filled with nuts), shorgoghal (round pastry filled with spices and salt) and badambura (decorated pastry filled with ground almonds, sugar, and cardamom).

Fruit preserves in Azerbaijan, as well as many other countries in the region, are called murabba and these are often served alongside tea, where they are eaten alongside tea, or placed directly into tea as a sweetener and flavoring.

Sweets are generally bought from a pastry shop and eaten at home or on special occasions such as weddings and wakes. The usual conclusion to a restaurant meal is a plate of fresh fruit that is in season, such as plums, cherries, apricots, or grapes.

In March 2009, Azerbaijani bakers achieved an entry in the CIS book of records for baking the biggest and heaviest pakhlava in the CIS, weighing about 3 tons. More than 7 thousand eggs, 350 kg of nuts, 20 kg of almonds, 350 kg of sugar, and the same amount of flour was used in the preparation of the pastry.

Name	Description
Pakhlava	Azerbaijani baklava consists of pastry, cardamom, and saffron are used for the preparation. Nuts (mostly hazelnuts, almonds or walnuts) and sugar are used as the filling, and syrup is used as a sweetener. There are some regional variations, like Quba, Ganja, Tenbel and Sheki baklava.
Shekerbura	Shekerbura (şəkərbura) is a popular Azerbaijani sweet pastry, filled with ground almonds, hazelnuts, or walnuts. It is covered in a pattern.
Samani halva	Samani halva is made from malted wheat. One samani halva tradition in Azerbaijan is to make halva communally.
Shorgoghal	Shorgoghal is a flaky pastry filled with turmeric, anise, caraway, cinnamon and black pepper.
Badambura	Badambura is a pastry filled with plain sugar, almonds (badam in Azerbaijani language), cardamom, and vanilla.

== Dairy products ==
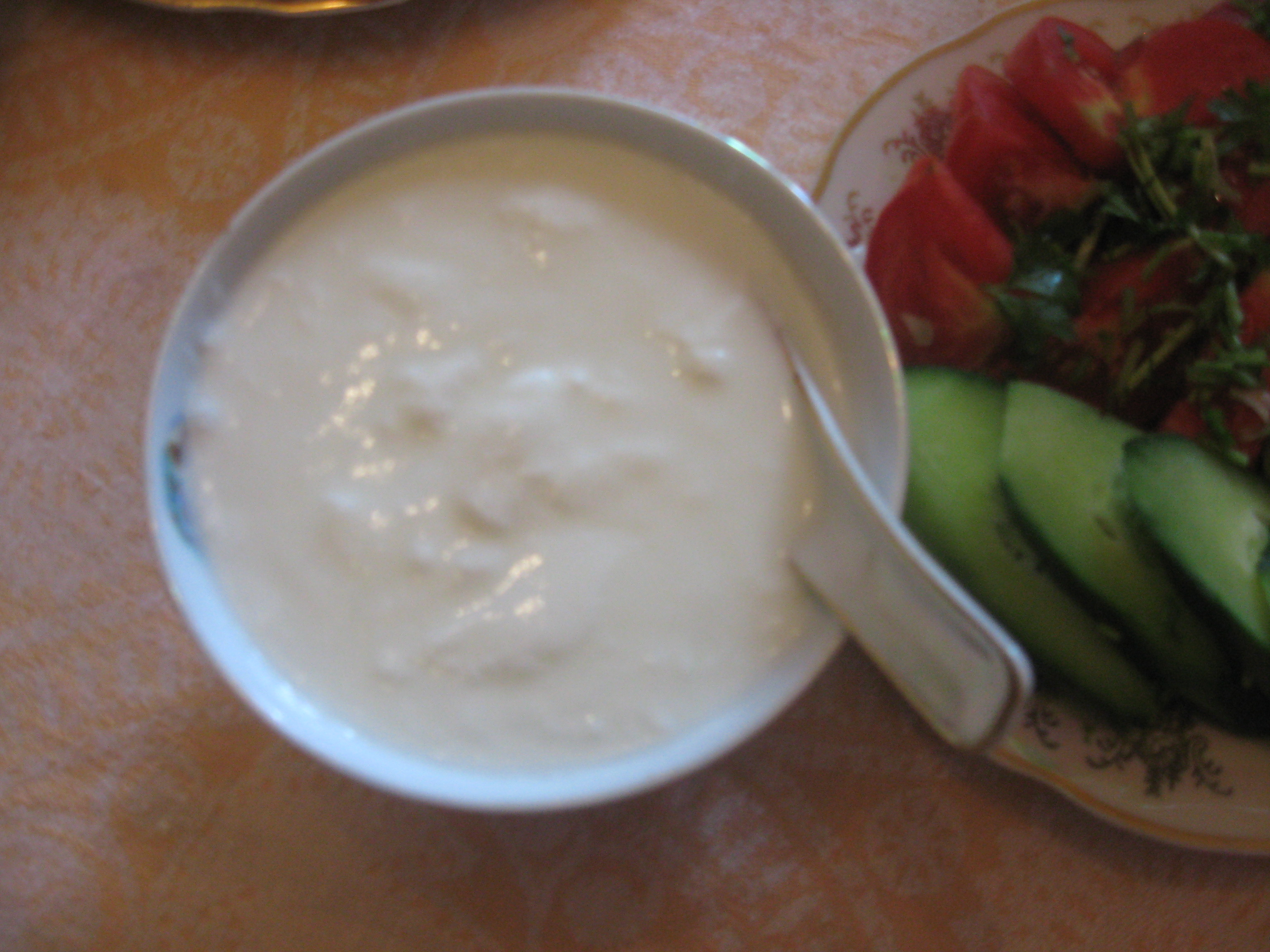
Qatiq

Milk and dairy products play an important role in the Azerbaijani diet. Milk, butter, cream, sour cream, yogurt, cottage cheese, buttermilk, dovga, ayran, qatiq, qurut, suzme and other dairy products are regularly consumed in the morning, as a snack, and incorporated into lunch and dinner. Cow's milk is most often used to produce local dairy products; however, sheep's milk is also sometimes used and goats' milk is consumed for its perceived health benefits. Rural communities in Azerbaijan produce local butter, buttermilk and cheeses using traditional churning techniques.

Name	Description
Ayran	A savory dairy drink. It is a staple of an Azerbaijani dinner/lunch table and is served cold.
Qatiq	A fermented, savory milk product. It is typically eaten with qutabs or with bread.
Qurut	It is made from grain mixed with sour milk or yogurt.
Dovga	A vegetarian, yoghurt-based soup cooked with a variety of herbs. Coriander, dill, mint and rice are mainstays of the soup.
Xinaliq pendiri	Cheese, produced in the village of Khinalug by the Khinalug people. It is one of the most popular cheeses in Azerbaijan.

== Breads ==
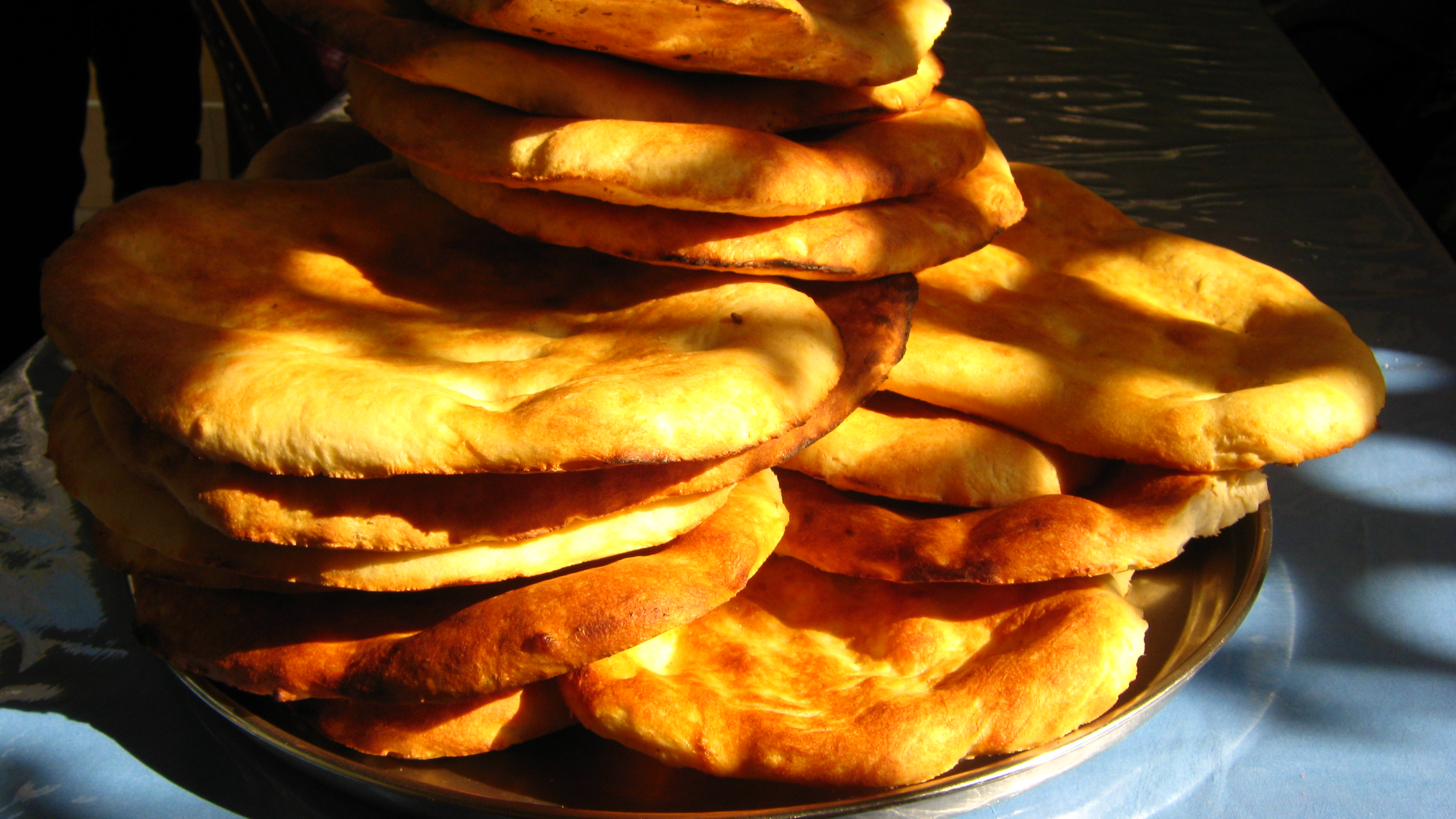
Salyan çörəyi (tandoor bread)

Different types of bread are baked in Azerbaijan: lavash and tandoor bread. In the Middle Ages, tandoor ovens were one of the common facilities of the population who lived in Old City (Icheri Sheher). This has been discovered during the archaeological excavations in different areas of Old City. During the meeting held in Ethiopia, the UNESCO Intergovernmental Committee for the Safeguarding of the Intangible Cultural Heritage decided to include lavash in the Representative List of the Intangible Cultural Heritage of the organization.

== Non-alcoholic beverages ==
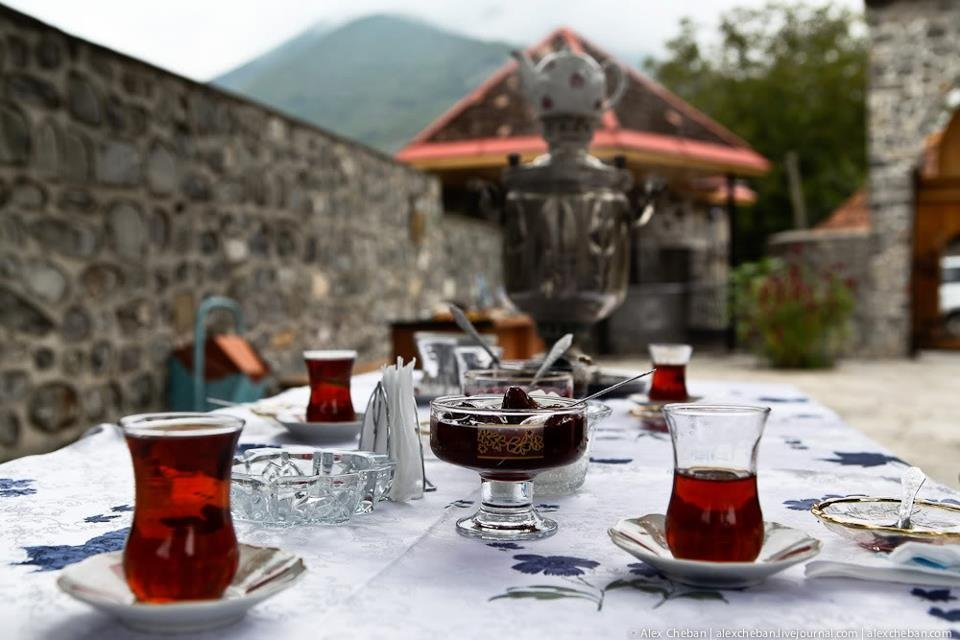
Black tea in armudu stekan (pear-shaped glasses)

Black tea is a popular drink in Azerbaijan. Azerbaijani people usually prefer tea made in a samovar. Jam (murabba) is often added to the tea as a sweetener.

Ayran is a cold yogurt beverage mixed with salt.

A sherbet (Azerbaijani: şərbət) is a sweet cold drink made of fruit juice mixed or boiled with sugar, often perfumed with rose water. Sherbets (not to be confused with sorbet ices) are of Iranian origin and they may differ greatly in consistency, from very thick and jam-like (as in Tajik cuisine) to very light and liquid, as in Azerbaijan. Sherbets are typically prepared with either lemon, pomegranate, strawberry, cherry, apricot, or mint.

Locally made brands of bottled water include:

Brand	Origin	Originating area
Qax	Qakh district	North
Kakh	Qakh district	North

== Alcoholic beverages ==
Unlike multiple other countries with a predominantly Muslim population, alcohol consumption in Azerbaijan is entirely legal, and a variety of alcoholic drinks, both locally produced and imported can be found in shops and bars across the country. Although alcohol consumption in Azerbaijan is relatively moderate, alcoholic drinks still play a part in nightlife, festivities and celebrations.

=== Wine ===
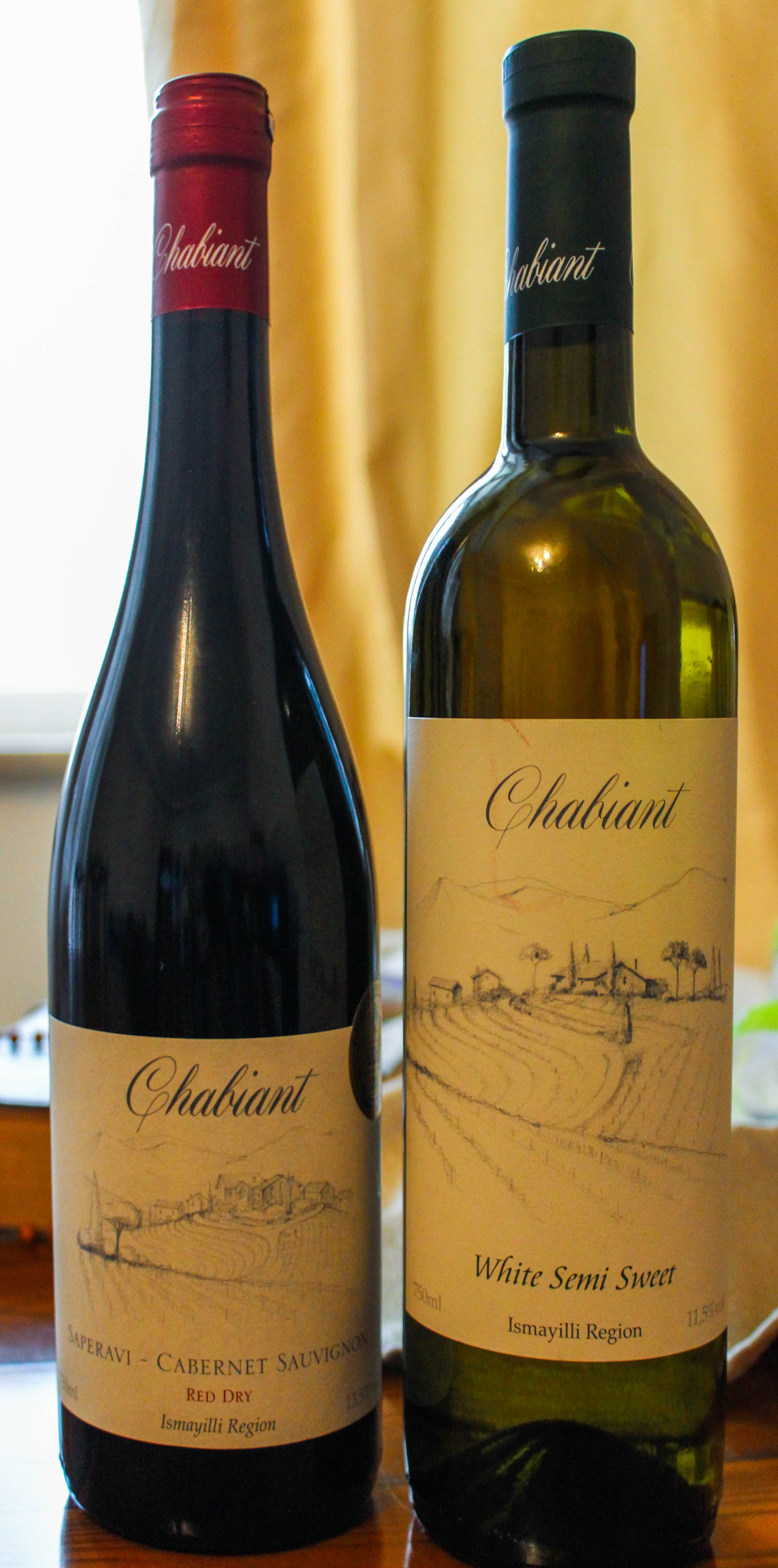
Chabiant Azerbaijani wine

Azerbaijan produces wine locally. In the Khanlar district of the Azerbaijan Republic, for example, archeologists have found jars buried with the remains of wine dating back to the 2nd millennium BC. One of the most ancient and notable regions known for its wine-making produce is Tovuz in northwestern Azerbaijan. Archeological findings in this region speak of ancient vessels for wine storage, stones and remains of tartaric acid used for wine-growing.

The contemporary wine-making in Azerbaijan is seen in Ganja-Qazakh and Shirvan economic zones. Vineyards in these regions account to about 7% of the country's cultivated land. The regions are famous for 17 vines and 16 table grape varieties, the most common of the wine cultivars being Pinot Noir. In Azerbaijan, wine is called sharab (Azerbaijani: şərab). Azerbaijan’s wine industry, which mostly evolved from German immigrants to the Caucasus, once in a good state, was nearly destroyed in the late Soviet and early post-Soviet period due to Mikhail Gorbachev’s anti-alcohol campaign, regional conflict, and economic collapse, which wiped out most vineyards and infrastructure. Since 2001, the government has used oil revenues to restore vineyards and modernize production, leading to steady recovery in output.

=== Beer ===
Beer in Azerbaijan is typified by lighter lagers. Of the domestically produced beers, the most widely distributed is Xirdalan named after the city of Xırdalan in Azerbaijan, formerly brewed by Baki-Castel (BGI) but bought by Baltika in 2008. In February 2017 company was renamed to Carlsberg Azerbaijan. As a sponsor of Baku's Eurovision Song Contest, Xirdalan issued special commemorative Eurovision cans and bottles in 2012. Other widespread, locally produced brands include Novxanı, NZS, Afsana and Annenfeld. Beer popularity continues to grow in Azerbaijan as of 2018 and there are plans to fully localize malt processing for beer production, with a new malt processing plant being planned to be launched in 2024. Unlike almost all CIS countries, the beer bottles in Azerbaijan are marked with excise duty sticker.

== See also ==
- Culture of Azerbaijan
- History of Azerbaijan
- Agriculture in Azerbaijan
- Dishes from the Caucasus
