= Isgelen tarag =

Mongolian yogurt drink

- Type: Fermented Yogurt (literal translation); actually kefir
- Origin: Mongolia
- Colour: Clear-white
- Ingredients: Milk from cattle and yaks, less often from goats and sheep
- Variants: Airag, kefir

Isgelen tarag (Mongolian: исгэлэн тараг, ᠢᠰᠬᠦᠯᠡᠩ ᠲᠠᠷᠠᠭ, or kefir) is a yogurt drink made by the Mongolian people, most commonly by nomadic families. It often uses the milk of a mare, sheep, cows, the yak, camels (specifically, khormog), or of reindeer, depending on local traditions or availability. It holds special status in Mongolia, Buryatia, and Inner Mongolia, both as the prime spirit of choice among pastoral units and served to esteemed guests.

The difference between airag or Kumis and isgelen tarag is mostly in the milk used (mare's milk vs. cattle milk). However, the two products are consumed in a very similar manner. Isgelen tarag is a refreshing beverage containing about 2% alcohol. Very often though it gets distilled to Arkhi (milk liquor).

== Preparation ==
The Mongolians use milk from cattle and yaks, less often from goats and sheep, to make isgelen tarag. The process is accomplished by a symbiotic culture of Lactobacillus bacteria and yeast. As with yogurt, the milk is boiled first. Most often, only the low fat milk remaining after the preparation of urum (Mongolian clotted cream) is used. The culture stored from the last run is added when the milk has cooled down to hand temperature. From this point on, the procedure is very similar to that of making Kumis. Isgelen tarag is placed in a vat and stirred regularly with a wooden masher (Buluur). The yeast will use the added oxygen to process the lactose to carbon dioxide and alcohol within about one day.

== See also ==
- Arkhi
- Ayran
