= Iron Winter =

Iron Winter may refer to:

- Iron Winter (film), a 2025 Australian feature documentary film directed by Kasimir Burgess.
- Iron Winter (novel), a 2012 novel by Stephen Baxter
