= Horse culture =

Tribal culture which revolves around horses

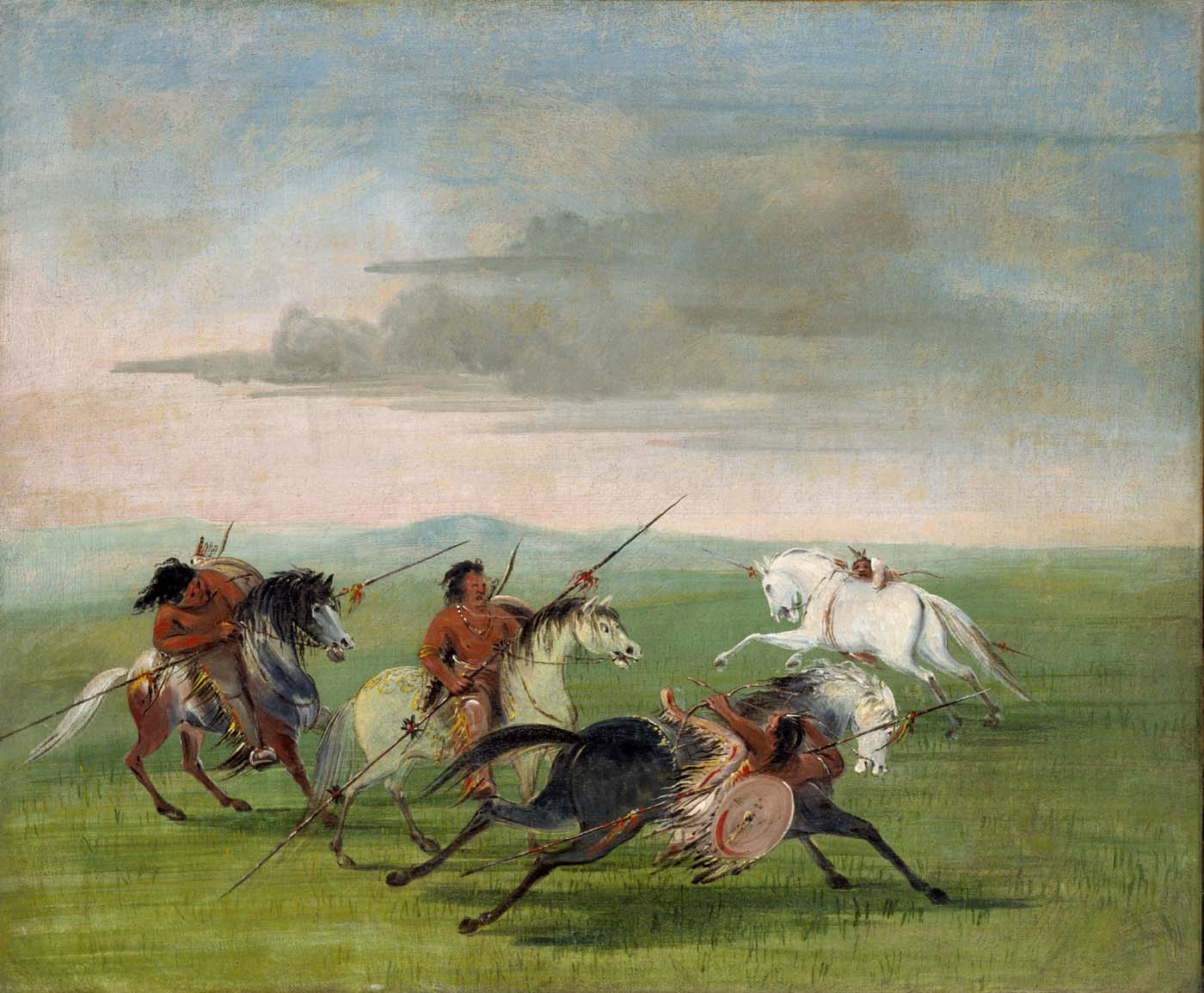
The Comanche were known for their horsemanship (painting by George Catlin, c. 1834)

A horse culture is a tribal group or community whose day-to-day life revolves around the herding and breeding of horses. Beginning with the domestication of the horse on the steppes of Eurasia, the horse transformed each society that adopted its use. Notable examples are the Mongols of Mongolia, the Scythian and Turkic nomads of Central Asia, the Plains Indians, the Chichimecas of the Gran Chichimeca, the Guaycuru peoples of the Gran Chaco, and the Mapuche and Tehuelche of Patagonia after horses were imported from Europe, particularly from Spain, during the 16th century. A common form of leisure in these horse cultures was horse racing and placing bets on these races.

== History ==
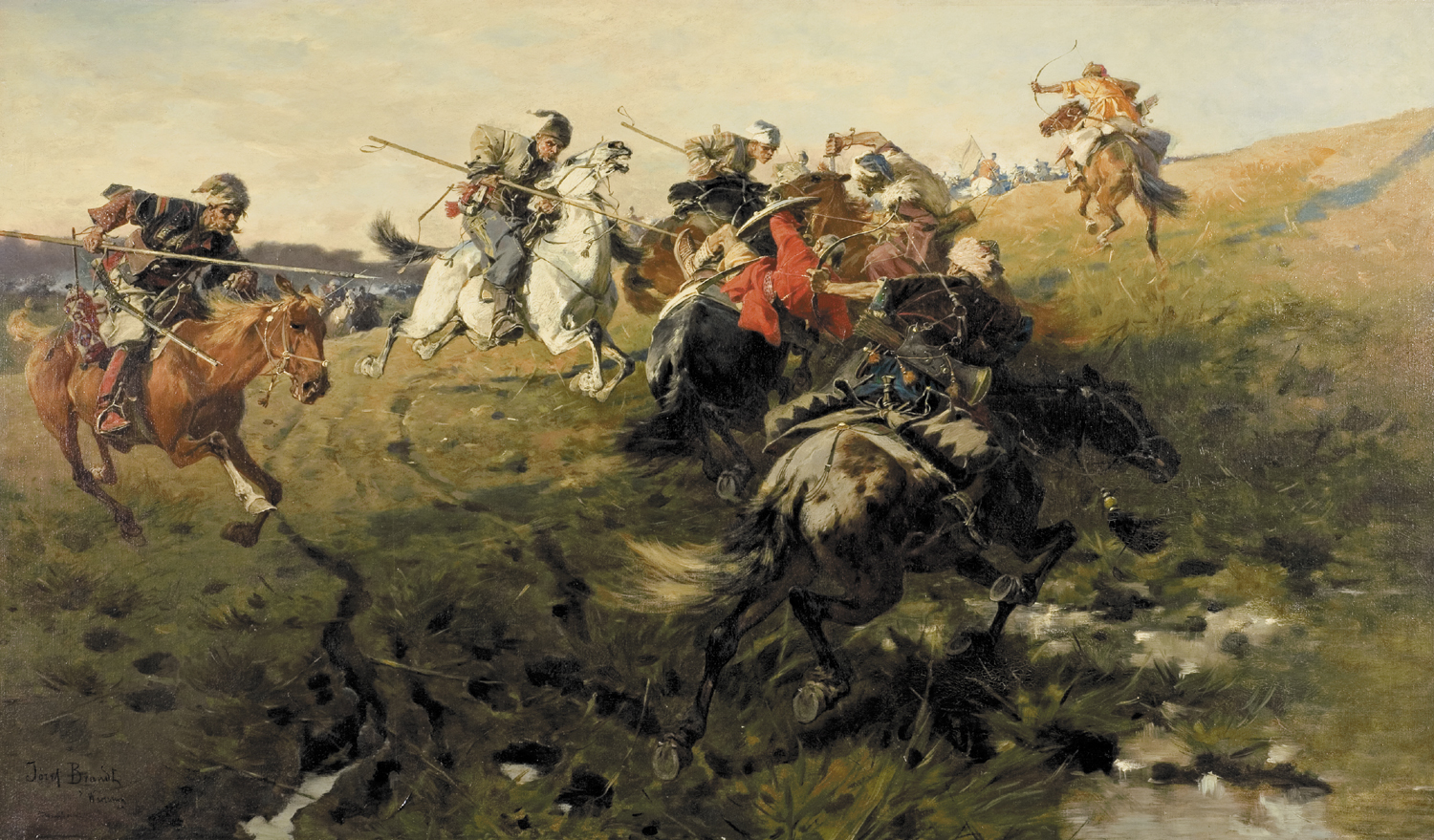
Tatars of the Crimean Khanate fighting the Cossacks

History offers many examples of horse cultures, such as the Huns and other peoples in Europe and Asia. Horse cultures tend to place a great deal of importance on horses and by their very nature are nomadic and usually hunter-gatherer or nomadic pastoralist societies. For example, the arrival of the horse in the Americas altered the cultures of the Native Americans in the Great Plains, the Gran Chaco and Patagonia. The horse increased mobility; the ability of the horse to cover a lot of ground in a very short period of time allowed native people to easily move from place to place, bringing on a nomadic shift in their culture, with an impact on transportation, trade, hunting and warfare.

However, there were also disadvantages to adopting horse culture, such as the increased responsibility of caring for the horses and keeping them healthy. Social structures of the community also had to shift to accommodate the physical space for horses to graze and feed easily.

== Horse racing ==
A common form of entertainment in many Native American horse cultures was horse racing. A typical race would have anywhere between two and six young men on horseback raced for about three to six kilometers. Much like with modern horse racing, gambling was often involved, and viewers of the race would place bets on which horse-rider pair they thought would win. These bets often included robes, blankets, and sometimes guns. Horse racing also appears in the mythology and folklore of some horse cultures such as that of the Navajo and Apache tribes that had stories showing that even their gods participating in horse races.

The act of horse racing is still relevant in modern times to indigenous peoples as can be seen with the Muckleshoot tribe's desire to buy the Playfair tracks for the sake of hosting horse races.

== Horse breeding ==
Horse cultures revolve around the keeping and breeding of horses. Most tribes varied slightly in how they went about breeding their horses and even within tribes, men would have different preferences for breeding. In American Indigenous nations like the Blackfoot, it was common practice to castrate any males that were not intended to be studs, but after that they left it up to their stallion to pick which mare it would mate with. Stallions would be picked to be studs based on their size, color, and speed.

== See also ==
- Horse culture in Mongolia
- Horse worship
- Livestock
- Nomadic empire
- Andronovo culture
