= Arkhi =

Distilled Mongolian kefir spirit

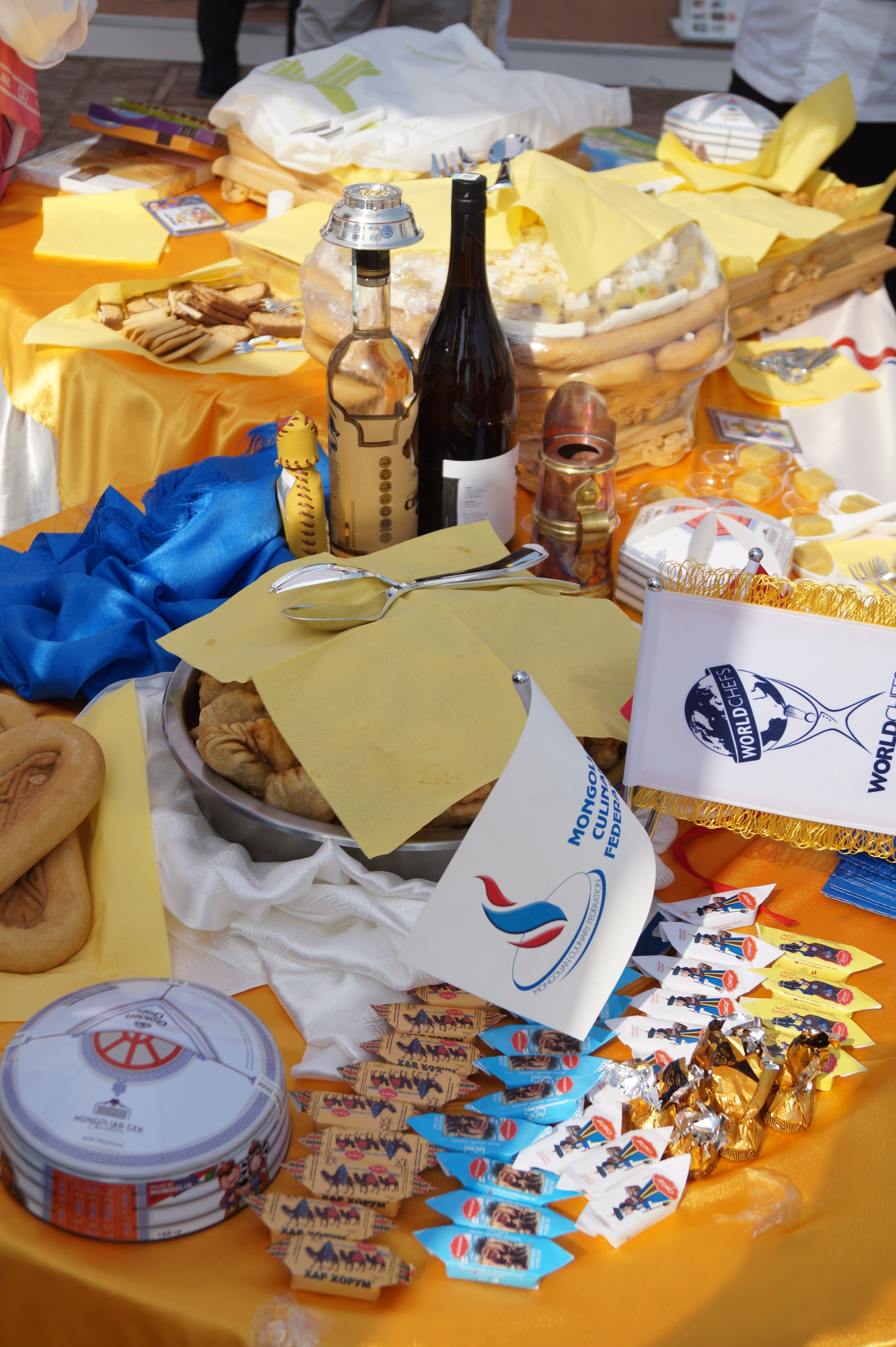
- Type: Milk brandy, distilled from kefir
- Origin: Mongolia
- Alcohol by volume: Up 10%, depending on distillation cycle
- Colour: Clear-white
- Ingredients: Fermented milk
- Variants: Airag, kefir

Arkhi (Mongolian: Архи, ᠠᠷᠢᠬᠢ, lit. "alcohol," sometimes translated as vodka) is a liquor made from airag, fermented milk brandy, or isgelen tarag (Mongolian: исгэлэн тараг, ᠢᠰᠬᠦᠯᠡᠩ
ᠲᠠᠷᠠᠭ, or kefir) which then gets distilled. Isgelen tarag often uses the milk of a mare, donkeys, sheep, cows, the yak, camels (specifically, khoormog (ингэний хоормог)) or of reindeer, depending on local traditions or availability. The Mongols adopted the distillation technology from Arab and Islamic producers of arak, a grape-based spirit, substituting their own local fermented ingredients to distill sometime in the 13th century. Their transmission of this technology to Korea led to the production of Soju there.

It holds special status in Mongolia and Inner Mongolia, both as the prime spirit of choice among pastoral units and served to esteemed guests.

It is often reserved for the family and never sold in Mongolia, slowly being replaced by vodka, also referred to as arkhi.

In and around Inner Mongolia, it is more regularly produced and sold. Industrial production and bottling occurs in locations such as Chifeng.

== See also ==
- Tarasun
