= Sweat scraper =

Animal grooming tool

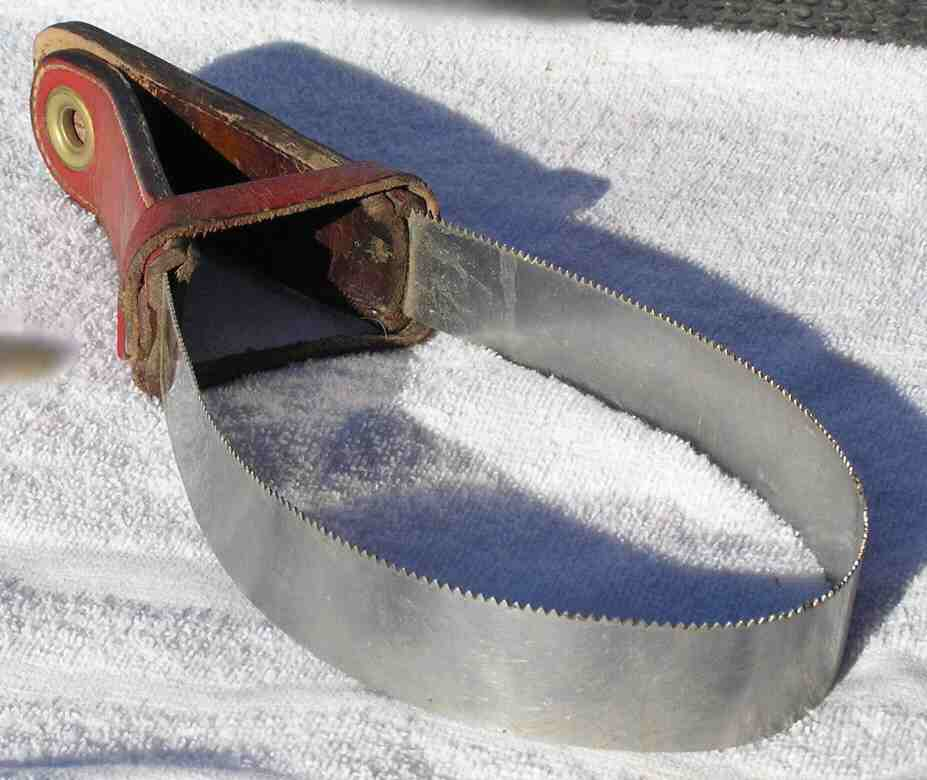
A shedding blade has dull metal teeth that help remove the shedding winter hair coat of a horse or other short-haired animal. The shedding blade may be flipped over and the smooth side used as a sweat scraper in warm weather

A sweat scraper is a tool used in horse grooming and with other animals, such as dogs. It consists of a handle and a rubber blade. Sweat scrapers are available in both metal and plastic form, and also traditionally in wood (as seen in Mongolia). It is used to remove sweat and/or excess hair from larger pets. It is used in much the same manner as a window cleaner would scrape water or foam from a window with a rubber blade. The typical use of a sweat scraper is to remove excess water after washing a horse to help it cool down rather than for just sweat. Without the use of a sweat scraper, it would take more effort and additional rags to remove the same amount of excess water therefore the proper use of a sweat scraper helps to ensure an effective cool down process.
