= Tarasun =

Siberian alcoholic drink

Tarasun (also known as Arhi) is an alcoholic beverage drunk by the Mongol Buryats of Siberia. Apart from being the national drink of Buryatia, it is also used by the Buryats in their religious ceremonies. The Buryat and his tarasun have been compared to a Scotsman and his whisky.

== Constituents ==
Tarasun is a "highly alcoholic colourless liquid" prepared by distillation and fermentation of a mare's milk. It is described as a form of "milk whisky".

== Religious usage ==
Tarasun is considered to be the "Soma" of the Buryats. Offerings of tarasun are made in almost all Buryat festivals and ceremonies including marriages and childbirth. Libations of tarasun are offered during the traditional Mongol horse-sacrifice called Tailgan. Following the sacrifice, pieces of horse meat are thrown into the fire and the people assembled recite the following invocation to their deities while partaking tarasun

We pray that we may receive from you a blessing. From among fat cattle we have chosen out meat for you. We have made strong tarasun for you. Let our ulus (villages) be one verst longer. Create cattle in our enclosures; under our blankets create a son; send down rain from high heaven to us; cause much grass to grow; create so much grain that sickle cannot raise it, and so much grass that scythe cannot cut it. Let no wolves out unless wolves that are toothless; and no stones unless stones without sharp corners or edges. Hover above our foreheads. Hover behind our heads. Look on us without anger. Help those of us who forget what we know. Rouse those of us who are sleeping (in spirit). In a harsh year (a year of trouble) be Compassion. In a difficult year (a year of want) be Kindness (in sense of help). Black spirits lead farther away from us; bright spirits lead hither, nearer; gray spirits lead farther away from us. Burkans lead hither to us. Green grass give in the mouths (of cattle). Let me walk over the first snow. If I am timid, be my courage. If I am ashamed, be a proper face to me. Above be as a coverlid, below be as a felt bed to me.

Buryat shamans generally prefer tarasun to vodka for usage in religious ceremonies as they feel that tarasun is more pure as it is made with special distillation equipment which only the affluent own and hence, is not made in villages. Also, according to the Buryat religion, milk and the colour white were always associated with the pure. In recent times, however, this trend is getting reversed as tarasun is being gradually replaced by vodka. A Buryat Conference which met at Irkutsk on 15 April 1917, in the aftermath of the February Revolution, prohibited the production of tarasun for normal consumption making it a punishable offense while allowing concessions for the religious usage of tarasun.

== See also ==
- Arkhi
- Kumis

== Bibliography ==
- Curtin, Jeremiah (1909). A journey in Southern Siberia. Boston: Little, Brown and Company.
- Bisher, Jamie (2005). White Terror: Cossack warlords of the Trans-Siberian. Routledge. ISBN 0-7146-5690-9.

== See also ==
- Soma
