= Iron Winter (film) =

2025 Australian documentary film

Iron Winter is a 2025 Australian feature-length documentary film about Mongolian horse-herders, directed by Kasimir Burgess.

== Synopsis ==
Two young Mongolian horse-herders, two horse herders, Batbold, aged 18, and Tsagana, aged 22, herd around 2000 animals across the Tsaikhir Valley in the Mongolian Steppes in the depths of a bitterly cold winter, learning the traditional ways of their fathers while having one foot in the modern world. The practice is diminishing owing to climate change and young Mongolians moving to the cities for work. Batbold's father, Bayankhangai, had undertaken ten such gruelling trips.

== Production ==
Iron Winter is produced by Adelaide filmmakers Ben Golotta and Morgan Wright of Repeater Productions. In winter 2023, they travelled with and filmed two horse herders, Batbold, aged 18, and Tsagana, aged 22, herding around 2000 animals across the Tsaikhir Valley, Mongolia, in a traditional journey to take the horses to safer grazing. The practice is diminishing owing to climate change and young Mongolians moving to the cities for work. Batbold's father, Bayankhangai, had undertaken ten such gruelling trips before the making of this film.

Golotta had studied sound engineering and music in London and Copenhagen before joining Wright at Repeater Productions, which started off producing only sound, but over the course of nine years expanded into making short films and music videos.

To make Iron Winter, Golotta and Wright recruited their friend Kasimir Burgess, a director based in Melbourne, and cinematographer Benjamin Bryan. Bryan and senior producer Chris Kamen had both worked with Burgess on the 2022 feature documentary Franklin, the highest grossing documentary of that year. This led to obtaining funding from Screen Australia, VicScreen, and the Melbourne International Film Festival Premier Fund.

The team made a short film about the herders which screened at the International Documentary Conference in Melbourne, and won the Sheffield DocFest Prize.

The film was co-written by journalist Ed Cavanough and Enebish Sengemugaa, and co-edited by Burgess and Kenny Ang. Music was by Luke Altmann.

== Release ==
Iron Winter was premiered in competition at the Visions du Réel documentary film festival in Switzerland in April 2025.

It screened in the Melbourne International Film Festival in August 2025, and screens at the Adelaide Film Festival in October 2025.

== Reception ==
Nadine Whitney, writing for The Curb website, called the film "an immersive and intimate piece of cinema... Transcendentally lensed by Benjamin Bryan, Iron Winter is almost elegiac".
