= Tsakhir =

District in Arkhangai Province, Mongolia

Coordinates: 48°09′20″N 99°04′03″E

Tsakhir District Цахир сум ᠴᠠᠬᠢᠷᠰᠤᠮᠤ
- District
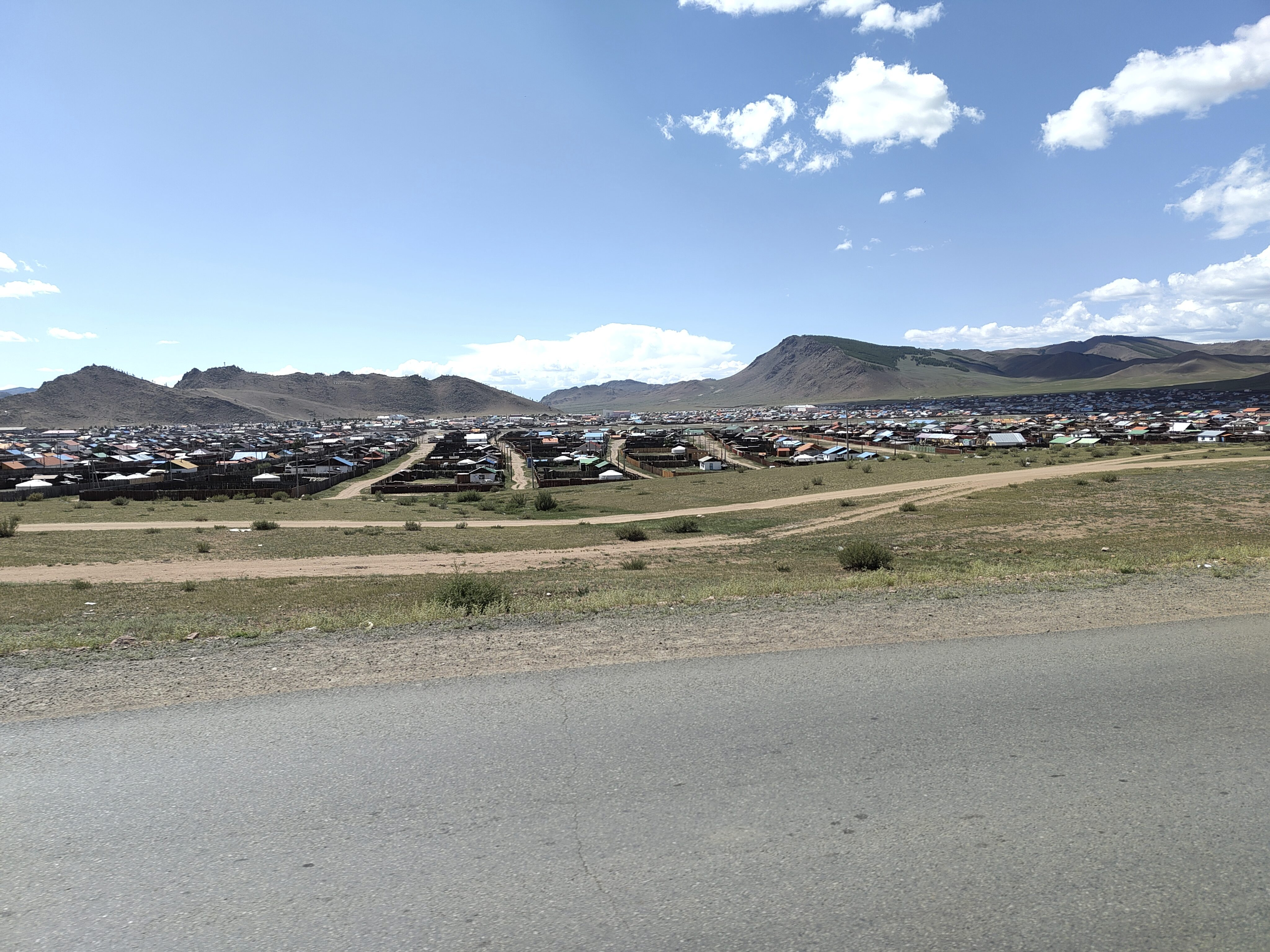

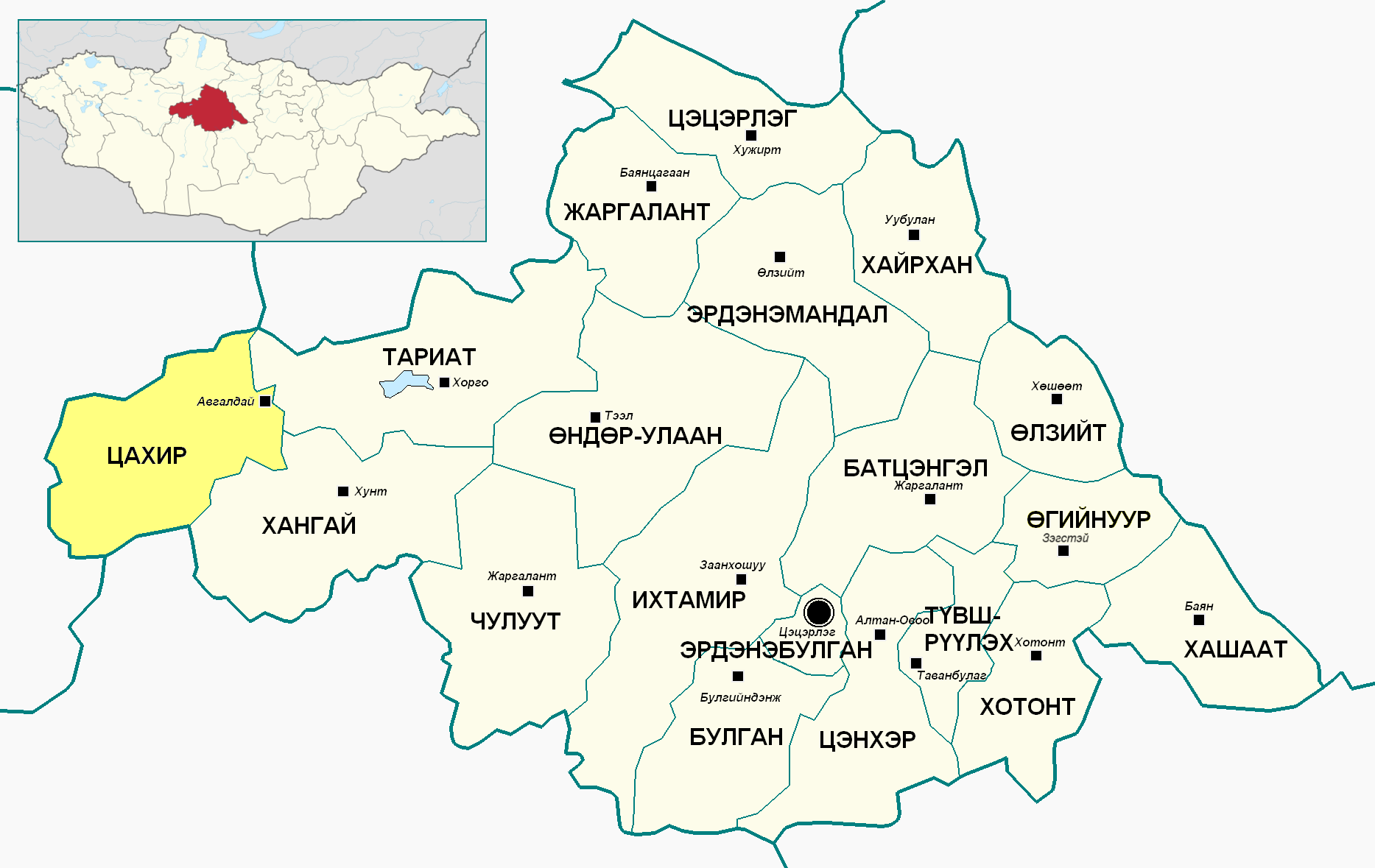
- Tsakhir District in Arkhangai Province
- Country: Mongolia
- Province: Arkhangai Province

Area
  - Total: 3,398 km^{2} (1,312 sq mi)
- Time zone: UTC+8 (UTC + 8)

Tsakhir (Mongolian: Цахир) is a sum (district) of Arkhangai Province in central Mongolia. In 2009, its population was 2,143.

Tsakhir sum is the westernmost sum in the aimag. On the east, it borders the sums Tariat to the north and the Khangai to the south. The western border is adjacent to Zavkhan Aimag. To the north is the Khövsgöl Aimag, and to the south the Bayankhongor Aimag.

== Administrative divisions ==
The district is divided into four bags, which are:

- Bayangol
- Jinst
- Khan-Uul
- Tsakhir

== Notable people ==
- Radnaasümbereliin Gonchigdorj (born 1953) - Mongolian Social Democratic Party politician.
