= Kumis =

Fermented dairy product made of mare milk

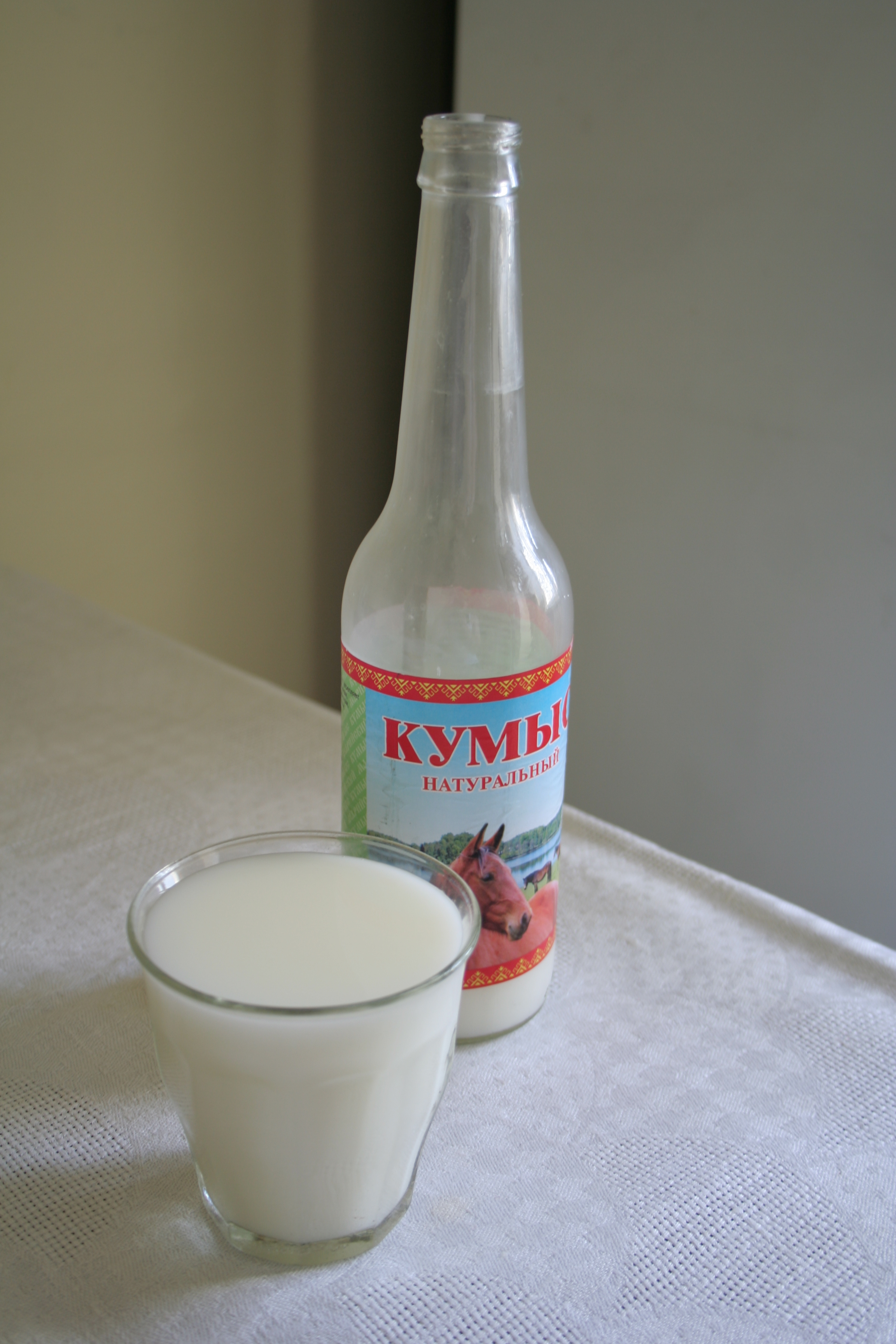
- A bottle and glass of kumis
- Type: Dairy product
- Main ingredients: Mare milk

Kumis (/ˈkuːmɪs/ KOO-mis, rarely /ˈkʌmɪs/ KUM-is), alternatively spelled coumis or kumyz, (Note: See other transliterations and cognate words below under the terminology and etymology section.) also known as airag (/ˈaɪræɡ/ EYE-rag), (Note: Old Turkic: airag; Oirat: әәрг äärg; Buryat and Khalkha Mongolian: айраг [ˈæe̯rə̆q]) is a traditional fermented dairy product made from mare milk. The drink is important to the peoples of the Central and East Asian steppes, of Turkic and Mongolic origin: Volga Tatars, Kazakhs, Bashkirs, Kalmyks, Kyrgyz, Siberian Tatars, Mongols, and Yakuts. Kumis was also historically consumed by the Magyars as well as the Khitans, Jurchens, and Han of northern China.

Kumis is a dairy product similar to kefir, but is produced from a liquid starter culture, in contrast to the solid kefir "grains". Because mare's milk contains more sugars than cow's or goat's milk, when fermented, kumis has a higher, though still mild, alcohol content compared to kefir.

Even in the areas of the world where kumis is popular today, mare's milk remains a very limited commodity. Industrial-scale production, therefore, generally uses cow's milk, which is richer in fat and protein, but lower in lactose than the milk from a horse. Before fermentation, the cow's milk is fortified in one of several ways. Sucrose may be added to allow comparable fermentation. Another technique adds modified whey to better approximate the composition of mare's milk.

== Terminology and etymology ==
Kumis comes from the Turkic word kimiz. (Note: Azerbaijani: قیمیز гымыз, romanized: qımız, IPA: [gɯˈmɯz]; Turkmen: gymyz [ɢɯˈmɯð]; Turkish: kımız [kʰɯˈmɯs]; Kazakh: қымыз, romanized: qymyz, IPA: [qəmə́z]; Tatar: кымыз, romanized: qımız, IPA: [qɤˈmɤz]; Kyrgyz: кымыз, romanized: qımız, IPA: [qʰɯmɯ́s]; Bashkir: ҡымыҙ, romanized: qımıź, IPA: [qɯ̞ˈmɯ̞ð]; Yakut: кымыс, romanized: kımıs, IPA: [qɯˈmɯs]; Tuvan: хымыс, romanized: xımıs, IPA: [χɤmɤ́s]; Uzbek: қимиз, romanized: qimiz, IPA: [qɨˈmɨz]; Russian: кумыс, romanized: kumys, IPA: [kʊˈmɨs]; Chinese: 马奶酒, IPA: [mànǎɪtɕjòʊ]) Gerard Clauson notes that kımız is found throughout the Turkic language family and cites the 11th-century appearance of the word in Dīwān Lughāt al-Turk written by Mahmud al-Kashgari in the Karakhanid language.

In Mongolia, the drink is called airag (айраг) or, in some areas, tsegee. William of Rubruck, in his 13th-century travels, calls the drink cosmos and describes its preparation among the Mongols.

== Production ==
=== Milking ===
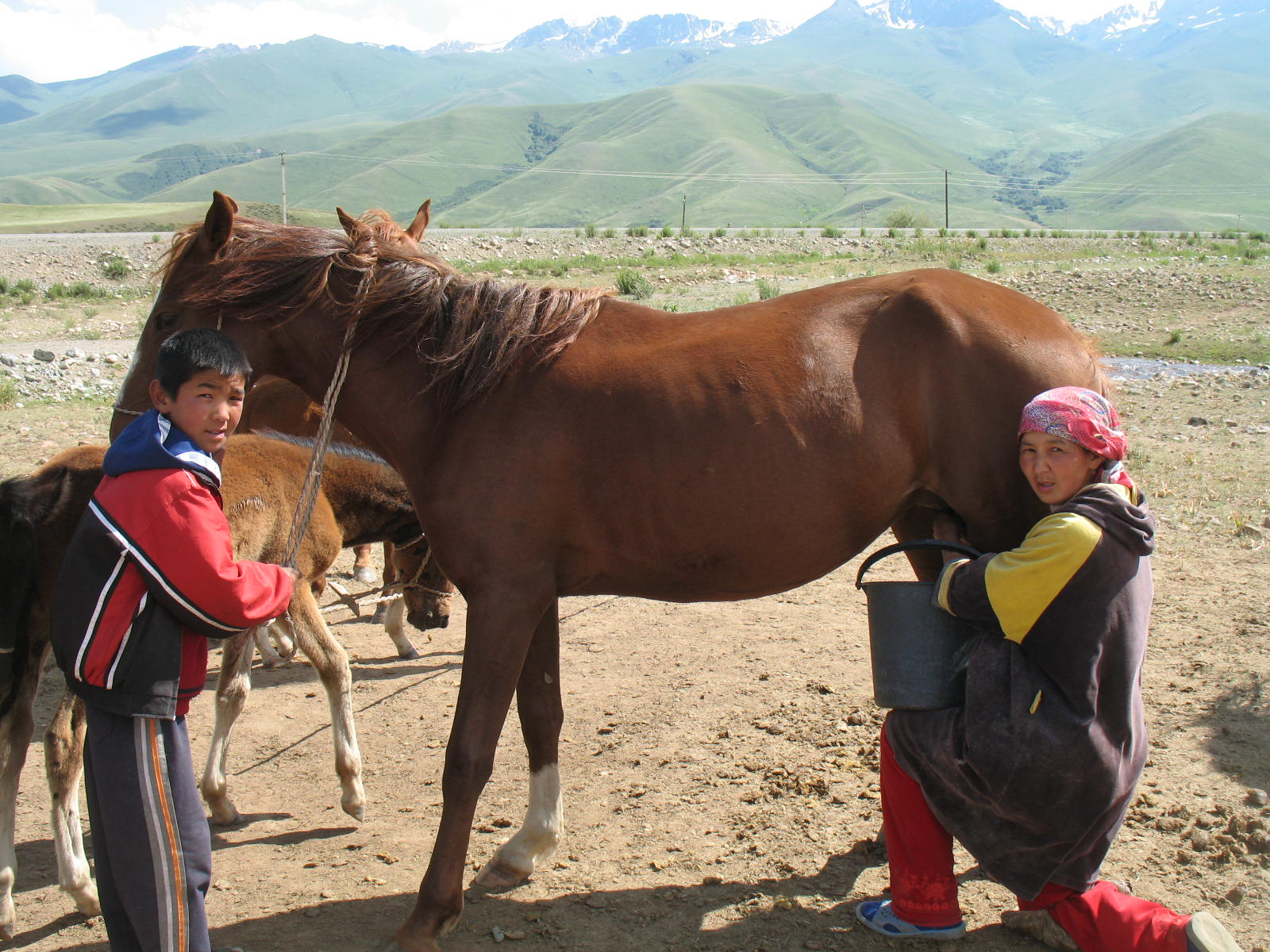
A mare being milked in the Suusamyr Valley, Kyrgyzstan

Rinchingiin Indra, writing about Mongolian dairying, says "it takes considerable skill to milk a mare" and describes the technique: the milker kneels on one knee, with a pail propped on the other, steadied by a string tied to an arm. One arm is wrapped behind the mare's rear leg and the other in front. A foal starts the milk flow and is pulled away by another person, but left touching the mare's side during the entire process.

In Mongolia, the milking season for horses traditionally runs between mid-June and early October. During one season, a mare produces approximately 1,000 to 1,200 litres of milk, of which about half is left to her foal.

=== Fermentation ===
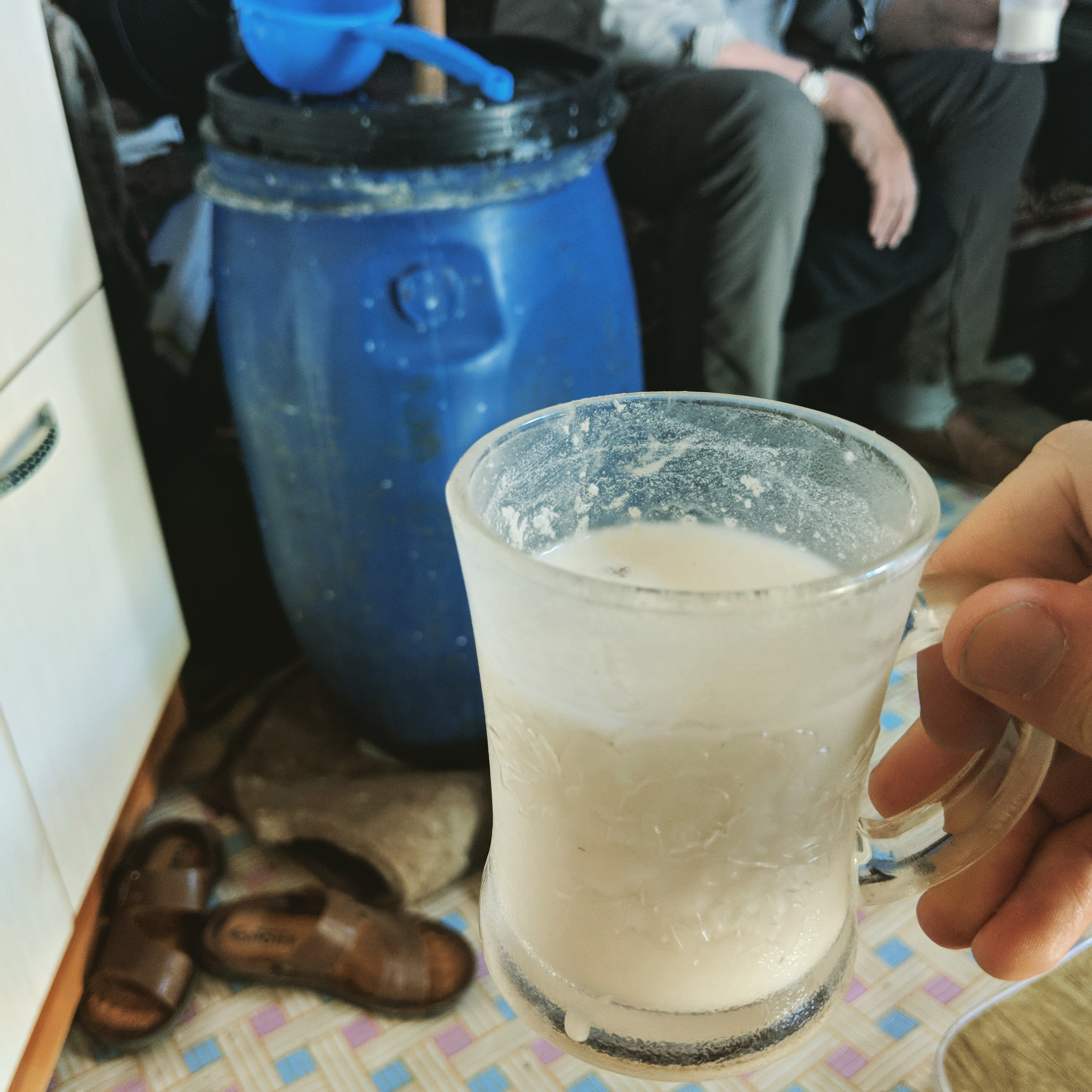
A glass of homemade Mongolian airag, prepared in the blue plastic barrel in the background

Kumis is made by fermenting raw milk (that is, unpasteurized) over the course of hours or days, often while stirring or churning. (The physical agitation has similarities to making butter.) During the fermentation, lactobacilli bacteria acidify the milk, and yeasts turn it into a carbonated and mildly alcoholic drink.

Traditionally, this fermentation took place in horse-hide containers, which might be left on the top of a yurt and turned over on occasion, or strapped to a saddle and joggled around over the course of a day's riding. Today, a wooden vat or plastic barrel may be used in place of the leather container. In modern, controlled production, the initial fermentation takes two to five hours, at a temperature of around 27 °C (81 °F); this may be followed by a cooler aging period.

Kumis itself has a very low level of alcohol, between 0.7 and 2.5%. Kumis can, however, be strengthened through freeze distillation, a technique Central Asian nomads are reported to have employed. It can also be made into the distilled beverage known as arkhi.

== History ==
Kumyss, in the intestinal disorders of infants and young children

Archaeological investigations of the Botai culture of ancient Kazakhstan have revealed traces of milk in bowls from the site of Botai, suggesting the domestication of dairy animals. No specific evidence for its fermentation has yet been found, but considering the location of the Botai culture and the nutritional properties of mare's milk, the possibility is high.

Kumis is an ancient beverage. Herodotus, in his 5th-century BC Histories, describes the Scythians processing of mare's milk:

Now the Scythians blind all their slaves, to use them in preparing their milk. The plan they follow is to thrust tubes made of bone, not unlike our musical pipes, up the vulva of the mare, and then to blow into the tubes with their mouths, some milking while the others blow. They say that they do this because when the veins of the animal are full of air, the udder is forced down. The milk thus obtained is poured into deep wooden casks, about which the blind slaves are placed, and then the milk is stirred round. That which rises to the top is drawn off, and considered the best part; the under portion is of less account.

This is widely believed to be the first description of ancient kumis-making. Apart from the idiosyncratic method of mare-milking, it matches up well enough with later accounts, such as this one given by 13th-century traveller William of Rubruck:

This cosmos, which is mare's milk, is made in this wise. [...] When they have got together a great quantity of milk, which is as sweet as cow's as long as it is fresh, they pour it into a big skin or bottle, and they set to churning it with a stick [...] and when they have beaten it sharply it begins to boil up like new wine and to sour or ferment, and they continue to churn it until they have extracted the butter. Then they taste it, and when it is mildly pungent, they drink it. It is pungent on the tongue like rapé wine when drunk, and when a man has finished drinking, it leaves a taste of milk of almonds on the tongue, and it makes the inner man most joyful and also intoxicates weak heads, and greatly provokes urine.

Rubruk also mentions that the Mongols prized a variety of kumis he calls caracomos ("black comos"), which was reserved for "great lords".

In the 19th century, "kumyss" was used to treat gastrointestinal disorders.

A 1982 source reported 230,000 mares were kept in the Soviet Union specifically for producing milk to make into kumis.

== Consumption ==
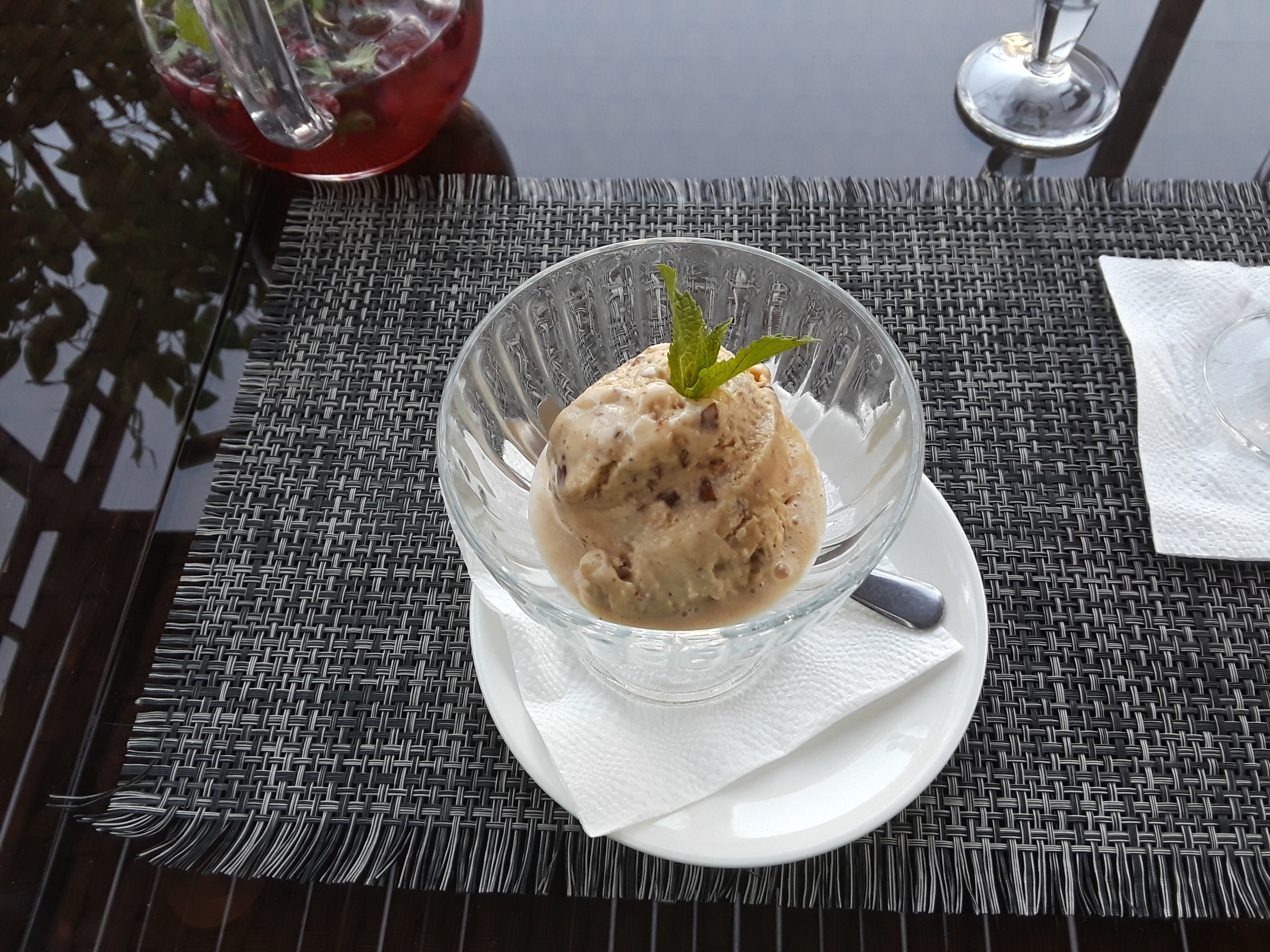
Kumis-flavored ice cream at a restaurant in Astana, Kazakhstan

Strictly speaking, kumis is in its own category of alcoholic drinks, because it is made neither from fruit nor from grain. Technically, it is closer to wine than to beer, because the fermentation occurs directly from sugars (wine is usually fermented directly from fruit, whereas beer relies on starches, usually from grain, which convert to sugars by mashing). In terms of experience and traditional manner of consumption, however, it is much more comparable to beer and is even milder in alcoholic content than beer. It is arguably the region's beer equivalent.

Kumis is very light in body compared to most dairy drinks. It has a unique, slightly sour flavor with a bite from the mild alcoholic content. The exact flavor is greatly variable between different producers.

Kumis is usually served cold or chilled. Traditionally it is sipped out of small, handle-less, bowl-shaped cups or saucers, called piyala. The serving of it is an essential part of Kyrgyz hospitality on the jayloo or high pasture, where they keep their herds of animals (horse, cattle, and sheep) during the summer phase of transhumance.

== Cultural role ==
During the Yuan dynasty of China, kumis was essentially made to be the replacement of tea. Furthermore, Möngke Khan, the fourth Great Khan of the Mongol Empire, had a drinking fountain made in his capital of Karakorum that included kumis alongside Chinese rice wine, mead, and Persian grape wine, as a symbol of the empire's diversity and size.

Bishkek, the capital of Kyrgyzstan, is supposedly named after the paddle used to churn the fermenting milk.

The famous Russian writer Leo Tolstoy in A Confession spoke of running away from his troubled life by drinking kumis.

The Russian composer Alexander Scriabin was recommended a kumis diet and "water cure" by his doctor in his twenties, for his nervous condition and right-hand injury.

The Japanese soft drink Calpis models its flavor after the taste of kumis.

== See also ==
- Ayran
- Blaand
- Buttermilk
- Cacık
- Calpis
- Chal
- Doogh
- Mattha
- Chaas
- Laban
- Lassi
- Suutei tsai
- Tarasun
- List of ancient dishes and foods
- List of dairy products
