= Cuisine of Devon =

Culinary traditions of Devon, England

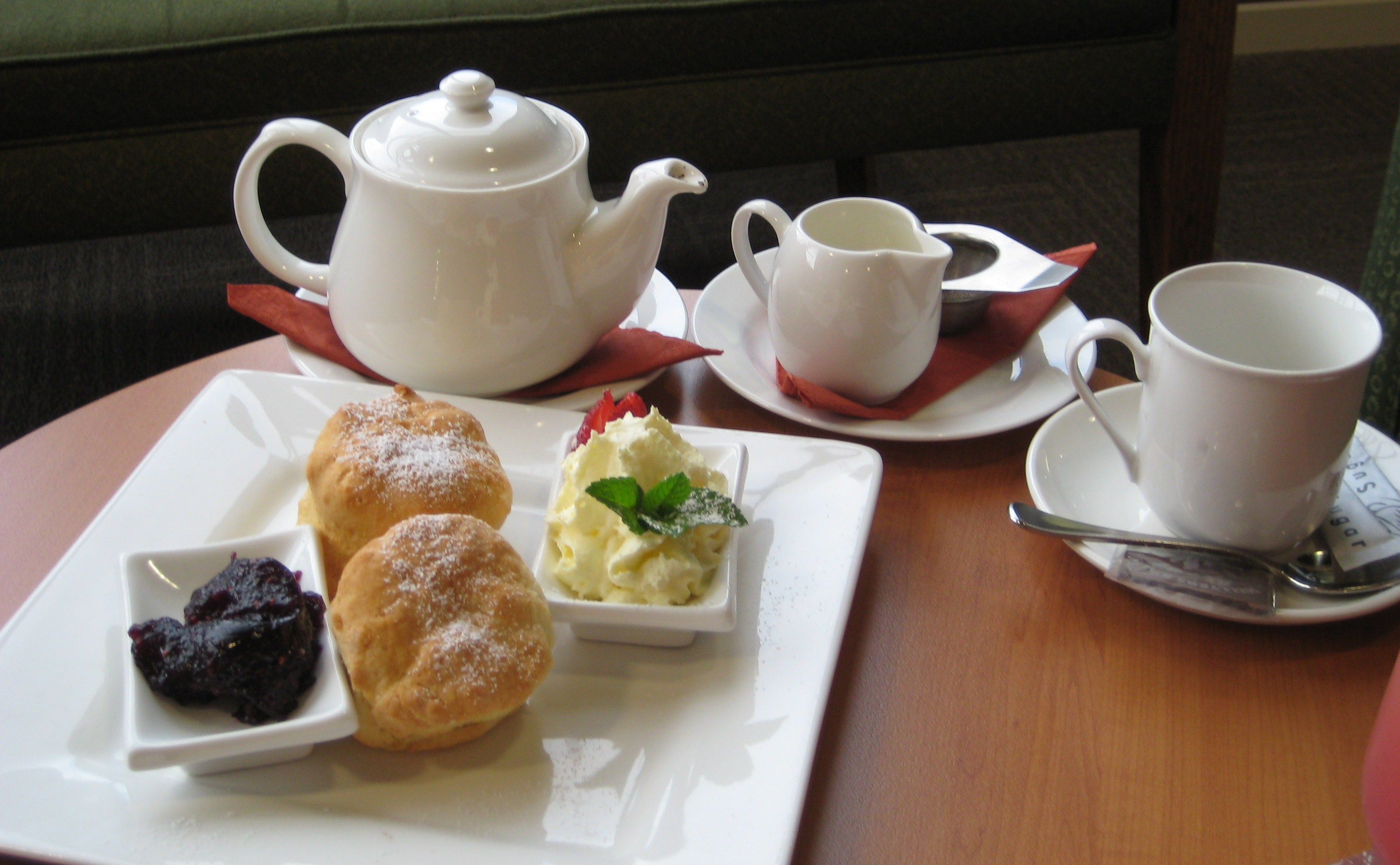
A Devon cream tea

The cuisine of Devon in England has influenced, and been influenced, by other British cuisine. Its tradition of dairy farming has resulted in several dishes, some of which have made both it and Cornwall famous, such as cream teas and junket. Because Devon is largely a rural county, it likewise has a strong reputation for excellent pasture-raised beef and lamb. Orchard fruits are also important, particularly apples, used both for cider as well as for apple-based desserts. The long coastline supplies the county with a wide variety of fish and seafood.

== Food ==
As a predominantly rural county with a temperate climate, frequent rains and fertile soils, Devon has for centuries been a net exporter of high quality dairy produce, fresh fruit and vegetables, meat and fish, particularly after the nineteenth-century expansion of the railway network which enabled the fast transport of fresh goods to large cities. This tradition continues, and many food products, such as premium fish and crab landed in Brixham remain highly regarded, particularly in London.

As of 2012, Devon boasts a Michelin Guide two-starred restaurant at Gidleigh Park and three other one-starred establishments. Several high-profile restaurant owners have relocated to Devon, to take advantage of its high quality produce, including Damien Hirst, Hugh Fearnley-Whittingstall and Mark Hix with a particular cluster in East Devon around Axminster, Ilfracombe and nearby Lyme Regis on the Dorset border. Another gastronomic cluster in the South Hams centred on Totnes, Dartmouth and Modbury, results from these communities pioneering of the Transition Towns concept to develop a sustainable relationship between producer and consumer in the rural economy, while the historic towns of Tavistock, Okehampton and Widecombe-in-the-Moor remain well known for their ancient seasonal markets.

In October 2008, Devon was awarded Fairtrade County status by the Fairtrade Foundation. A monthly county magazine, Devon Life, regularly publishes articles on the food and drink of the county, and the Cornish & Devon Post, a newspaper published in Launceston, also publishes Cornish & Devon Farming Diary and a yearly eating and entertainment guide, Country Cuisine.

=== Meat and fish ===
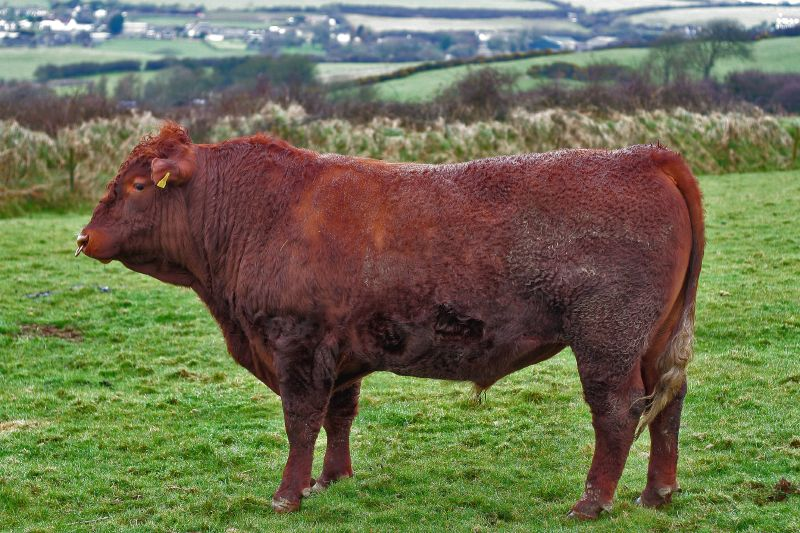
A Red Devon bull

The pasty is as popular in Devon as it is in Cornwall, and the earliest known record for the recipe was from the city of Plymouth in 1510, on the Devon-Cornish border. This is one of the principal sources of rivalry between the two counties, which in fact form a cultural continuum across the Westcountry; however, pasties made in Devon lack Protected Designation of Origin.

White pudding is a highly spiced pork dish still popular in Devon and Cornwall, where it is known as hog's pudding; versions are also known in the West Midlands, Scotland and elsewhere. A variant version containing oats is known as "groats pudding" and is found on Dartmoor and parts of Cornwall. Both Dartmoor and Exmoor are well known for their production of wild, free-grazing beef and lamb from regional breeds such as Red Ruby Devon cattle, South Devon cattle, the Greyface Dartmoor and the Devon Closewool sheep.

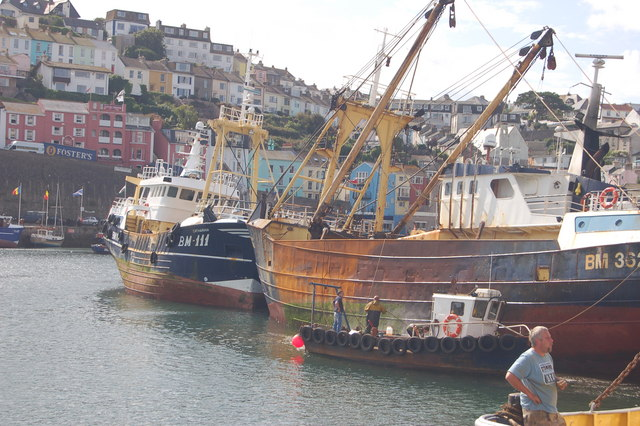
Brixham trawlers

Fish and chips remains particularly popular in the many coastal fishing ports.

=== Dairy produce ===
The county has given its name to a number of culinary specialities. The Devonshire cream tea, involving scones, sometimes known as Devonshire Splits, jam and clotted cream is considered to have originated in Devon (though claims have also been made for neighbouring counties); in other countries such as Australia and New Zealand, it is known as a "Devonshire tea".

Ice cream is also made by many Devon creameries and is known for its rich full cream taste. Typical flavours may include summer berries such as blackberry or blackcurrant and a local favourite is 'thunder and lightning' made with sugar honeycomb and golden syrup. Ice cream is also often served with additional Devon clotted cream which changes texture when frozen.

Curworthy, Sharpham and Vulscombe cheeses are all made in Devon. Devon Blue and Beenleigh Blue are made at a dairy on the Sharpham Estate.

The Ambrosia creamery, with its famous tagline "Devon knows how they make it so creamy", best known for its custard and creamed rice pudding, has been based in the village of Lifton since 1917.

Fudge, often made with Devon clotted cream, can be found all over Devon.

=== Fruit and vegetables ===
The way in which potatoes are served in Devonshire to breakfast is an excellent measure for supplying fat to the organism in a very palatable form. The potatoes having been boiled are placed in the frying-pan along with a liberal supply of bacon fat. They are then chopped small while heating,- and kept in the pan till the outside is browned.

— p 319, North Carolina Medical Journal, Volumes 19-20, 1887.

Potatoes feature prominently after presumably having been introduced to Devon and the rest of Europe by Sir Walter Raleigh of East Budleigh; they formed a major part of the agricultural labourer diet in the nineteenth century. An example dish is Homity pie, which traditionally is made with potatoes, onions and leeks.

An exceptional number of traditional varieties of apple are specific to Devon's ancient orchards, which share a history of cider production with Westcountry neighbours along with rare varieties of many other fruits including the Dittisham plum, a dessert variety grown there.

The Tamar Valley was historically famous for early season production of soft fruits in its sheltered south-facing valleys which were exported to London by rail.

== Drinks ==
Cider, known as 'Cyder' or 'Scrumpy' is the traditional drink of Devon. Labourers were often given an allowance of three pints per day. One of the most famous cider producers of the 20th century was Whiteways of Whimple, East Devon. They produced many internationally famous ciders and also some non-alcoholic variants including Cydrax and Peardrax. During Whiteway's heyday they boasted the largest cyder orchards in Britain. There is now a Whiteways museum and heritage centre next to the New Fountain Inn in the village of Whimple. Three Hammers is a brand of strong white cider made in Tiverton by the Devon Cider Company. There are still a large number of cider producers in Devon

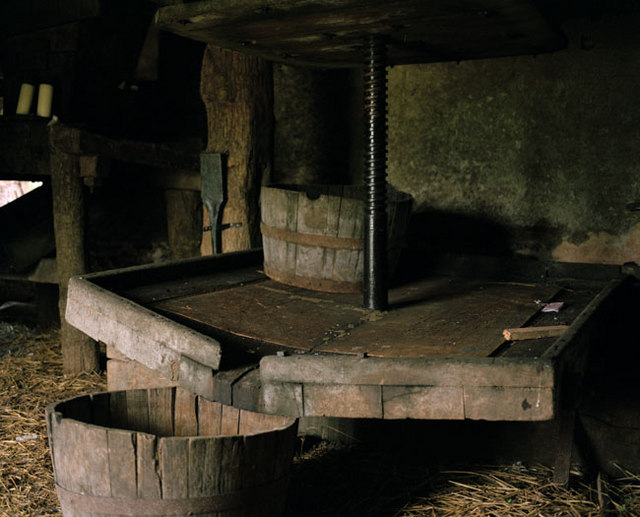
A Traditional Cider Press

Devon has a large number of beer breweries; two well known ones being Otter Brewery (located at Luppitt near Honiton) and Dartmoor Brewery, which, being based in Princetown on Dartmoor, is the highest brewery in England at 1,400 feet (430 m) above sea level. The Heavitree Brewery was a local brewer, located in Heavitree; its history can be traced back to 1790. It was the last brewery in Exeter to cease production, continuing until 1970; the brewery buildings were demolished in 1980. The name continues in use as the owner of a chain of pubs in south west England, and Heavitree Brewery PLC continues as a quoted company with its address in Exeter.

The Plymouth Gin Distillery has been producing Plymouth Gin since 1793. During the 1930s, it was the most widely distributed gin and has a controlled term of origin.

There are now a number of vineyards in Devon producing white wines, the oldest being Yearlstone Vineyard which was started in 1976 at Bickleigh in the valley of the River Exe. Others include Sharpham Vineyard, near Totnes, and Pebblebed Vineyard near Topsham. The monks of Buckfast Abbey still produce Buckfast Tonic Wine which has down-market cult status in Scotland.

Devon has a strong association with the old Westcountry tradition of alcoholic cordials such as Lovage, Grenadine and Shrub.

== See also ==
- Cornish cuisine
- Cuisine of Dorset
