= Dublin Zoo =

Zoo in Dublin, Ireland

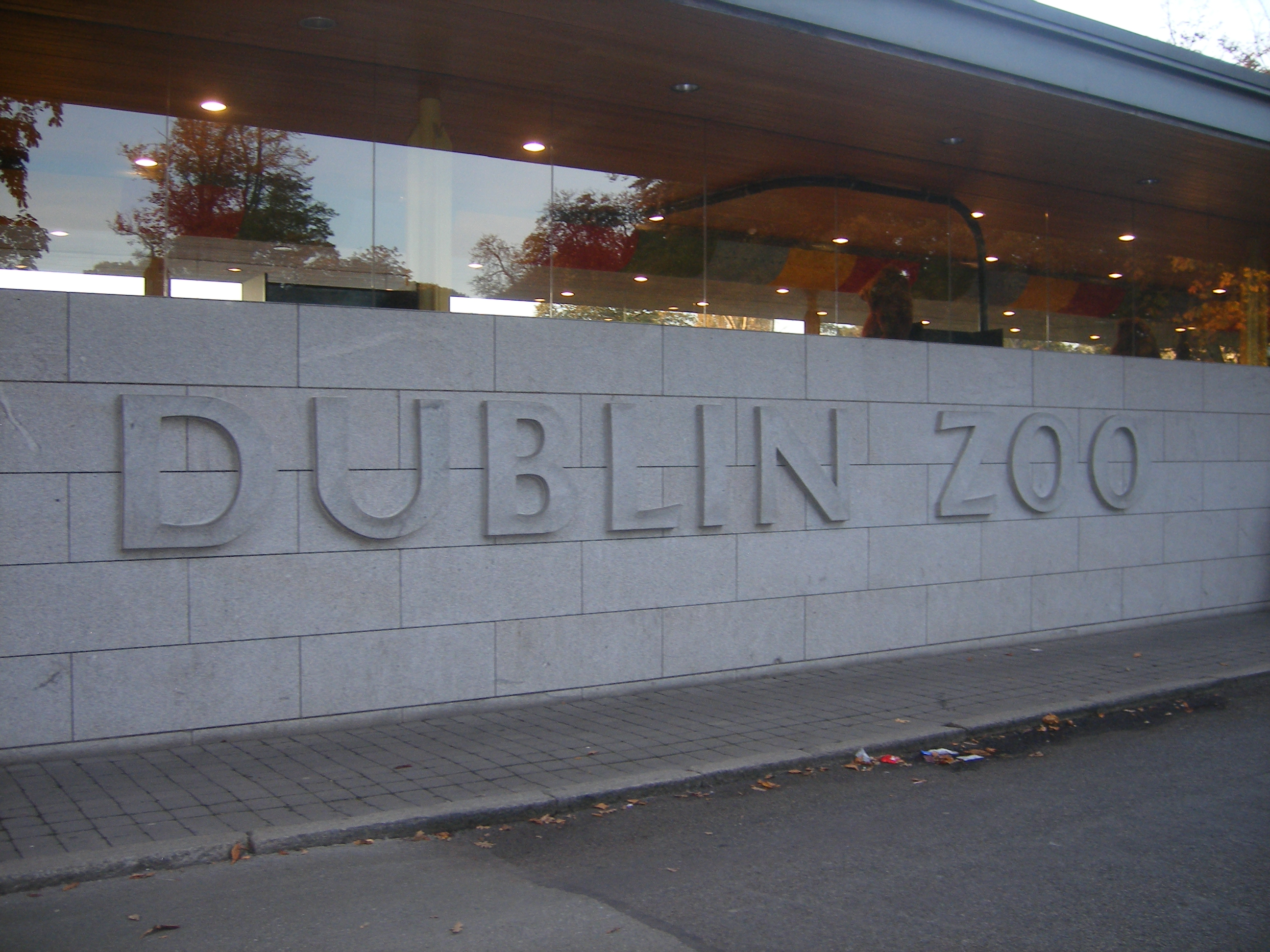
- Dublin Zoo entrance
- Interactive map of Dublin Zoo
- 53°21′14″N 6°18′14″W
- Date opened: 1 September 1831; 194 years ago
- Location: Dublin, Ireland
- Land area: 28 ha (69 acres)
- No. of animals: 400
- No. of species: 100
- Annual visitors: 1+ million
- Memberships: British and Irish Association of Zoos and Aquariums, European Association of Zoos and Aquaria, World Association of Zoos and Aquariums
- Major exhibits: African Plains, Asian Forests, Family Farm, Himalayan Hills, Kaziranga Forest Trail, Sea Lion Cove, South American House, Wolves in the Woods, World of Primates, Zoorassic World
- Website: www.dublinzoo.ie

Dublin Zoo (Irish: Zú Bhaile Átha Cliath), in Phoenix Park, is a zoo in Dublin, Ireland, and one of Dublin's most popular attractions. Established and designed in 1830 by Decimus Burton, it opened the following year. Today, it focuses on conservation projects, breeding programmes, and growing awareness for animals. Its stated mission is to "work in partnership with zoos worldwide to make a significant contribution to the conservation of the endangered species on Earth".

Covering over 28 hectares (69 acres) of Phoenix Park, the zoo is divided into habitats including the Himalayan Hills, Wolves in the Woods, the African Savanna, Kaziranga Forest Trail, South American House, Zoorassic World, Gorilla Rainforest, Orangutan Forest, Sea Lion Cove, and Family Farm (as of July 2022). Overall, the zoo houses about 400 animals across 100 species and attracts over one million visitors each year.

== History ==
=== 19th century ===
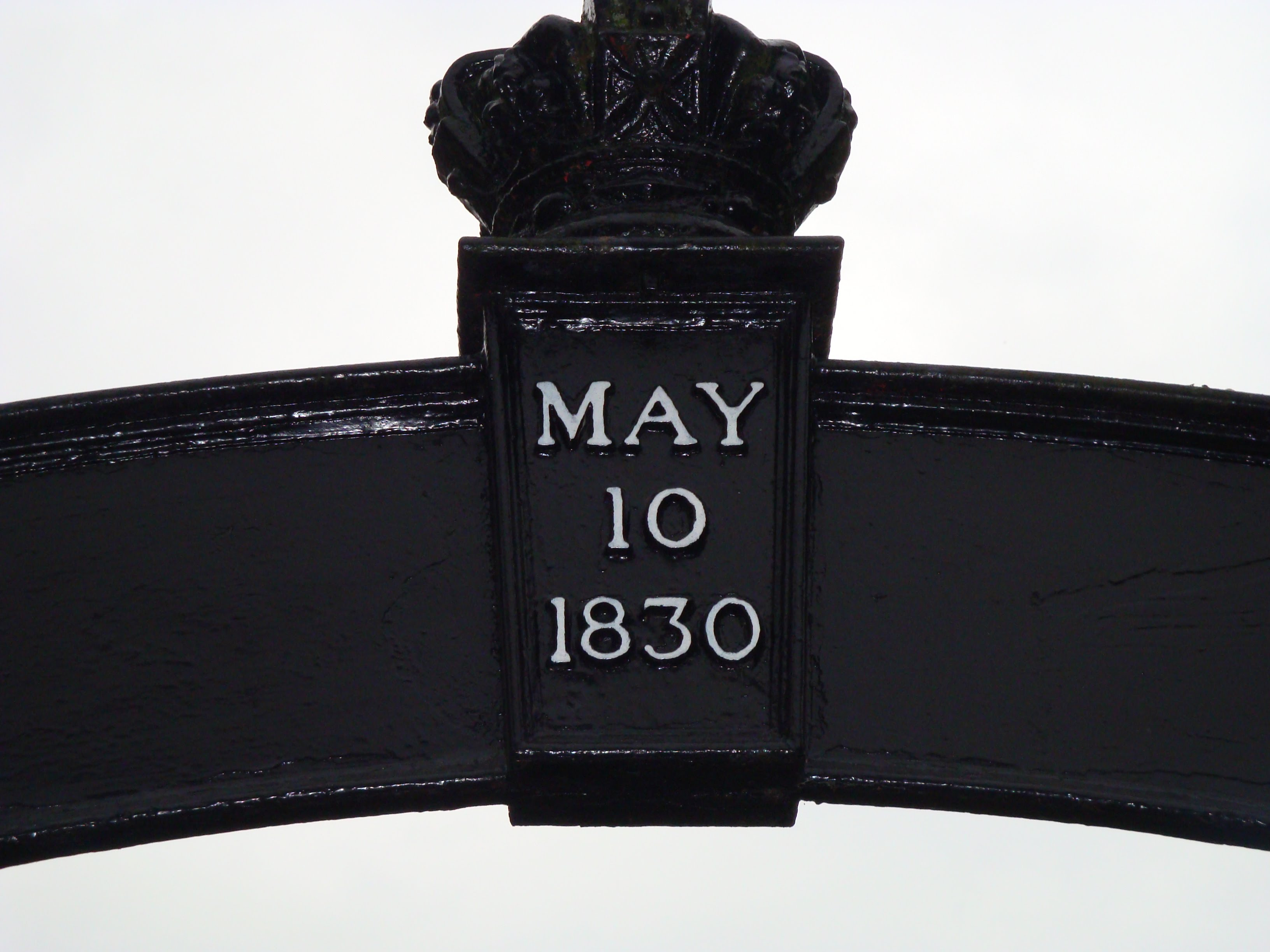
Iron gateway marking the establishment of Dublin Zoo on 10 May 1830

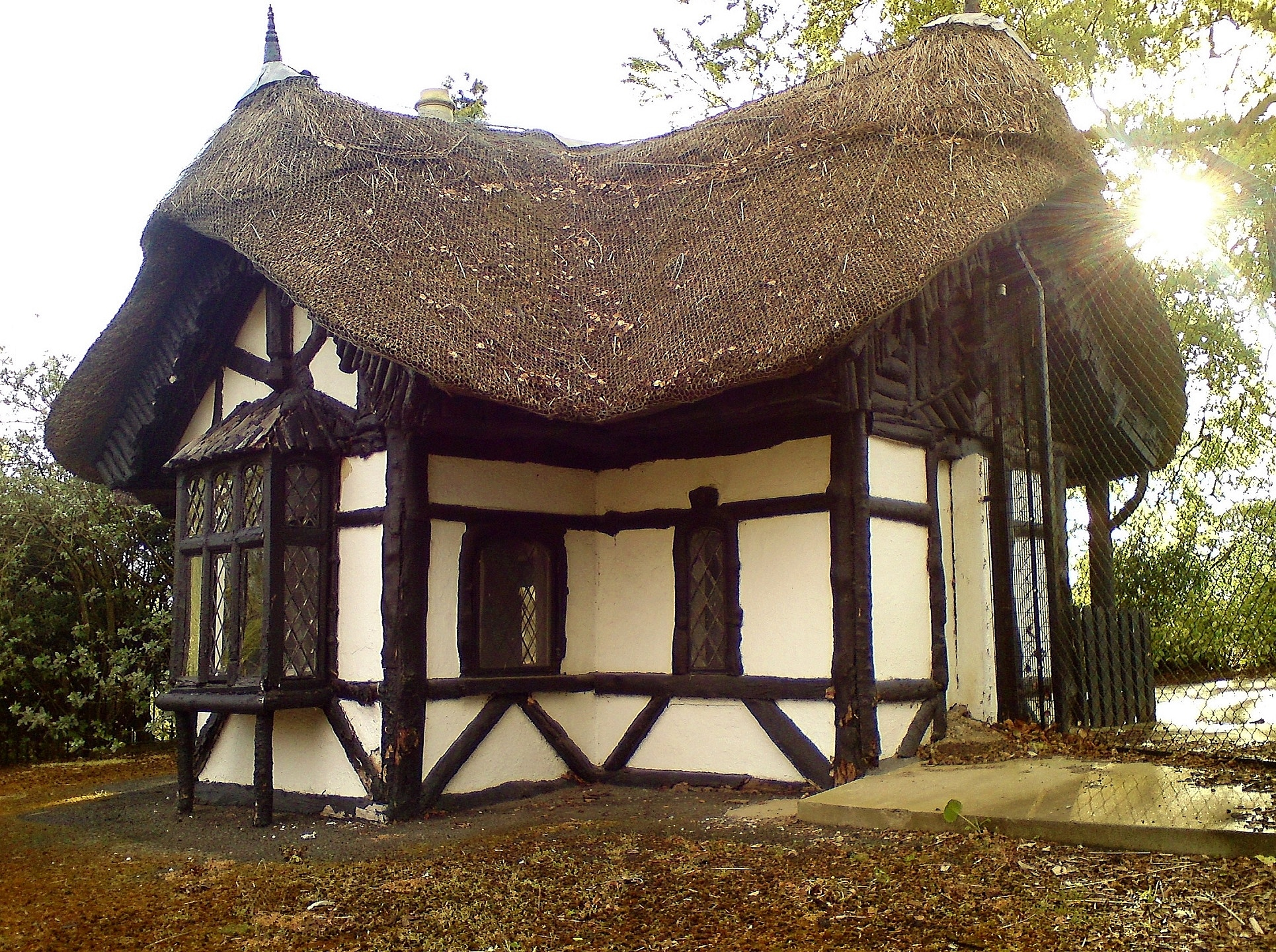
Original zoo lodge, built in 1833.

The Royal Zoological Society of Dublin was established at a meeting held at the Rotunda Hospital on 10 May 1830 and the zoo, then called the Zoological Gardens Dublin, was opened to the public on 1 September 1831. The animals, 46 mammals and 72 birds, were donated by London Zoo and Royal Menagerie of the Tower of London.

Initially, the entrance fee was one shilling. What made Dublin Zoo very different from some of its contemporaries was a decision to reduce the charge to one penny on Sundays. This choice made the Zoo popular among the less wealthy.

In 1833, the original cottage-style entrance lodge to the zoo was built at a cost of £30 and in early days also housed staff. The thatch-roofed building is still visible to the right of the current entrance. In 1838, to celebrate the coronation of Queen Victoria, the zoo held an open day – 20,000 people visited, which is still the highest number of visitors in one day.

In 1844 the zoo received its first giraffe, and in 1855 it bought its first pair of lions which bred for the first time in 1857. After leaving office, President of the United States Ulysses S. Grant was among the celebrities who came to see Dublin's world-famous lions in the 19th century. Reptiles got their own house in 1876 and the first tearooms were built in 1898.

=== 20th century ===
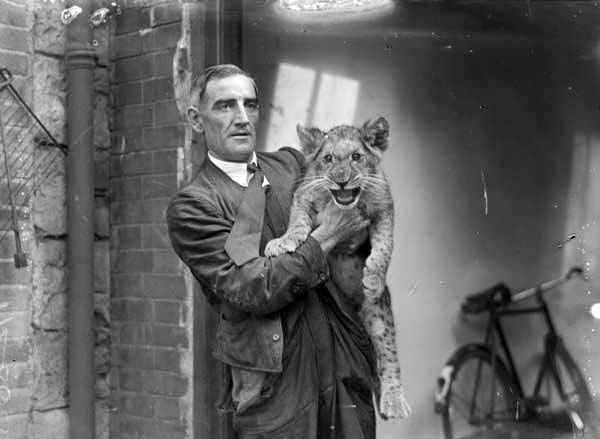
Charlie Flood, son of Christopher Flood, two longtime Dublin Zoo employees, with a lion cub c. 1936

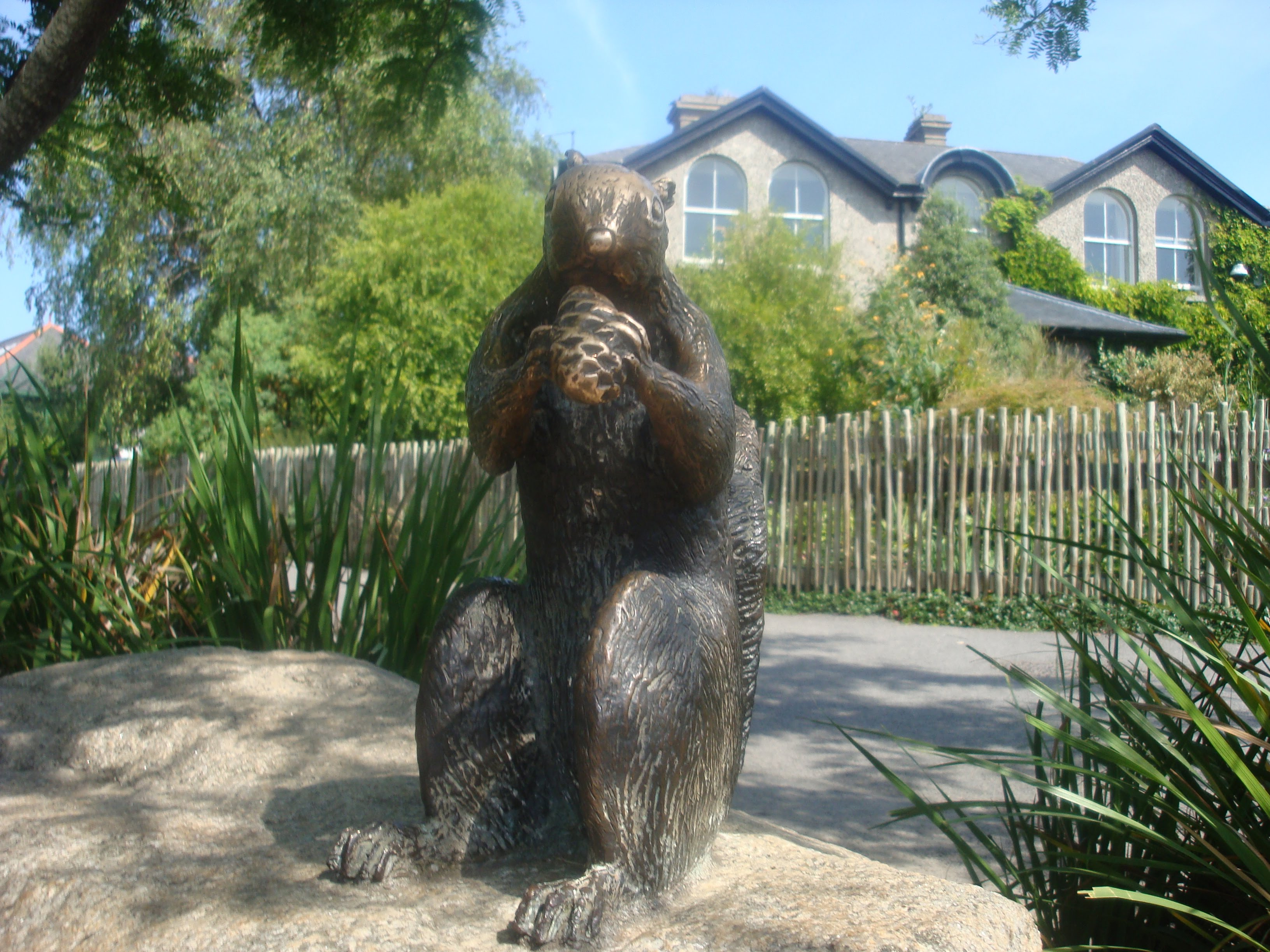
Squirrel sculpture marking 150th anniversary of Dublin Zoo in 1980, unveiled by President Patrick Hillery.

Zoo employee Christopher Flood's son Jack stayed in the zoo during the 1916 Easter Rising to care for the animals with two other young keepers, dealing with food shortages for the animals amongst other problems. He died shortly after from the Spanish flu in his twenties.

On 9 June 1903, an elephant named Sita killed her keeper while he nursed her injured foot. She was put down by members of the Royal Irish Constabulary. Times of trouble and war also caused problems for the zoo. Meat ran out during the Easter Rising of 1916. In order to keep the lions and tigers alive, some of the other animals in the zoo were killed. A lion named Slats was born at the zoo on 20 March 1919, and was one of many lions filmed by the Hollywood film studio Metro-Goldwyn-Mayer (MGM) in 1928 to be used as their mascot Leo.

Between 1989 and 1990, the financial situation at the zoo became so serious that the council considered closing it. The Government then gave it a meaningful annual grant in line with what happens in other European countries. Thirteen hectares (32 acres) of land surrounding the lake in the grounds of Áras an Uachtaráin were added in 1997. This made a profound improvement in the amount of space available for the animals.

=== 21st century ===
In 2002, a twenty-eight-year-old hippo named Linda was thrown a tennis ball by a visitor. While she caught the ball, it became lodged in her intestines and she died soon after.

A male and female polar bear couple named Ootec and Spunky were transferred to Dublin Zoo in the early 1980s from Winnipeg Zoo, and lived in "cramped conditions" until approximately 1998 when a new enclosure was built for them in the zoo. In 2003, it was reported that Spunky, the female of the two, had been "exhibiting signs of stress when close to the male", and did not have space in which to retreat from him when needed, exhibiting "continued pacing behaviour" which concerned zoo staff, including zoo director Leo Ooterweghel. Eventually, the two bears were moved to Sóstó Zoo, Hungary in which they were given more space allowing each polar bear to "spend time by themselves" if they so chose but also to come together when needed. Sligo band Those Nervous Animals wrote a song about Spunky in 2003 named "The Polar Bear".

In 2005, the Kaziranga Forest Trail was opened. It is now home to eleven Asian elephants; Bernhardine, Yasmin, Asha and Anak, the four mature females. Kavi, Ashoka and Samiya the five-year-old calves, and the newest additions, Zinda, Avani, Kabir and Sanjay.

In 2009, the African Savannah was opened in the African Plains section of the zoo. It is now home to species such as the giraffe, zebra, ostrich, scimitar-horned oryx, and southern white rhino.

In 2010, Dublin Zoo received 963,053 visitors. In 2015, Dublin Zoo was the third most popular visitor attraction in Ireland with 1,105,005 visitors. The year 2015 also saw the death of the well-known and loved silverback western lowland gorilla Harry. During his life at Dublin Zoo, Harry produced many offspring; thus contributing greatly to the conservation of his species.

The documentary TV series The Zoo produced by Moondance Productions is filmed almost entirely on location at Dublin Zoo, and began broadcast on TV3 in 2010, before moving to RTÉ One in Ireland in 2011. It is also broadcast on VRT in Belgium since 2011 and on Discovery Animal Planet in the UK since 2012.

In November 2020 during the COVID-19 pandemic, the public donated over 2 million euro in two days to the zoo to support it.

In Seanad Éireann in July 2022, Annie Hoey reported allegations from whistleblowers of the mistreatment since 2016 of terminally ill animals, including Harry the gorilla, and of the escape or loss since 2019 of two Celebes crested macaques, a white-collared mangabey, and a citron-crested cockatoo. The zoo said it "vehemently disputes" the allegations.

In 2024, two elephants in the zoo died due to Elephant Endotheliotropic Herpesvirus (EEHV). By August 2024, and after "unprecedented support from international veterinary experts, other zoos, and cooperation from An Garda Síochána, as well as the Irish and British governments", the zoo announced a clean bill of health for the remaining elephants.

In 2026, the Zoo announced a promotion of free entry for mothers for the occasion of Mother’s Day & St Patrick’s Day. The promotion featured the comedian James Patrice portraying a character called "The Malahide Mammy".

== Animals and exhibits ==
As the result of protests against the standard of animal housing and welfare, led by former keeper Brendan Price, a "Plan for the Future of Dublin Zoo" was prepared by the Zoological Society of Ireland and the Office of Public Works. In 1994 it was presented to Minister of Finance Bertie Ahern. The government granted the zoo IR£15 million (€28 million, adjusted to 2017 inflation levels) for improvements. Themed areas were decided on and the first, World of Primates, opened to the public in 1996. The latest, African Plains, opened in 2001.

=== African Plains and Related Exhibits ===
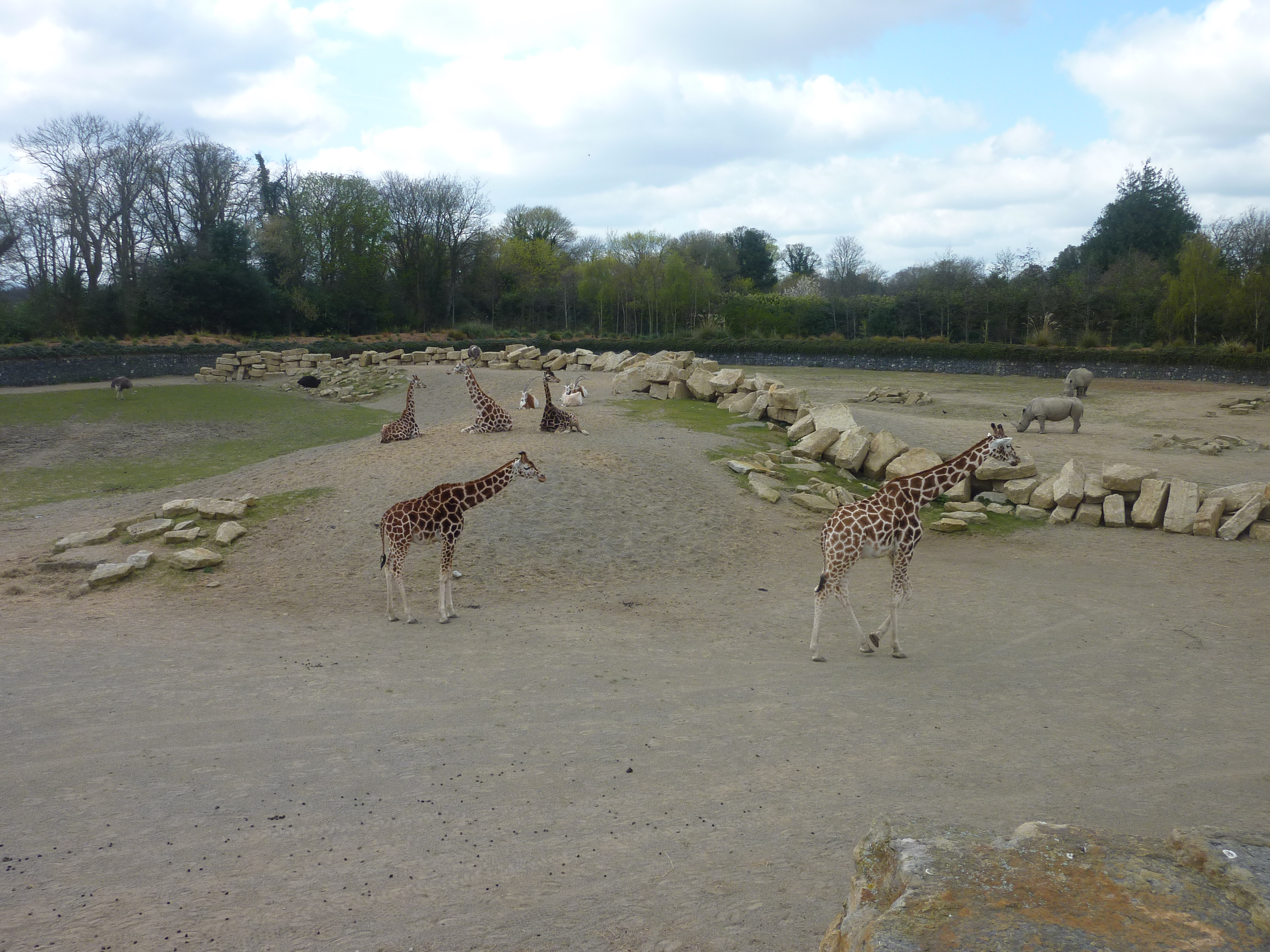
The African Savanna houses multiple animals similar to natural habitats where animals coexist.

African Plains is an Africa-themed area that covers 13 hectares and was opened in 2001. The main exhibit in African Plains is the "African Savanna", which houses scimitar-horned oryx, southern white rhinoceros, Rothschild's giraffes and Grant's zebras, all of which, apart from the rhinos, who have a separate enclosure, share a large, outdoor paddock. Gorilla Rainforest, an exhibit opened in 2012, houses a troop of western lowland gorillas: a silverback male named Bangui, two adult females named Kafi and Vana, and two young females named Asali and Kambiri, both of which were born in 2011 and 2019 respectively.

Other animals displayed nearby, are western chimpanzees, hippopotamus, white-naped mangabeys, African spurred tortoises, Abyssinian ground hornbills, red river hogs, okapis, eastern bongo and a Northeast African cheetah, with the last seven species residing in an exhibit called African Forests. The area also features an Africa-themed restaurant (named the Nakuru Restaurant) and a gift shop. The zoo's last African lion died in 2012, so the zoo later received three Asiatic lions. A baby scimitar-horned oryx was born in December 2016.

=== Himalayan Hills ===
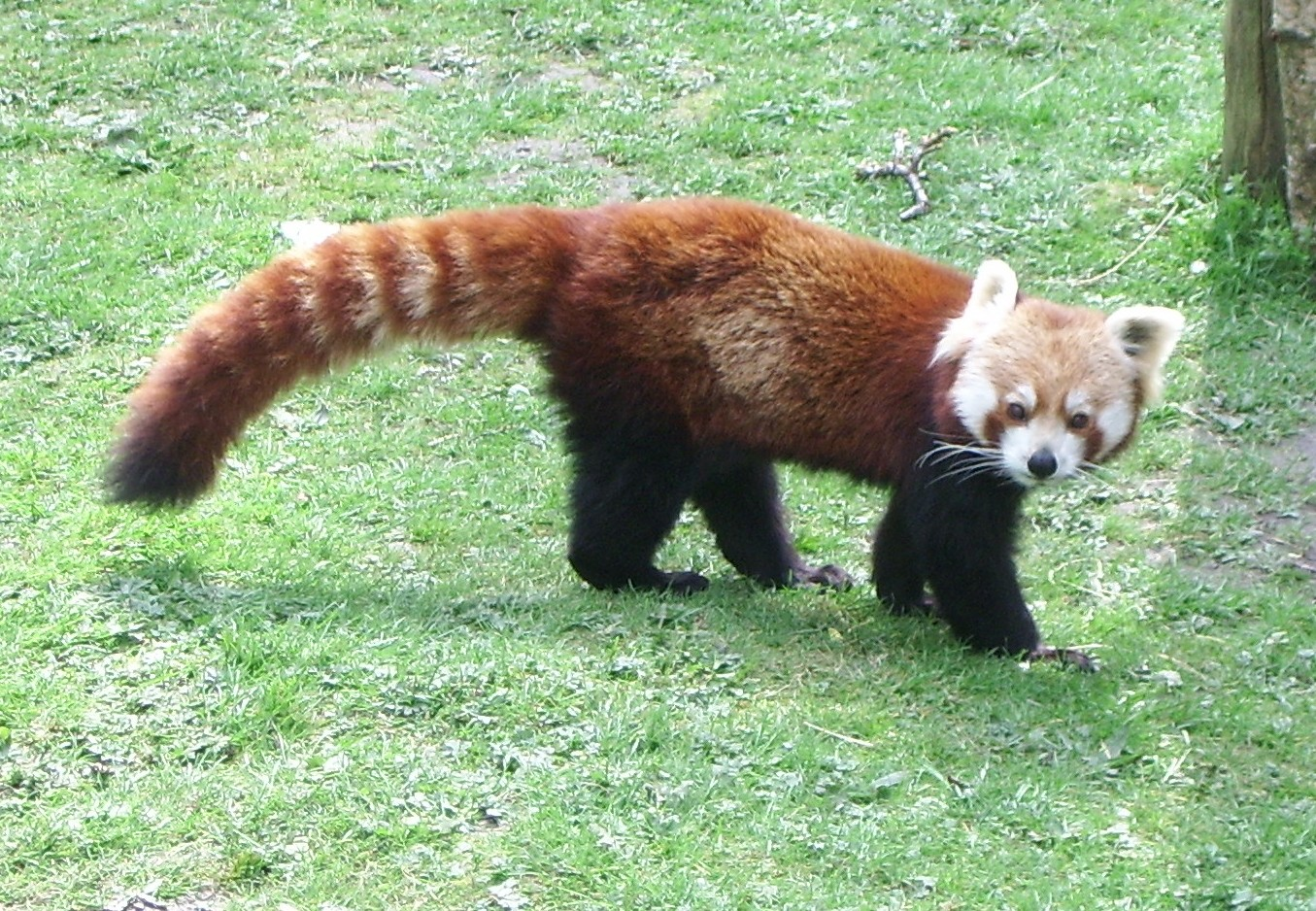
Red panda (Ailurus fulgens).

Themed after a Nepalese village, Himalayan Hills houses snow leopards and red pandas, two species native to the Himalayas.

=== Zoorassic World ===
Dublin Zoo's Reptile House was opened in 1876 as the Roberts House with the intention of housing big cats.

Later, the Roberts House was repurposed for birds, before becoming a reptile house in 2017. Also included is a T.Rex fossil replica.

=== Asian Forests ===
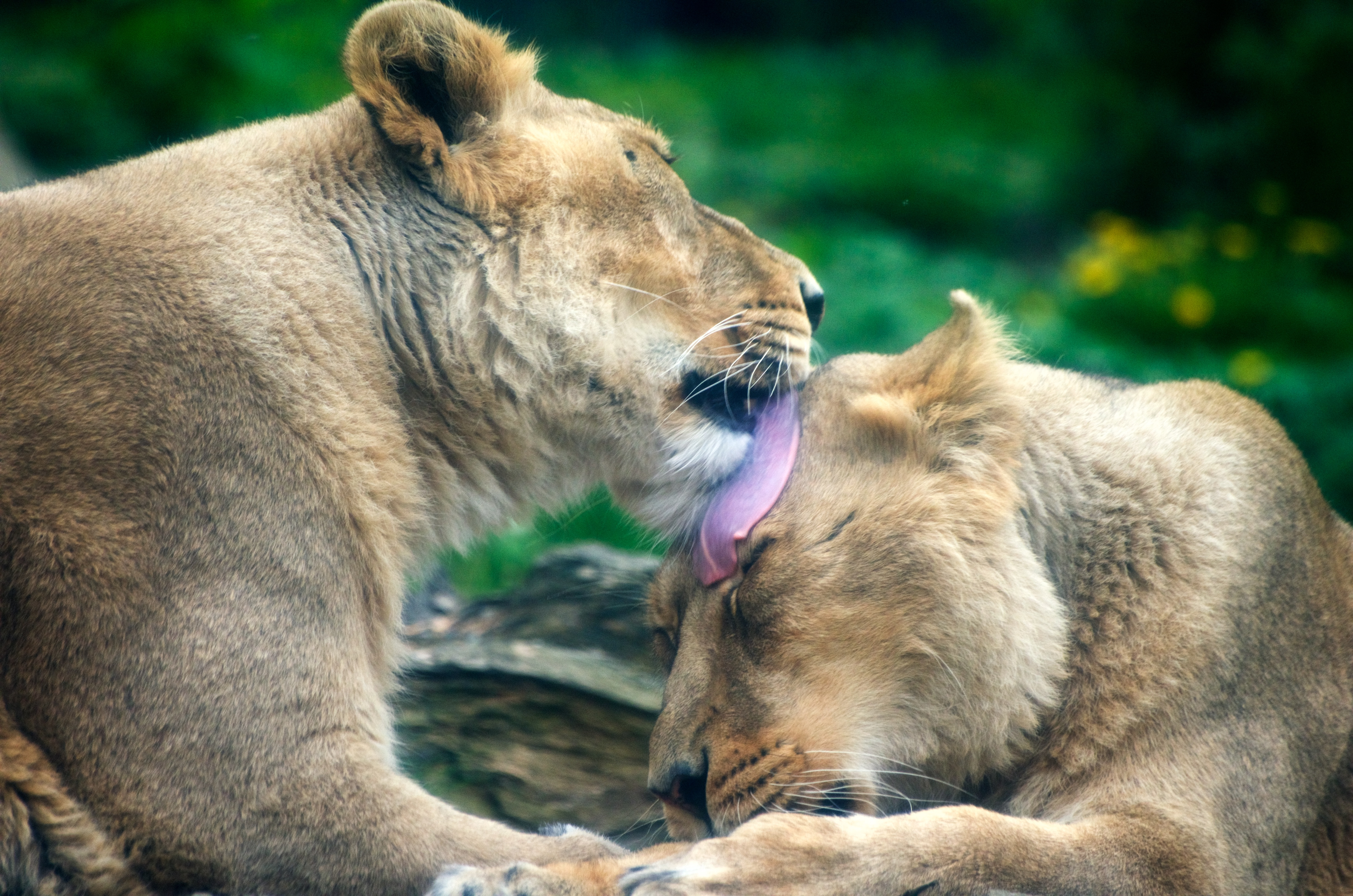
Asiatic lions bonding through grooming.

Asian Forests was originally opened in 1998, under the name "World of Cats". The exhibit consists of five enclosures, one housing Asiatic lions and designed to resemble the Gir forest in India, the second housing Sulawesi crested macaques designed to look like the rainforests in Sulawesi, Indonesia, the third housing Amur tigers designed to resemble the forests of Amur in Russia, China and North Korea, the fourth housing Chinese dholes and the fifth housing citron-crested cockatoos.

=== The Kaziranga Forest Trail ===
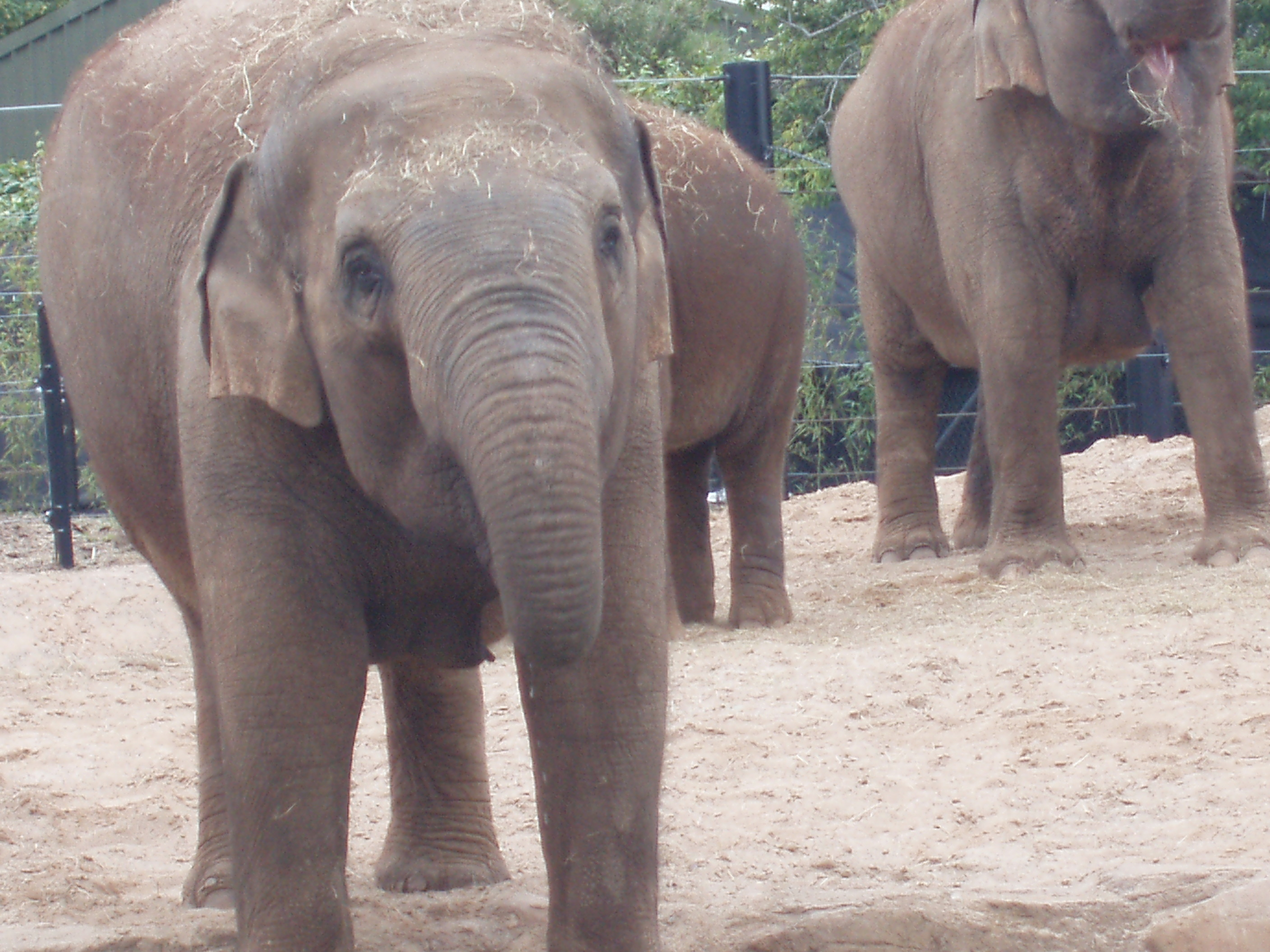
Yasmin, an Asian elephant in the Kaziranga Forest Trail.

Opened in June 2007, the Kaziranga Forest Trail is Dublin Zoo's Asian elephant enclosure and is named after the Kaziranga National Park in India. The zoo is home to 11 elephants, including two adult females named Bernhardine and Yasmin, two younger females named Asha (Bernhardine's daughter) and Anak (Yasmin's daughter) and a bull named Upali. Upali left in 2019 for Le Pal zoo in France.

The enclosure features a waterfall and two pools for the elephants, as well as sheltered viewing areas and a children's playground for visitors, and the elephants share their enclosure with a breeding pair of blackbuck. The zoo currently does not house any blackbuck, however, its website displays the species, possibly indicating that it will return to the collection in the future. It is also home to two young male elephants named Kavi and Ashoka who were born on 17 July and 19 August 2014 and a young female Samiya who was born on 17 September 2014. The Kaziranga Forest Trail most recently became home to two female calves, Zinda born on 19 September 2016 and Avani born on 13 March 2017 and two male calves, Kabir, born on 15 May 2017 and Sanjay, born on 10 February 2018.

=== South American House ===
Dublin Zoo's South American House has various species from Central and South America, including golden lion tamarins, Goeldi's marmosets, Linnaeus's two-toed sloths, Bolivian squirrel monkeys, white-faced sakis, Venezuelan red howlers and a single Asian species, the Crested partridge.

=== World of Primates ===
The World of Primates exhibit opened to the public in 1996, and houses contain various species of apes and monkeys. The area comprises a string of man-made islands in a natural lake. The islands range in size from 15 to 30 square metres and are linked by wooden bridges to sleeping quarters on the lake shore.

Some of the islands have climbing frames available for all the animals present in this location. Areas of each island have been sectioned off with hot-wire to facilitate the growth of vegetation and give each island a more natural appearance. On some islands, areas of foraging substrate, such as bark, have been provided to facilitate scatter feeding.

The provision of large viewing windows in the sleeping quarters gives the public access to what is generally an off-show area in many zoos. However, there are areas where the animals can hide from the public in order to receive privacy.

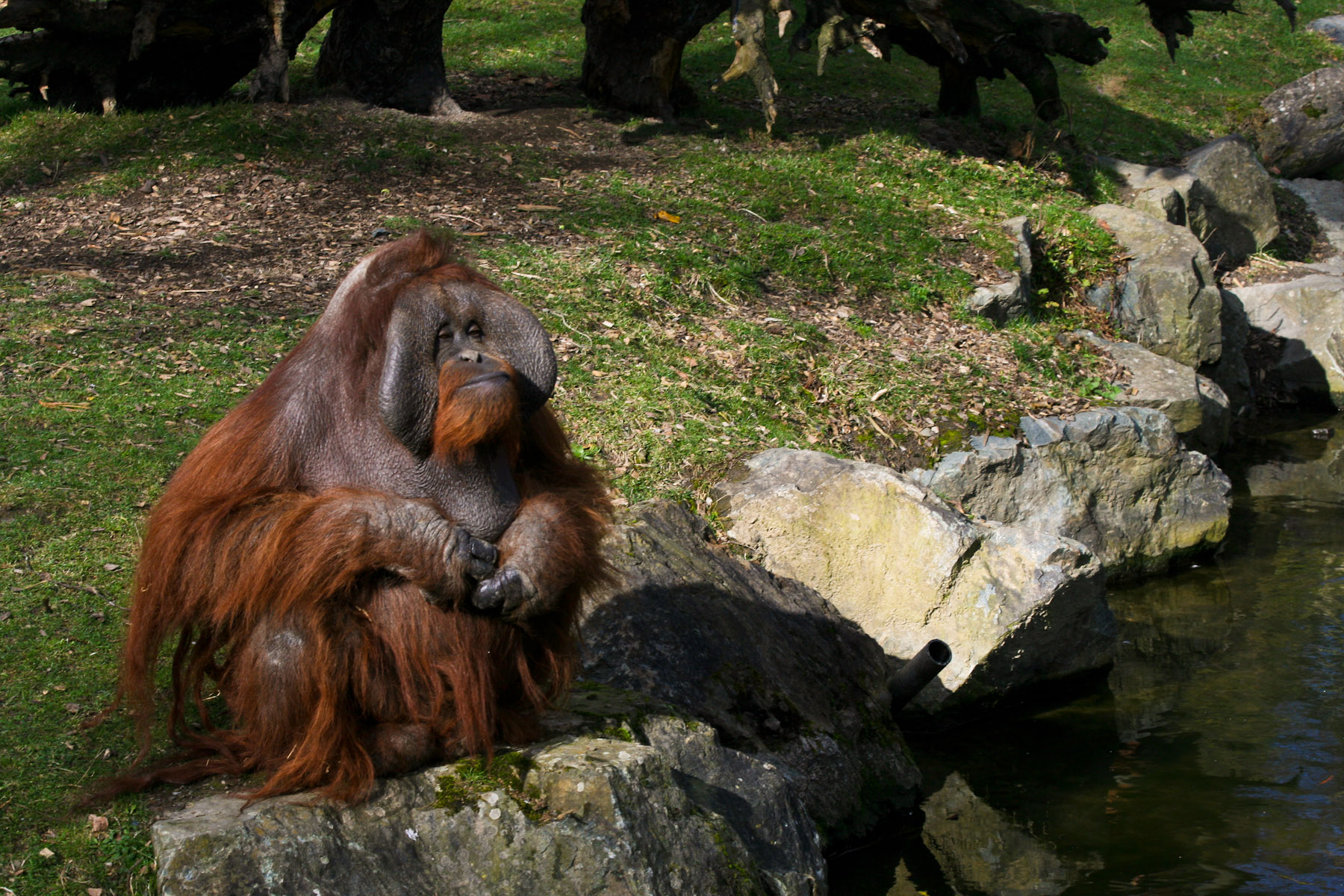
A Bornean orangutan, one of the various species from the World of Primates houses in Dublin Zoo.

The islands mentioned above are inhabited by siamangs, red ruffed lemurs, ring-tailed lemurs, and Celebes crested macaques. Each species has unlimited access to its outdoor enclosures both day and night all year round. The zoo has succeeded in breeding the primates on these islands. The Celebes crested macaque group have done exceptionally well since their introduction to the island, and success has also been achieved with the lemurs and siamangs.

In early 2008, an orangutan escaped her enclosure. She had escaped for an hour and was on top of the Sumatran tiger night house before a group of school children alerted staff. That same year, an orangutan named Jorong was seen rescuing an injured moorhen chick from a pond, "patiently coaxing the bird ashore with a leaf before gently lifting it onto grass"; the rescue became known to the wider public in June 2011, when a four-minute video of the event was posted to YouTube.

=== Family Farm ===
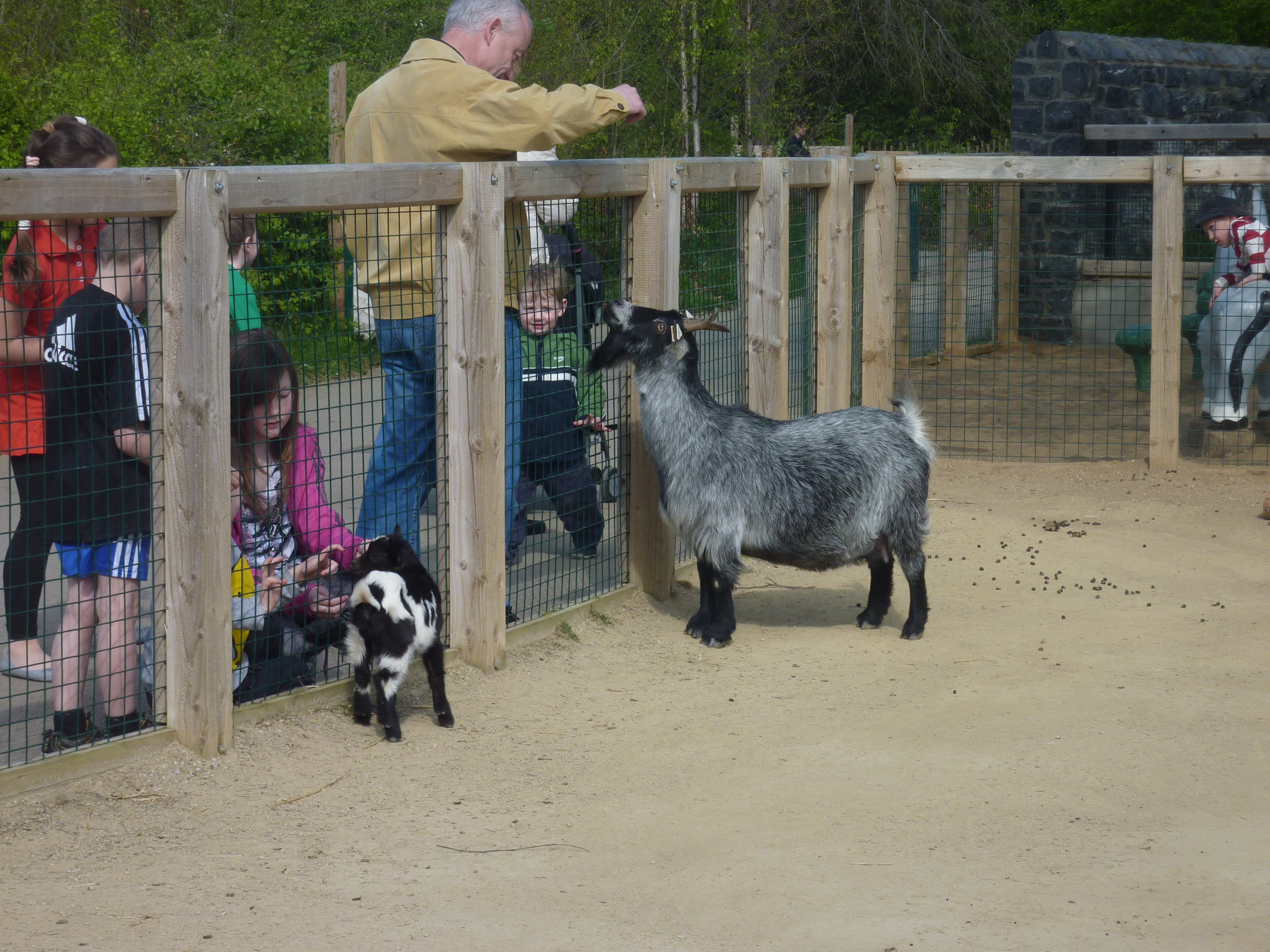
Pygmy goats being fed at the Family Farm.

Family Farm (formerly known as City Farm) originally opened in 1999, and re-developed in 2010. The area is designed to teach the public about modern Irish farming, and is a joint venture between Dublin Zoo and Agri Aware, a charitable trust that works to improve the image and understanding of Ireland's farming and food industry amongst the general public.

Domestic livestock kept in Family Farm include Greyface Dartmoor sheep, Cheviot sheep, pygmy goats, Tamworth pigs named Rose and Ginger, Australorp chickens, call ducks, Indian Runner ducks, Simmental cows, a white rabbit named Roger and a Holstein Friesian cow named Bella.

=== Sea Lion Cove ===
President of Ireland Michael D. Higgins opened the new Sea Lion Cove habitat in June 2015. Sea Lion Cove is home to the colony of California sea lions, three females, Cassie, Florence and Seanna, and one male, Nico. The new saltwater habitat is the biggest and most exciting development undertaken by Dublin Zoo in recent years. It is inspired by the natural environment of the California sea lions and it includes a state-of-the-art water filtration plant.

=== Nocturnal House ===
A nocturnal house opened in July 2023 near Sea Lion cove, to accommodate nocturnal Aye-Aye lemurs, transferred from Bristol Zoo. Aye-Aye are endangered on the IUCN red list.

=== Other animals ===
Other animals in Dublin Zoo's collection that are not part of a specific themed area include, Chilean flamingos, Humboldt penguins, Giant anteaters, free-ranging Indian peafowl, the Asiatic lions outside of the Asian Forests exhibit, meerkats, South American tapirs, and waldrapp ibises.

=== Former exhibits ===
==== Wolves in the Woods ====
Wolves in the Woods was an exhibition housing grey wolves.

== Conservation ==
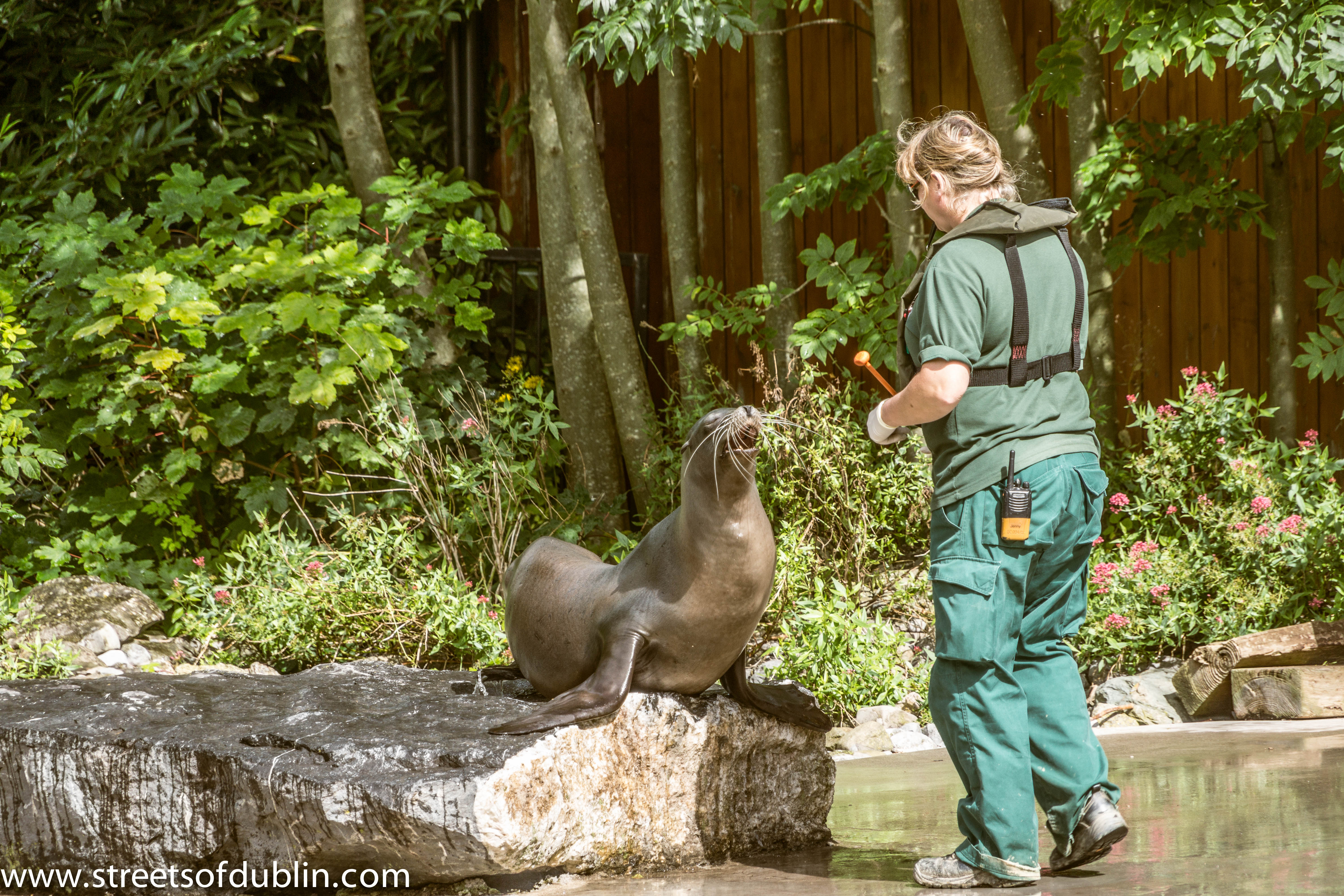
Seanna had recently given birth to a male Californian sea lion pup, just one of the many breeding programs at the zoo.

The zoo is part of a worldwide programme to breed endangered species. It is a member of the European Endangered Species Programme (EEP), which helps the conservation of endangered species in Europe. Each species supervised by the EEP has a single coordinator that is responsible for the building of breeding groups with the aim of obtaining a genetically balanced population. In November 2023 the Zoo opened the National Centre for Species Survival in partnership with the IUCN, in the renovated Society House, beside the Meerkat Restaurant.

Dublin Zoo manages the EEP for the golden lion tamarin and the Moluccan cockatoo. It also houses members of the species Goeldi's monkey and the white-faced saki which are part of EEPs coordinated by other zoos. The focus is on conservation, which includes breeding and protecting endangered species, as well as research, study and education.

=== Rodrigues fruit bats ===
Rodrigues fruit bats are one of Dublin Zoo's endangered species. Fruit bats, as their name suggests, feed on fruit and because of that are very important to the rainforest. Bats cannot digest the seeds and pips of the fruit that they eat and so the seeds leave the bat's digestive system "wrapped" in fertilizer. Without bats, many rainforest trees would not be able to sow their own seeds.

Upon completion of the Kaziranga Forest Trail, the Rodrigues fruit bats were moved to the Roberts House (or bird house). With the conversion of the Robert's House to Zoorassic world, Dublin Zoo no longer has a population of Rodrigues fruit bats.

=== Golden lion tamarins ===
This tiny monkey, named for the long gold-coloured hair around its head which resembles a lion's mane, is one of the rarest primates in the world. Golden lion tamarins, like many of the other tamarins found in South America, are threatened with extinction in their natural habitat. Dublin Zoo is involved in the international breeding programme and helps to fund researchers who study tamarins in Brazil.

The forests that golden lion tamarins need in order to survive are cut down for timber and to make room for cattle ranches, farms and urbanization. Sometimes very small areas or 'pockets' of forest are left but these are too small for the tamarins to survive in. In the past, tamarins were collected for sale to the pet trade or for use in research laboratories. The golden lion tamarins are located in the South American house.

=== Moluccan cockatoos ===
Dublin Zoo holds the European studbook for Moluccan cockatoos. A studbook is a record of all the individuals of a particular species that are held in zoos in a region. It contains information such as the sex of the animal, how old it is and who its parents were. This information is then used to decide which birds should be paired with which to get the best genetic mix. This ensures that the captive population stays as genetically healthy as possible. Moluccan cockatoos have white or pale pink feathers and a pink crest, and are on the endangered species list.

== Gallery ==
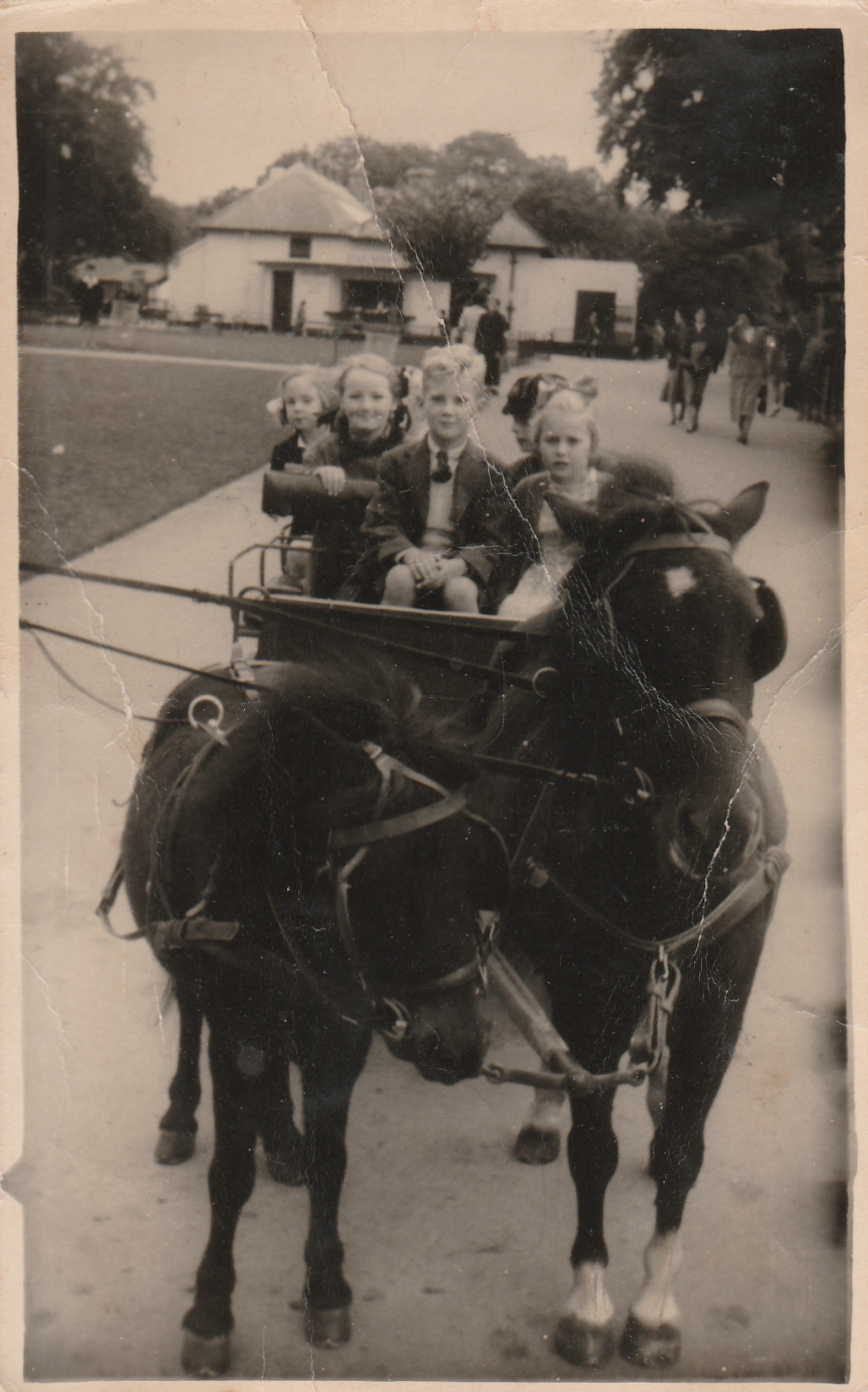
Children on a pony carriage ride, 1954

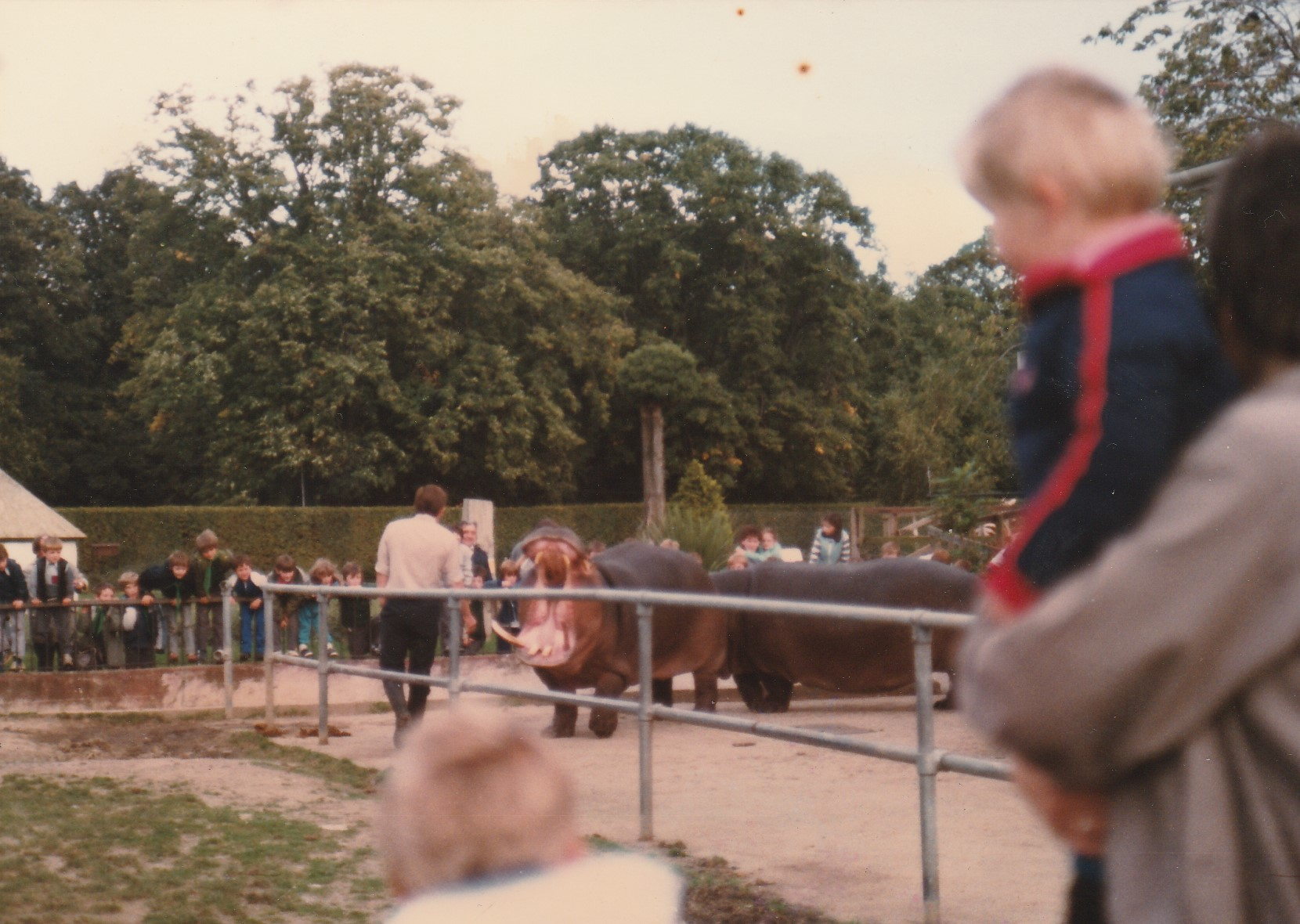
The hippopotamus enclosure in 1985

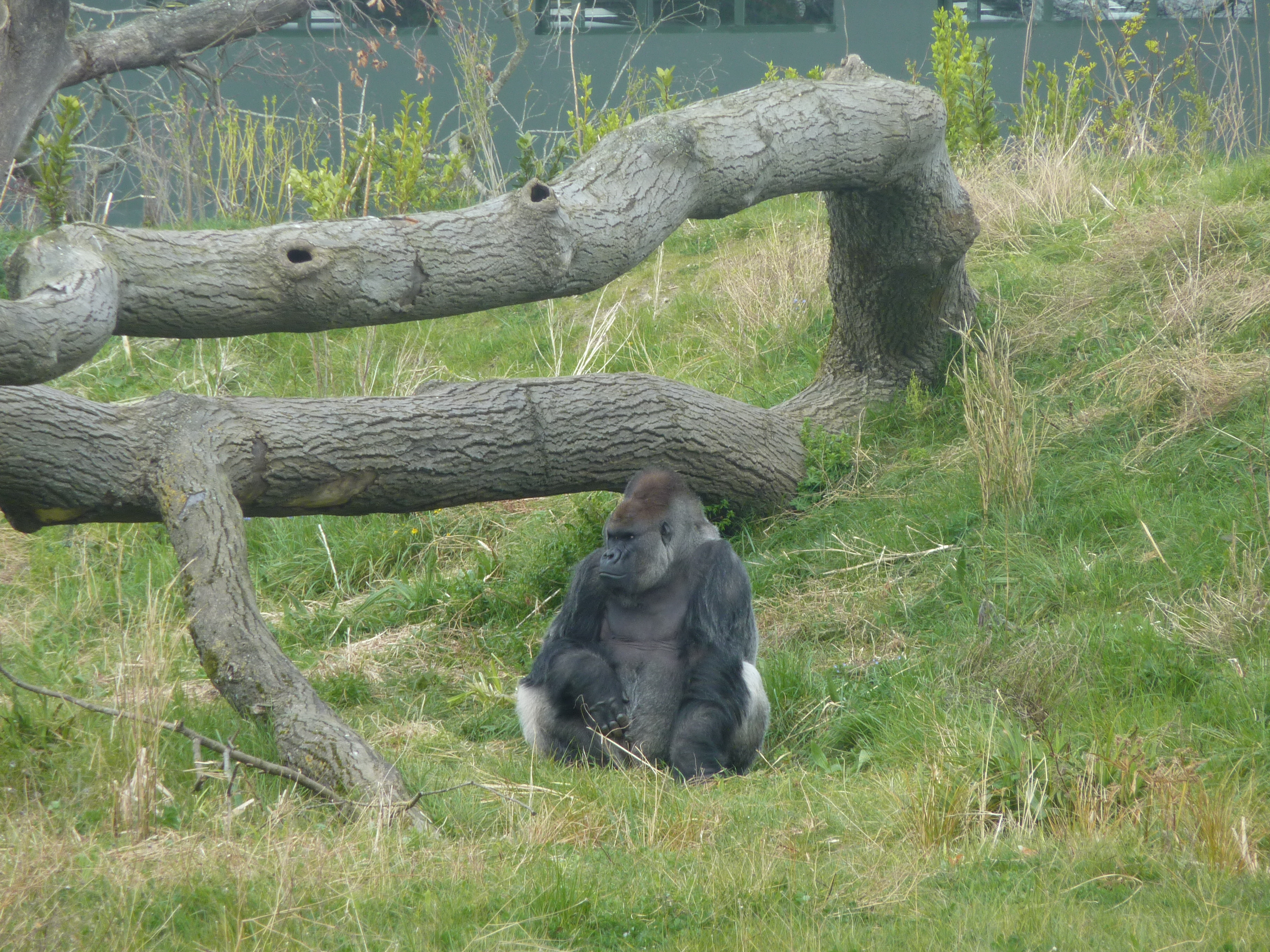
Gorilla habitat

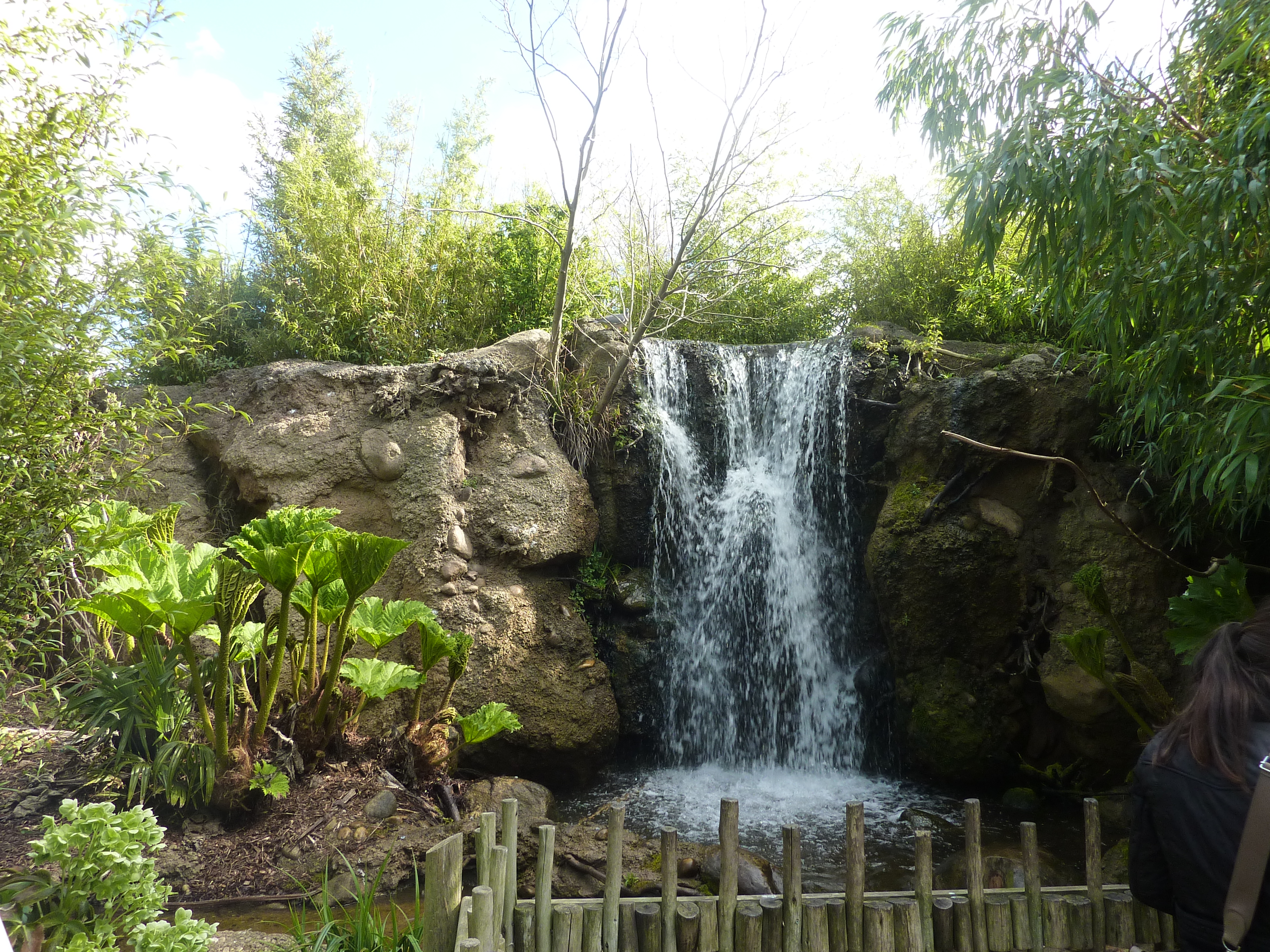
A waterfall at the zoo

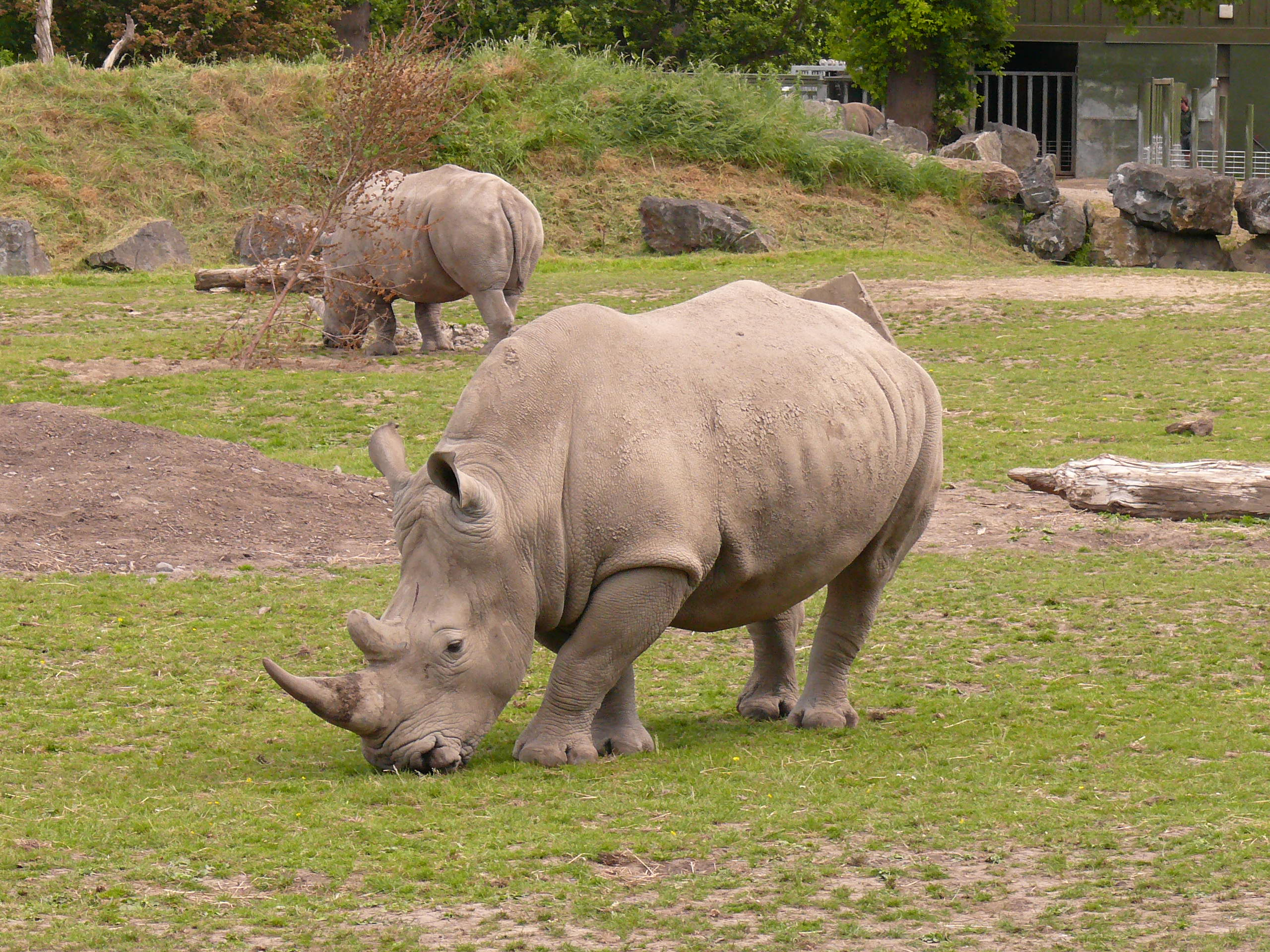
White rhinoceros (Ceratotherium simum)

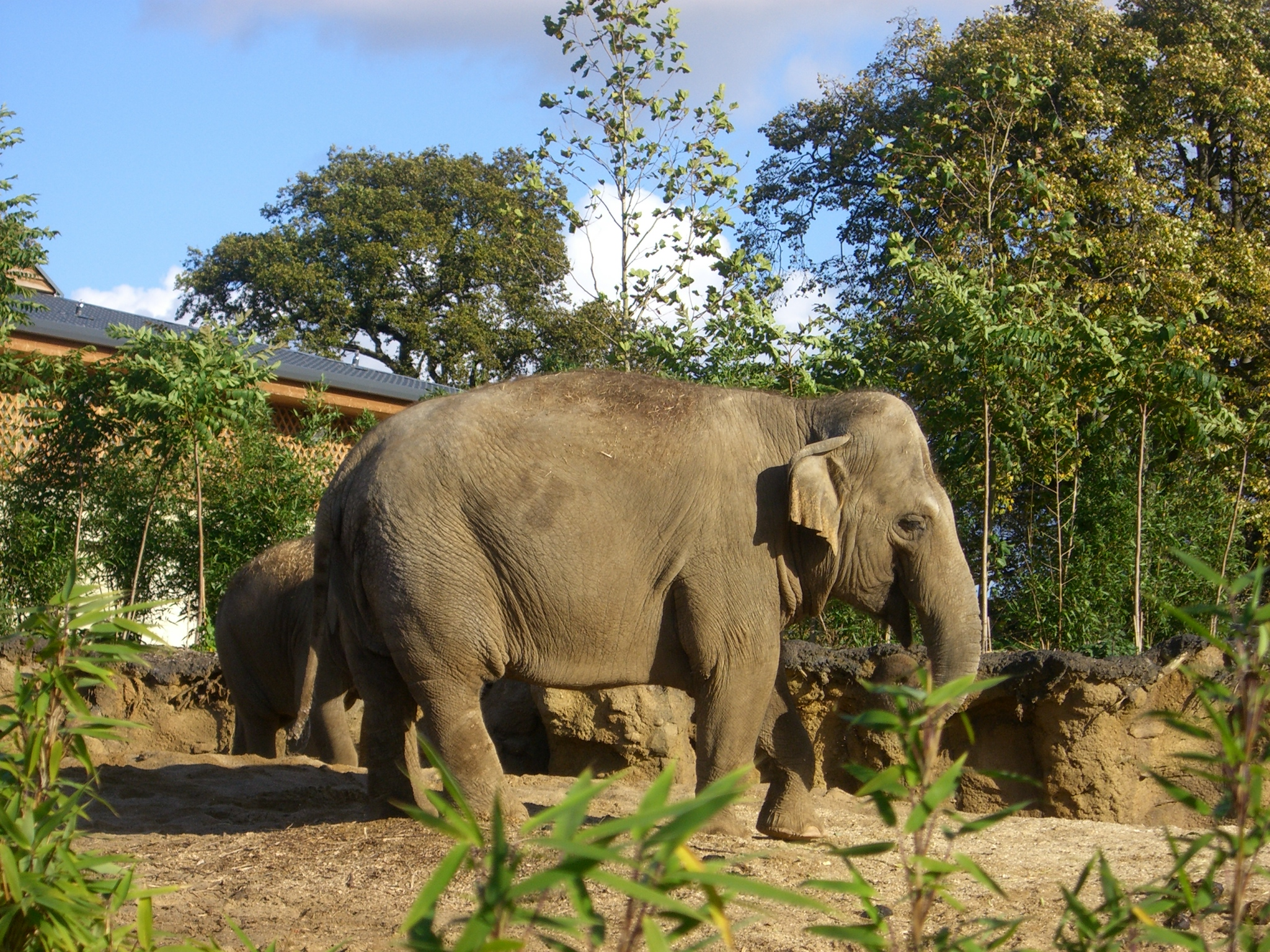
Elephant habitat

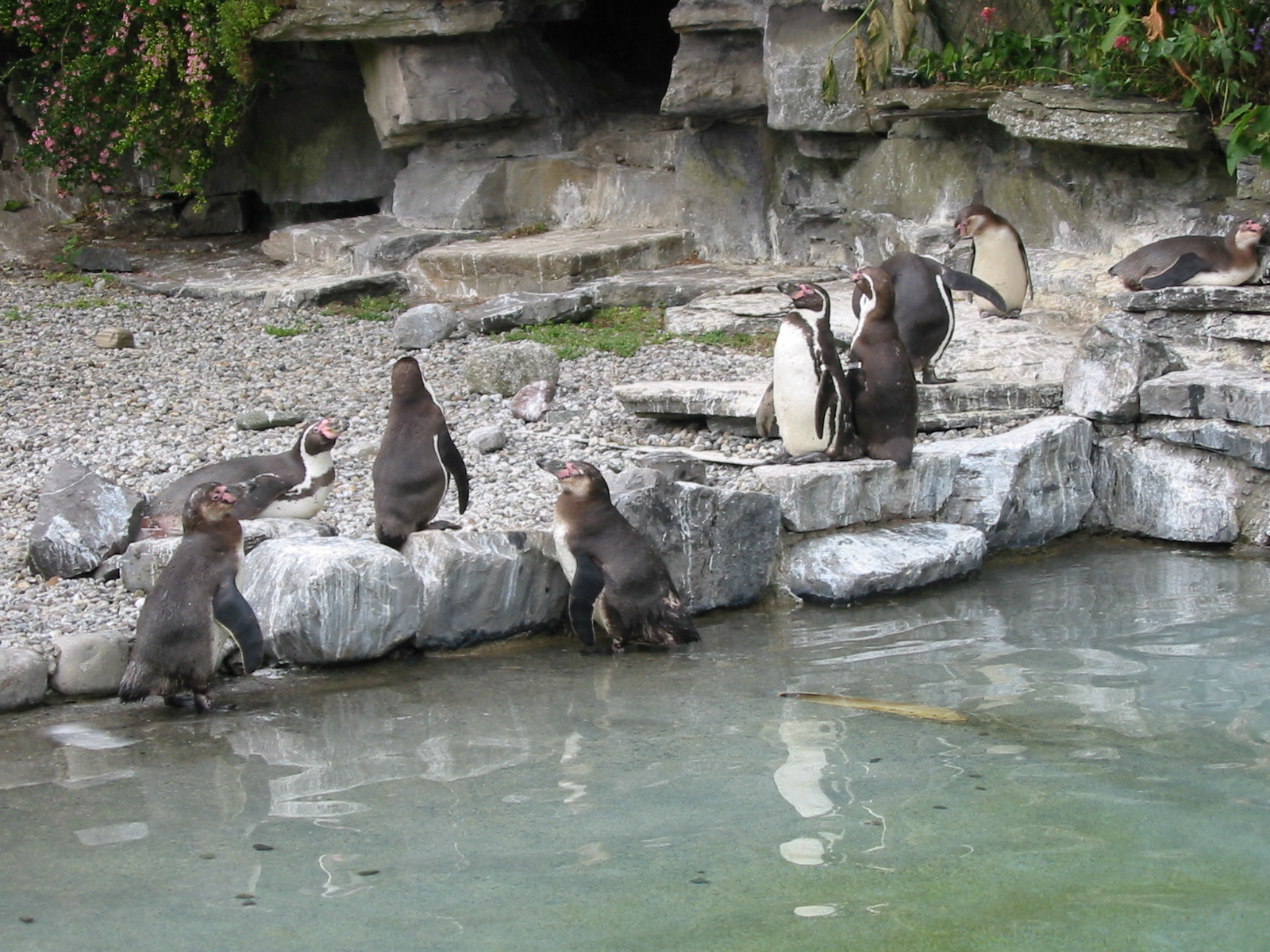
Humboldt penguins (Spheniscus humboldti)

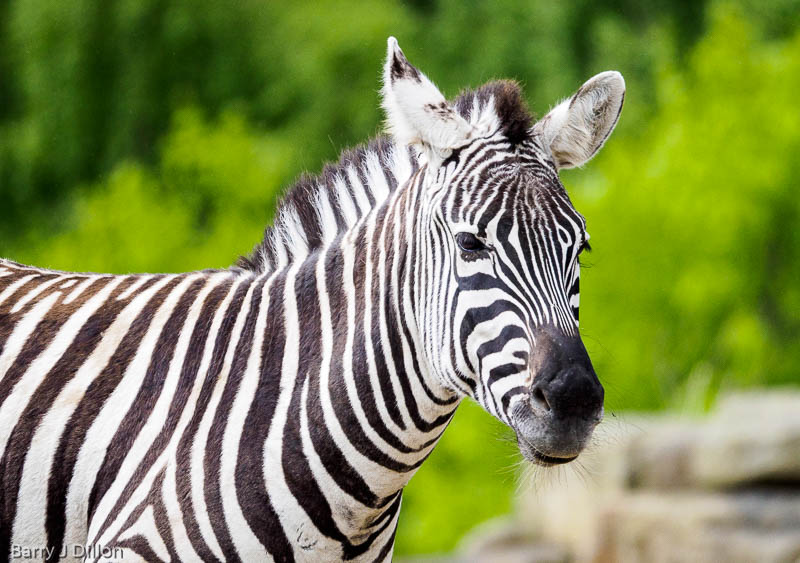
Zebra at the zoo

Peacock with feathers displayed

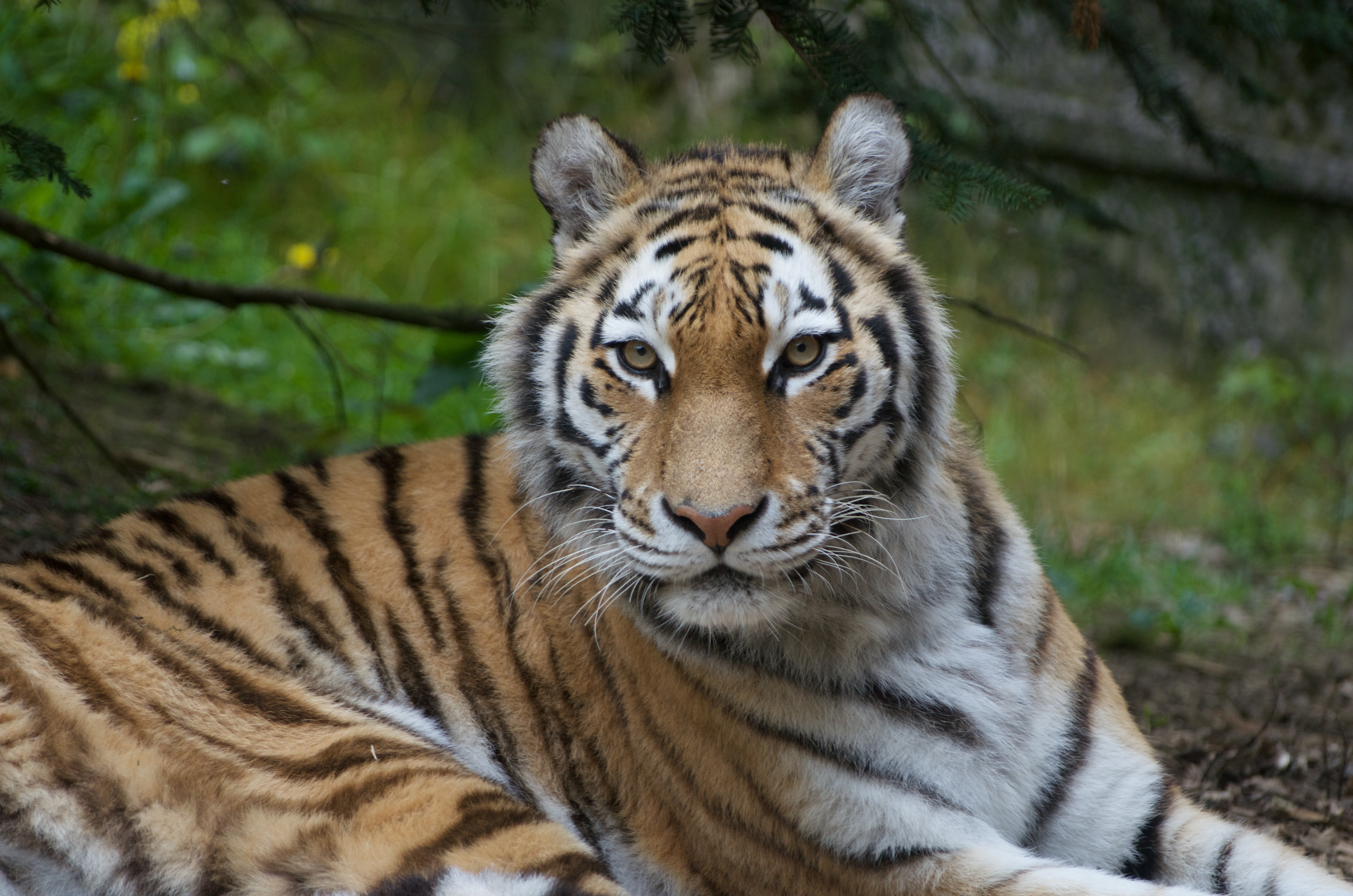
Tiger

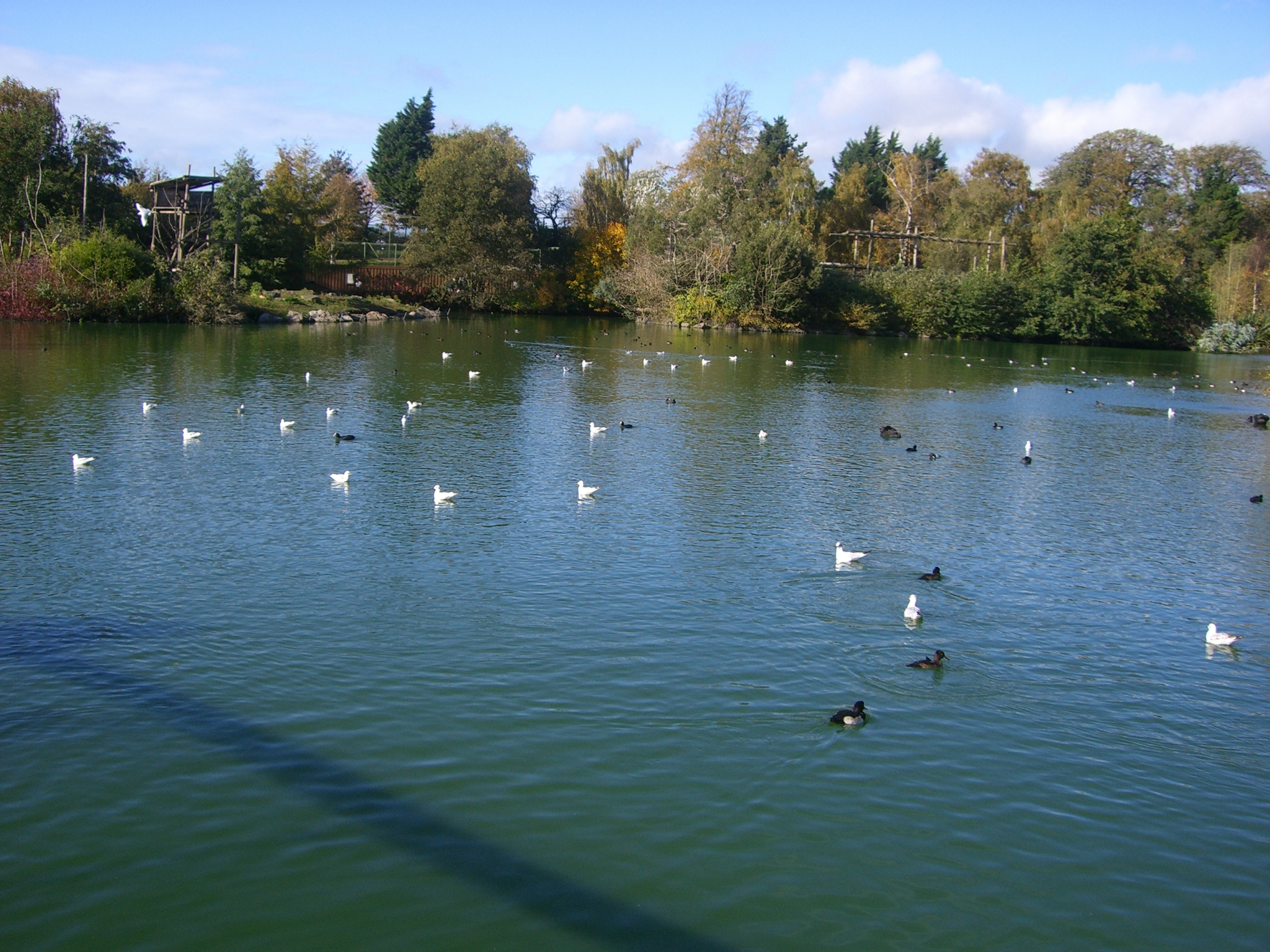
Birds on one of the many ponds at the zoo

== See also ==
- Natural History Museum (Ireland)
