= Cream tea =

English afternoon snack

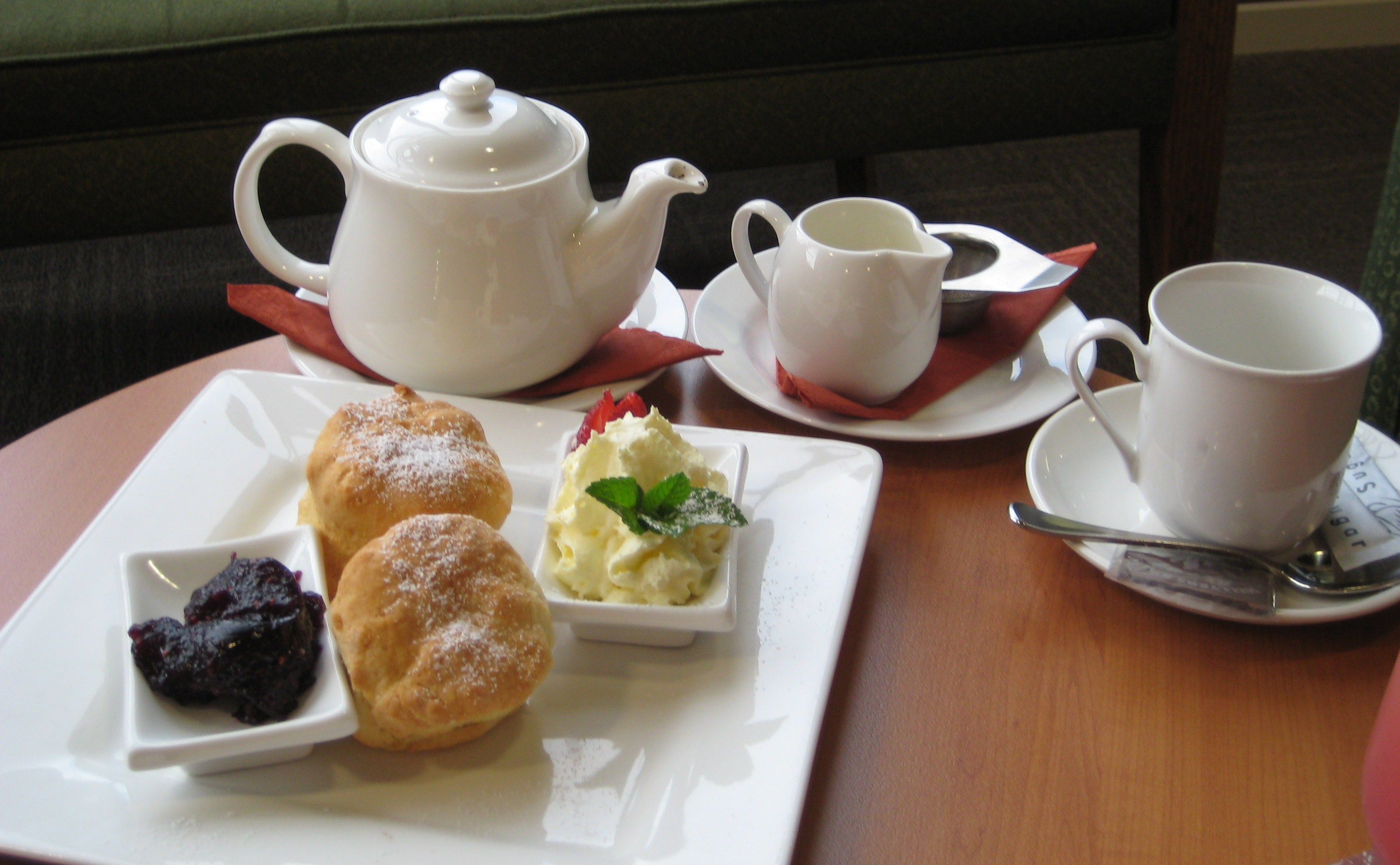
- A cream tea from Devon, comprising tea taken with scones, clotted cream and jam.
- Alternative names: Devonshire tea, Cornish cream tea
- Place of origin: England
- Region or state: South West England
- Serving temperature: Tea: hot Scones: warm Jam & cream: ambient
- Main ingredients: Tea, scones, clotted cream, strawberry jam
- Variations: Multiple
- Food energy (per serving): High

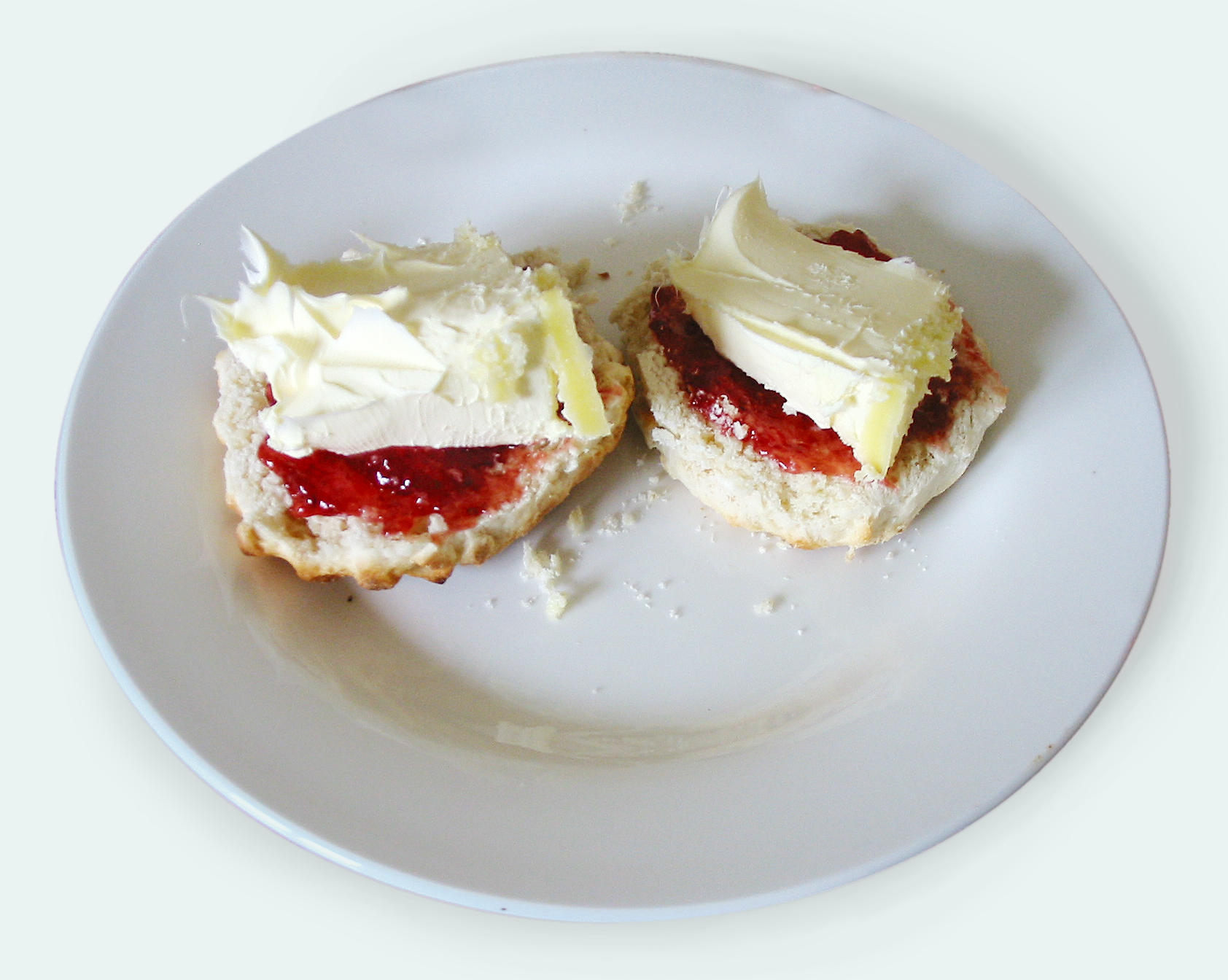
An example of scones prepared according to the "Cornwall method".

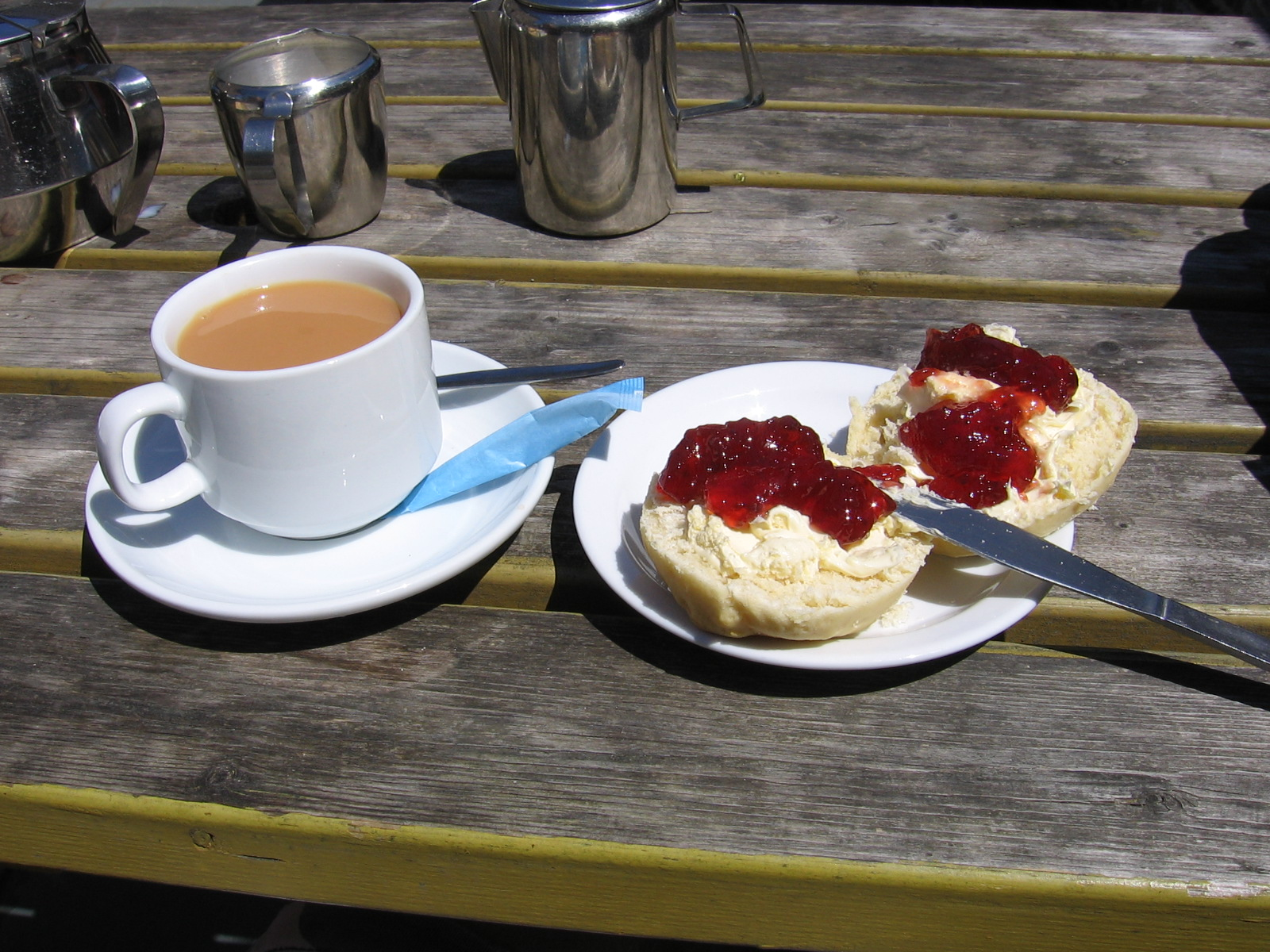
A cream tea prepared according to the "Devon method".

A cream tea (also known as a Devon cream tea, Devonshire tea, or Cornish cream tea) is an afternoon tea consisting of tea, scones, clotted cream (or, less authentically, whipped cream), jam, and sometimes butter. Cream teas are sold in tea rooms throughout England, especially Devon and Cornwall, and in some other parts of the Commonwealth.

== History ==
The origin of the cream tea is disputed, although there is evidence to suggest that the tradition of eating bread with cream and jam existed at Tavistock Abbey in Devon in the 11th century. The Oxford English Dictionary reports the earliest use of "cream tea" in the sense of the afternoon tea, as opposed to a cup of tea with cream in it, is in the 1964 novel Picture of Millie by Philip Maitland Hubbard, "We just bathe and moon about and eat cream teas." However, the "Foods of England" website has discovered an earlier newspaper cutting, The Cornishman of Thursday, 3 September 1931 (p. 8), which uses the phrase in what appears to be its modern sense: "For an alleged Cornish cream tea consisting of three slices of bread and butter, a splashing of cream and jam and two anaemic rolls, I was charged 1s. 6d." (equivalent to £4 in 2025).)

== Variations ==
There are regional variations as to how a cream tea should preferably be eaten.

- The Devonian, or Devonshire, method is to split the scone in two, cover each half with clotted cream, and then add strawberry jam on top.
- With the Cornish method, the warm 'split' or a 'scone' is first split in two, then spread with strawberry jam, and finally topped with a spoonful of clotted cream.

Although these distinctions on whether to apply the jam or the clotted cream to the scone first are still claimed by many, cream teas are served and enjoyed both cream first and jam first throughout both counties.

Scones are rarely buttered in commercially available teas. Traditionally it is important that the scones be warm (ideally, freshly baked), and that clotted (rather than whipped) cream and strawberry jam, rather than any other variety, be used. Butter is generally not included, and some sources advise that the tea should not be served with milk.

In Cornwall an alternative was traditionally a "split", a type of slightly sweet white bread roll, rather than a scone. It is now rare to find this available commercially, even in Cornwall, but splits are still used by many Cornish families in their own homes. In Devon, an alternative to the scone found occasionally is the "Devon split" or "Chudleigh", lighter than a scone and smaller than a Cornish split.

Another variation to a cream tea is called "Thunder and Lightning", which consists of a round of bread or a Cornish split, topped with clotted cream and honey or golden syrup.

Yet another variation is a "savoury cream tea", with cheese scones; cream cheese instead of clotted cream, and chutney instead of jam.

== Attempted protected status ==
In May 2010, a campaign was launched at the Devon County Show to have the name "Devon cream tea" protected within the European Union under Protected Designation of Origin (PDO) rules. The campaign was launched following discussion on BBC Radio Devon.

== See also ==
- Afternoon tea
- Tea party
- Tea sandwich
- Cuisine of Devon
- Cornish cuisine
