= Devon Closewool =

British breed of sheep

- Conservation status: FAO (2007): not at risk; DAD-IS (2021): at risk; RBST (2021–2022): at risk
- Country of origin: United Kingdom
- Distribution: North Devon

Traits
- Weight: Male: 80–100 kg; Female: 55–62 kg
- Wool colour: white
- Face colour: white
- Horn status: naturally polled

The Devon Closewool is a British breed of domestic sheep. It is distributed almost exclusively on Exmoor in North Devon, in south-west England. It is raised primarily for meat.

== History ==
The Devon Closewool was developed in the second half of the nineteenth century by cross-breeding native Exmoor ewes with Devon Longwool rams. The oldest known flock dates from 1894. A breed society – the Devon Closewool Sheep Breeders' Society – was formed in 1923, and a flock-book was started in the same year. By 1950 there were close to 230 000 head. In 2009 total breed numbers were estimated to be 5 000. Of these, about 95% were distributed within an area in North Devon some 100 km across, coinciding approximately with the extent of Exmoor; about 75% are within 20 km of the mean centre of distribution.

== Characteristics ==
The Devon Closewool is of medium size, ewes weighing up to about 62 kg and rams up to 100 kg. It is solidly built, with strong legs. It is naturally polled in both sexes, white-woolled and white-faced, with black nostrils and short ears. The fleece is dense and of medium length and staple. It is a hardy grassland breed, well suited to grazing on the grasslands and heaths of the uplands of its area of distribution.

== Use ==
The Devon Closewool is reared for meat and for wool.

On lowland grass, lambs may be ready for slaughter at between twelve and sixteen weeks, when they yield a dressed carcase weight of about 18–21 kg; on upland grazing they may take up to twenty-four weeks to reach the same weights. Ewes have good maternal qualities, and a lambing percentage of some 150–160%. Ewes may be put to rams of a terminal breed such as the Suffolk or Texel to produce cross-bred lambs; these grow fast and quickly reach slaughter weight. Ewes may also be put to ram of a breed such as the Blue-faced Leicester to produce more prolific cross-bred "mule" ewes; this is however uncommon.

Ewe fleeces weigh some 3–4 kg, those of rams 5–6 kg. The wool is dense and of medium length; staple length is 100–150 mm, fibre diameter is approximately 35 μm. It is used for carpets or for tweeds and hosiery.
