= Clotted cream =

Thick cream made by heating milk

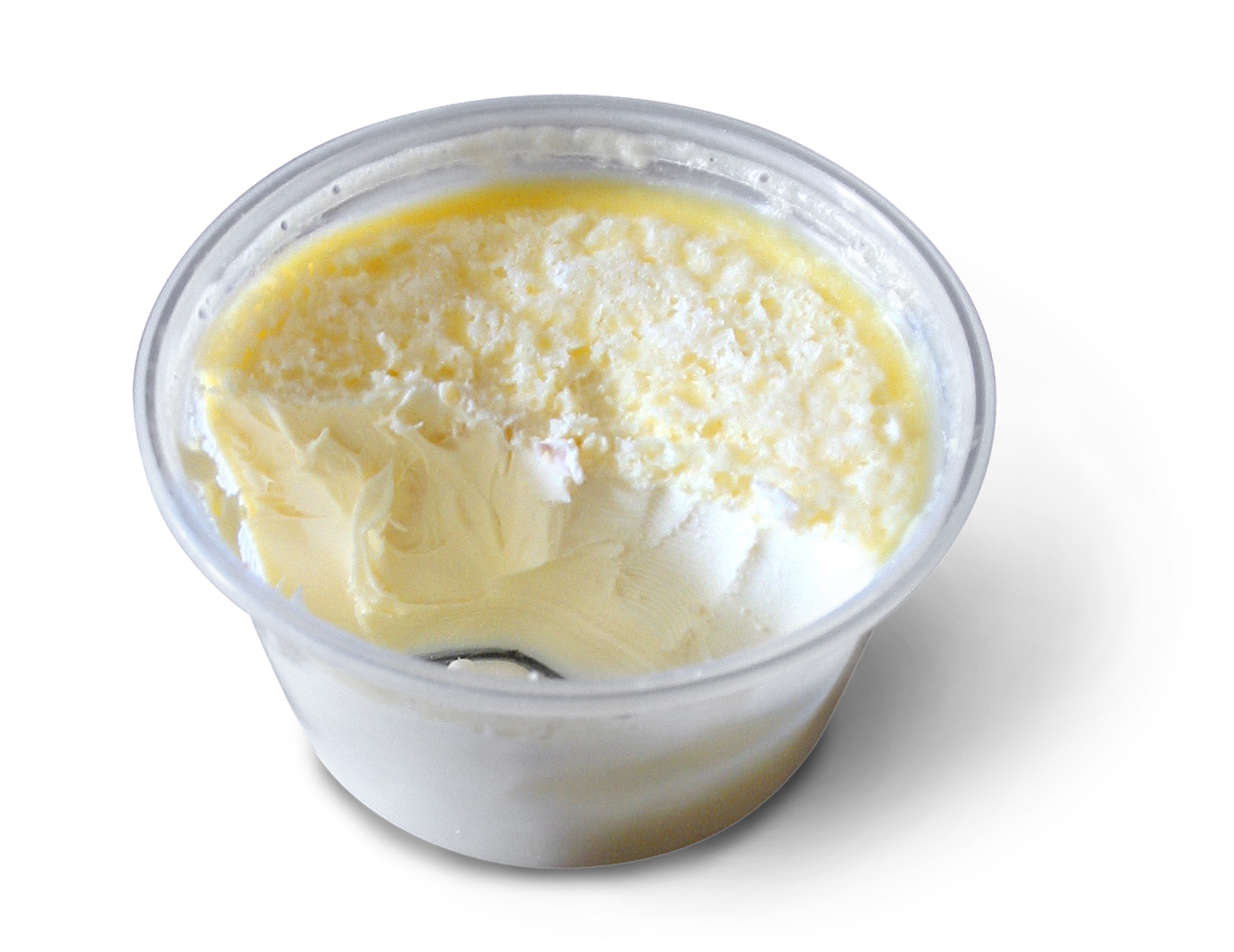
- A tub of clotted cream, showing top crust
- Alternative names: Clouted cream, Devonshire cream, Cornish cream
- Place of origin: England
- Region or state: Devon, Cornwall

Clotted cream (Cornish: dehen molys, sometimes called scalded, clouted, Devonshire or Cornish cream) is a thick cream made by heating full-cream cow's milk using steam or a water bath and then leaving it in shallow pans to cool slowly. During this time, the cream content rises to the surface and forms "clots" or "clouts", hence the name. Clotted cream is an essential ingredient for cream tea.

Although its origin is uncertain, the cream is associated with dairy farms in South West England and in particular the counties of Devon and Cornwall. The largest commercial producer in the United Kingdom is Rodda's at Scorrier, near Redruth, Cornwall, which can produce up to 25 tons of clotted cream a day.

In 1998 "Cornish clotted cream" was registered as a Protected Designation of Origin (PDO) under European Union law. The designation can be used if the production follows certain requirements, the milk is produced in Cornwall and the cream has a minimum fat content of 55%. Following Brexit, the PDO was also registered under UK law. It is recognised as a geographical indication in Georgia, Iceland, Moldova, Montenegro, Norway, Serbia, Switzerland and Ukraine.

== Description ==
"Its orient tinge, like spring-time morn,
Or baby-buttercups newly-born;
Its balmy perfume, delicate pulp,
One longs to swallow it all at a gulp,
Sure man had ne'er such gifts or theme
As your melt-in-mouthy Devonshire cream."

— "An eulogy on a can of cream sent from a lady in Exeter". (extract)
—William Barry Peacock, Manchester, 1853

Clotted cream has been described as having a "nutty, cooked milk" flavour, and a "rich sweet flavour" with a texture that is grainy, sometimes with oily globules on the crusted surface. It is a thick cream, with a very high fat content (a minimum of 55%, but an average of 64%). For comparison, the fat content of single cream is only 18%.

According to the UK Food Standards Agency, clotted cream provides 586 kilocalories (2,450 kJ) per 100 grams (3.5 oz).

== History ==
Originally made by farmers to reduce the amount of waste from their milk, clotted cream has become so deep-rooted in the culture of southwest Britain that it is embedded as part of the region's tourist attractions. While there is no doubt of its strong and long association with Cornwall and Devon, it is not clear how ancient its origins are.

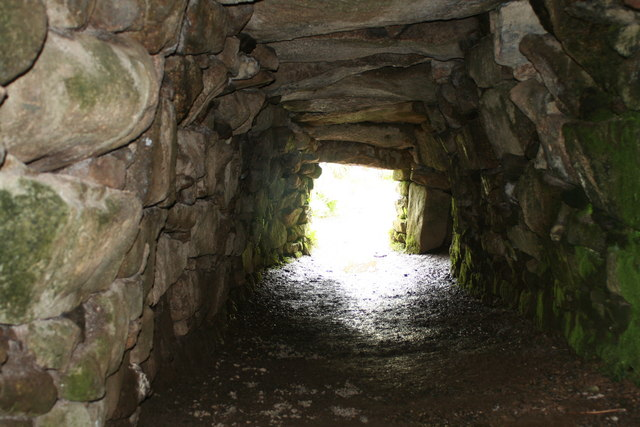
A Roman-era Cornish fogou or souterrain

The Oxford Companion to Food follows traditional folklore by suggesting it may have been introduced to Cornwall by Phoenician traders in search of tin. It is similar to kaymak (or kajmak), a Near Eastern delicacy that is made throughout the Middle East, southeast Europe, Iran, Afghanistan, India, and Turkey. A similar clotted cream known as urum (өрөм) is also made in Mongolia.

Contemporary ancient food experts, noting Strabo's commentaries on Britain, (Note: "They live off their herds ... As they have mines of tin and lead, they give these metals and hides from their cattle to the sea traders ... instead of olive oil they use butter.") have proposed that the early Britons would have probably clotted their cream to preserve its freshness.

In the 21st century, regional archaeologists have associated the stone fogou (dial. 'fuggy-hole'), or souterrains, found across Atlantic Britain, France and Ireland as a possible form of "cold store" for dairy production of milk, cream, and cheese in particular. Similar functions are ascribed to the linhay (or 'linney') stone-built form, often used as a dairy in later medieval longhouses in the same regions.

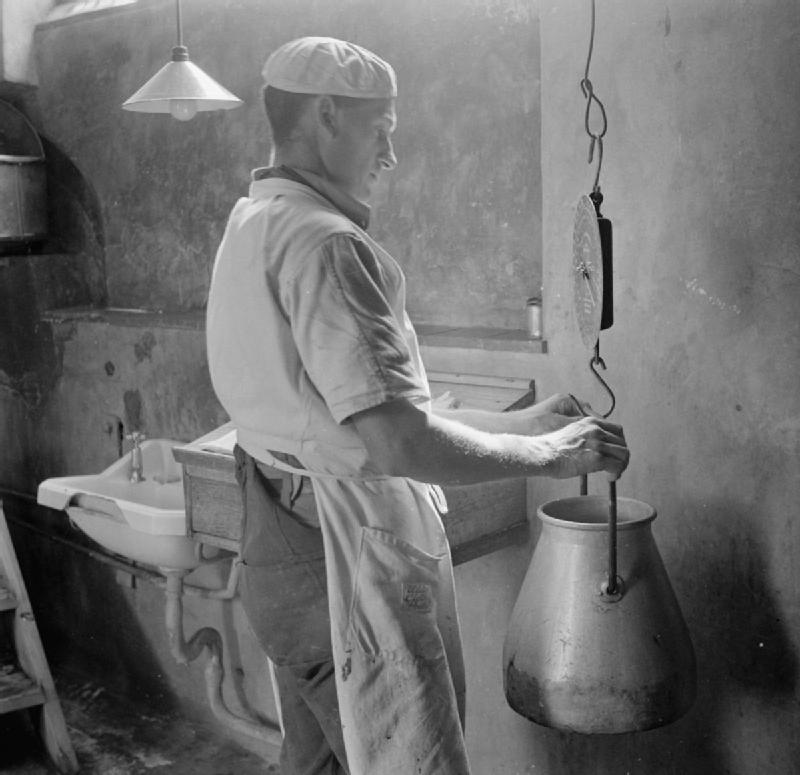
A 'Cow Man' weighs milk at Dartington, 1942.

It has long been disputed whether clotted cream originated in Devon or Cornwall, and which county makes it best. There is evidence that the monks of Tavistock Abbey were making clotted cream in the early 14th century. After their abbey had been ransacked by Vikings in AD 997, the monks rebuilt it with the help of Ordulf, Earl of Devon. In a BBC report, local historians claimed local workers were drafted in to help with the repairs, and the monks rewarded them with bread, clotted cream, and strawberry preserves. The 1658 cookery book The Compleat Cook had a recipe for "clouted cream".

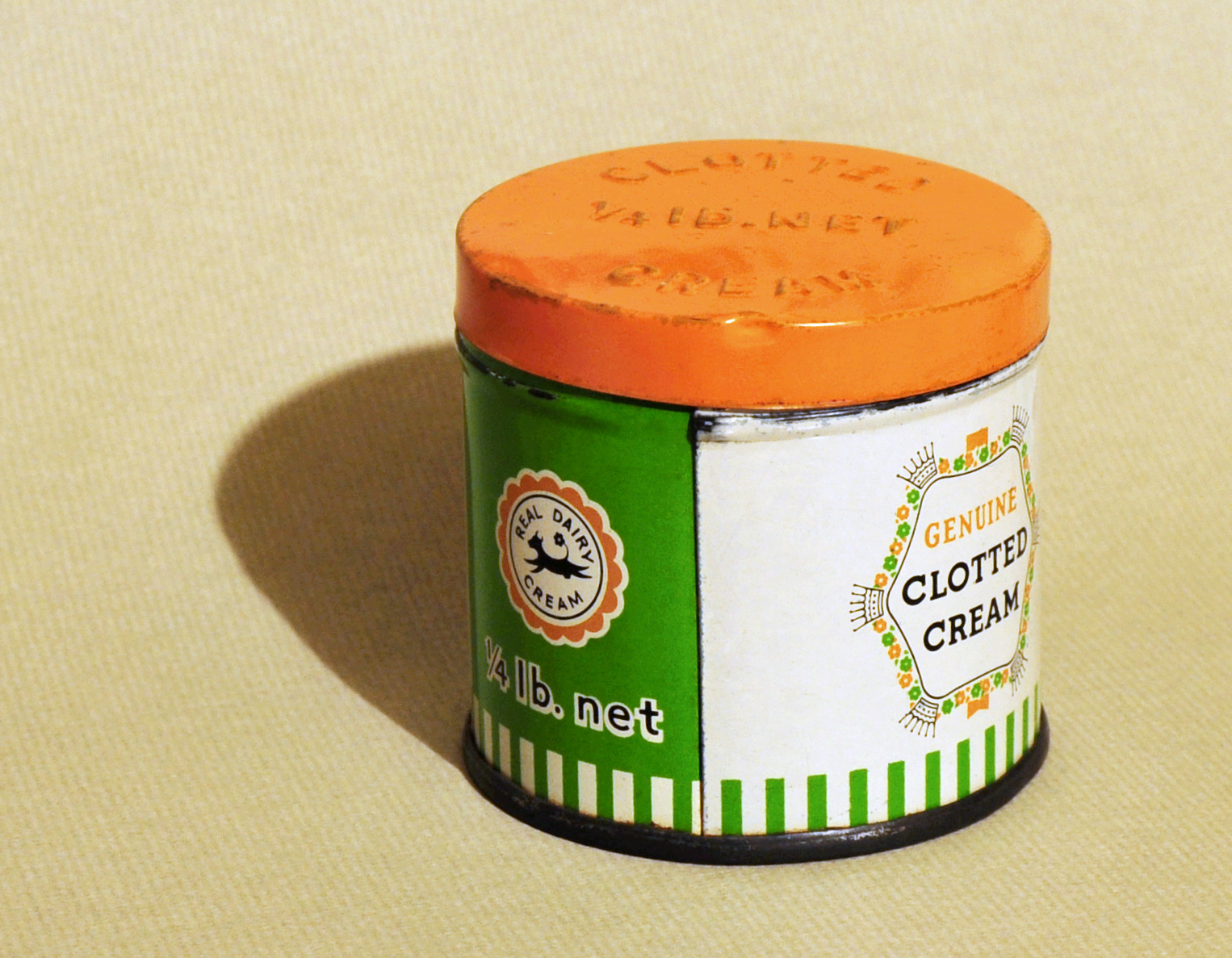
A tin that was used in the 1970s to send clotted cream through the post from Devon

In the 19th century it was regarded as better nourishment than "raw" cream because that cream was liable to go sour and be difficult to digest, causing illness. An article from 1853 calculates that creating clotted cream will produce 25 per cent more cream than regular methods. In Devon it was so common that in the mid-19th century it was used in the formative processes of butter, instead of churning cream or milk. The butter made in this way had a longer lifespan and was free from any negative flavours added by the churning.

It has long been the practice for local residents in southwest England, or those on holiday, to send small tins or tubs of clotted cream by post to friends and relations in other parts of the British Isles.

=== Protected Designation of Origin ===
In 1993 an application was made for the name Cornish clotted cream to have a Protected Designation of Origin (PDO) in the European Union for cream produced by the traditional recipe in Cornwall. This was accepted in 1998. Cornish clotted cream must be made from milk produced in Cornwall and have a minimum butterfat content of 55 per cent. The unique, slightly yellow Cornish clotted cream colour is due to the high carotene levels in the grass.

== Preparation ==
Traditionally, clotted cream was created by straining fresh cow's milk, letting it stand in a shallow pan in a cool place for several hours to allow the cream to rise to the surface, then heating it either over hot cinders or in a water bath, before a slow cooling. The clots that formed on the top were then skimmed off with a long-handled cream-skimmer, known in Devon as a reamer or raimer. By the mid-1930s the traditional way of using milk brought straight from the dairy was becoming a rarity in Devon because using a cream separator actively separated the cream from the milk using centrifugal force, which produced far more clotted cream than the traditional method from the same amount of milk.

Today, there are two distinct methods for making clotted cream. The "float cream method" includes scalding a floating layer of double cream in milk (skimmed or whole) in shallow trays. To scald, the trays are heated using steam or very hot water. After the mixture has been heated for up to an hour it is slowly cooled for 12 hours or more, before the cream is separated and packaged. The "scald cream method" is similar, but the milk layer is removed and a layer of cream, which has been mechanically separated to a minimum fat level is used. This cream is then heated in a similar manner, but at a lower temperature and after a set amount of time it is then chilled and packaged. In the United Kingdom the resultant cream is deemed to be equivalent to pasteurised for legal purposes. Unlike pasteurisation, however, there is no requirement for the temperatures to be recorded on thermograph charts. As the temperatures are lower than used in standard pasteurisation, much care is needed in ensuring high standards of hygiene.

The largest manufacturer in the United Kingdom is Rodda's, a family-owned business based in Scorrier, Cornwall. Founded in 1890, the company was producing over 1,000,000 pounds (450,000 kg) per year in 1985. In 2010 the managing director said that they might produce as little as 5 long tons (5,100 kg; 11,000 lb) a day in January, but up to 25 long tons (25,000 kg; 56,000 lb) a day as Christmas approached. In the early 1980s Rodda's signed deals with international airlines to serve small tubs of clotted cream with the in-flight desserts. The company considers the annual Wimbledon tennis championships one of their peak selling periods. As a by-product, for every 100 imperial gallons (450 L; 120 US gal) of milk used, 94 imperial gallons (430 L; 113 US gal) of skimmed milk is produced, which is then used in food manufacture.

One Devon manufacturer, Definitely Devon was purchased by Robert Wiseman Dairies in March 2006, closing one of the two Devon dairies and moving all production to Okehampton. However, in 2011 Robert Wiseman sold the Definitely Devon Brand to Rodda's, who moved the production of Definitely Devon to Cornwall, which caused some controversy as the name was not changed, prompting an investigation by Trading Standards.

Throughout southwest England, clotted cream manufacture is a cottage industry, with many farms and dairies producing cream for sale in local outlets. Clotted cream is also produced in Somerset, Dorset, Herefordshire, Pembrokeshire, and the Isle of Wight.

When authentic clotted cream is not available, there are ways to create a substitute product, such as by mixing mascarpone with whipping cream, a little sugar, and vanilla extract.

== Uses ==
=== Cream tea ===
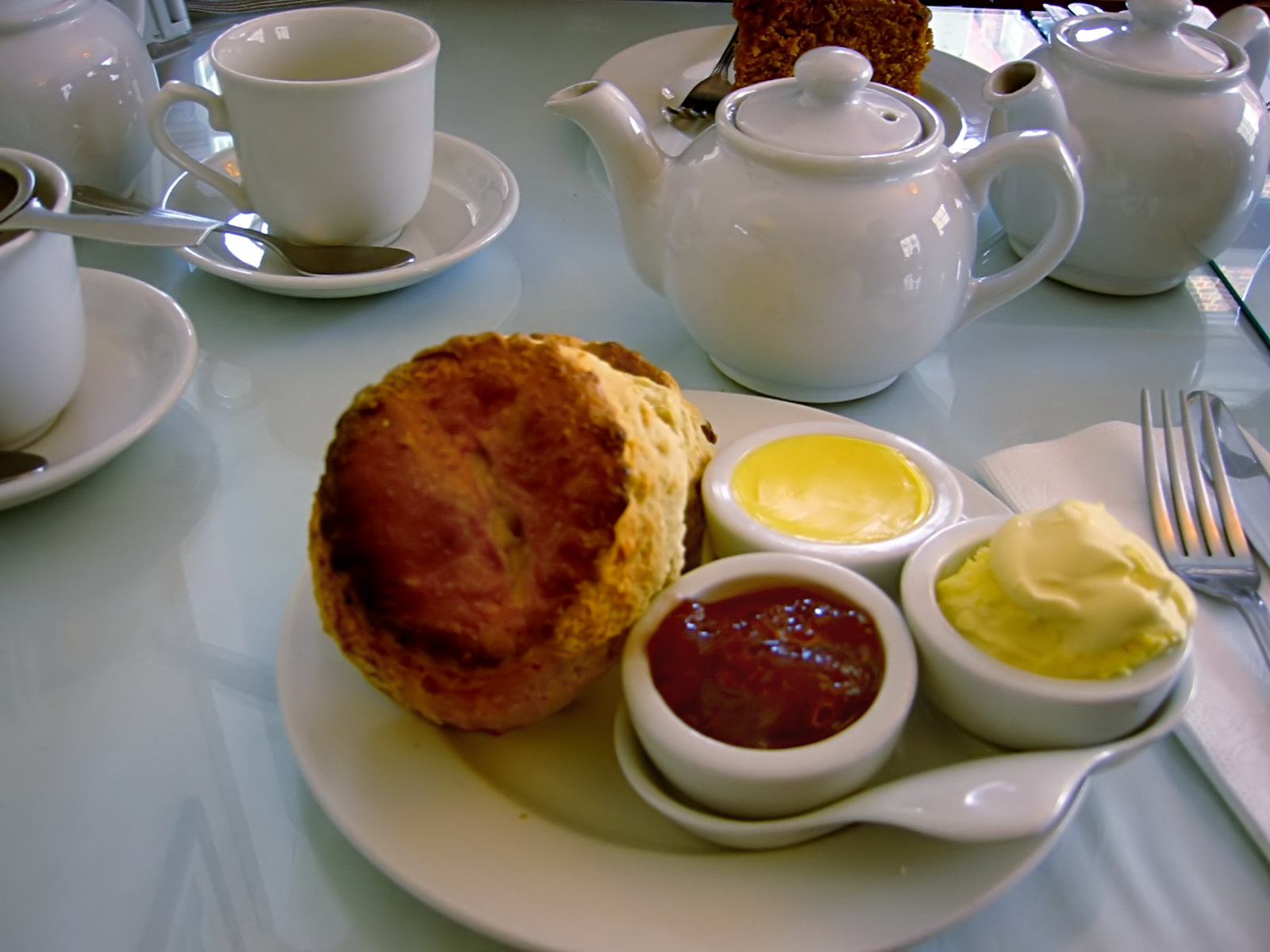
A modern cream tea

Clotted cream is an essential part of a cream tea, a favourite with tourists particularly in Cornwall and Devon. It is served on scones—or the more traditional "splits"—with strawberry jam, along with a pot of tea. Traditionally, there are differences in the way it is eaten in each county: in Devon the cream is traditionally spread first on the scone, with the jam dolloped on top. In Cornwall the jam is spread first with a dollop of cream. Cream teas, known as Devonshire teas, spread to southern Australia as early immigrants from Cornwall and Devon took their traditional recipes with them. In 2010 Langage Farm in Devon started a campaign for "Devon cream tea" to have protected designation of origin similar to "Cornish clotted cream". One variation on a cream tea is called "Thunder and Lightning" which consists of a round of bread topped with clotted cream and golden syrup, honey or treacle.

=== Confectionery ===
Clotted cream can be used as an accompaniment to hot or cold desserts. Clotted cream, especially clotted cream from Devon, where it is less yellow due to lower carotene levels in the grass, is regularly used in baking. It is used throughout southwest England in the production of ice cream and fudge.

=== Savoury dishes ===
Clotted cream is used in some savoury dishes, and can be incorporated into mashed potato, risotto or scrambled eggs.

=== Historical ===
Cabbage cream (which does not contain cabbage despite the name) was a delicacy in the mid-17th century: layers of clotted cream were interspersed with sugar and rosewater, creating a cabbage-like effect when served. It was a common accompaniment to junket, a milk-based dessert that went out of fashion in the mid-20th century.

== Literature and folklore ==
Clotted cream was mentioned in The Shepheardes Calendar, a poem by Edmund Spenser in 1579:

Ne would she scorn the simple shepherd swain,
For she would call him often heam,
And give him curds and clouted cream.

As with many Cornish and Devonian icons, clotted cream has become entrenched in local folklore. For example, one myth tells of Jenny who enticed the giant Blunderbore (sometimes called Moran) by feeding him clotted cream. He eventually fell in love with her and made her his fourth wife. Another myth, from Dartmoor, tells of a princess who wanted to marry an elven prince, but according to tradition had to bathe in pure cream first. A witch who wanted the prince for her daughter kept souring the cream. Eventually, the prince offered the princess clotted cream that the witch was unable to sour.

Clotted cream is also mentioned as one of the staple foods of the hobbits in J.R.R. Tolkien's The Lord of the Rings books.

== See also ==
- Butter
- List of dairy products
- Junket (dessert)
- Clabber (food)
- Malai
- Kaymak
- Mascarpone
- List of spreads
