= Greyface Dartmoor =

Breed of sheep

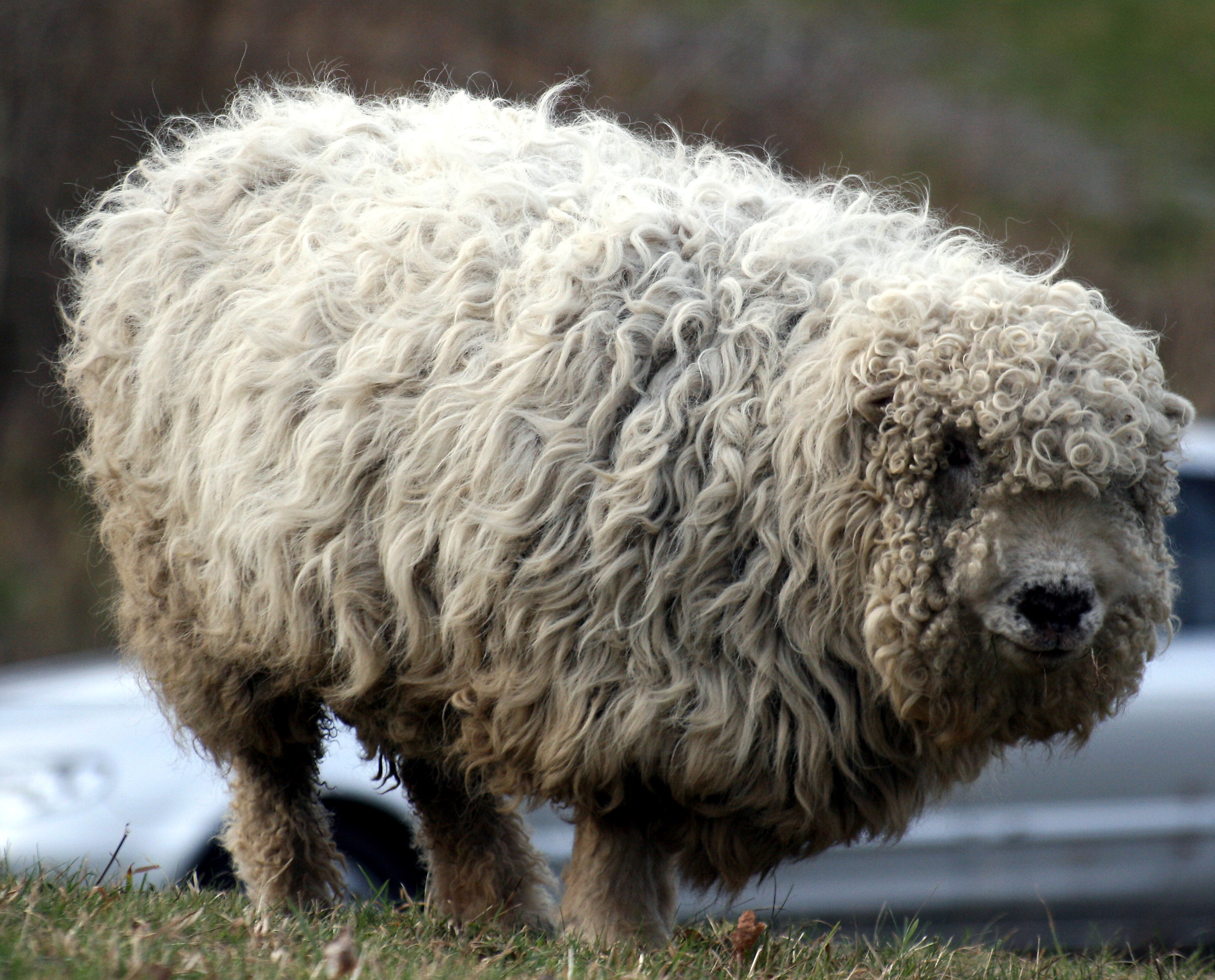
A Greyface Dartmoor

The Greyface Dartmoor is a rare breed of domestic sheep originating around Dartmoor in south west England. Also known as the "Improved Dartmoor", this is a large and long-woolled breed, known for its distinctive facial markings. Its fleece can weigh 7 to 9 kg (15 to 20 lb) (more when from rams), and today the breed is primarily raised for meat.
