= Dairy product =

Food made from milk

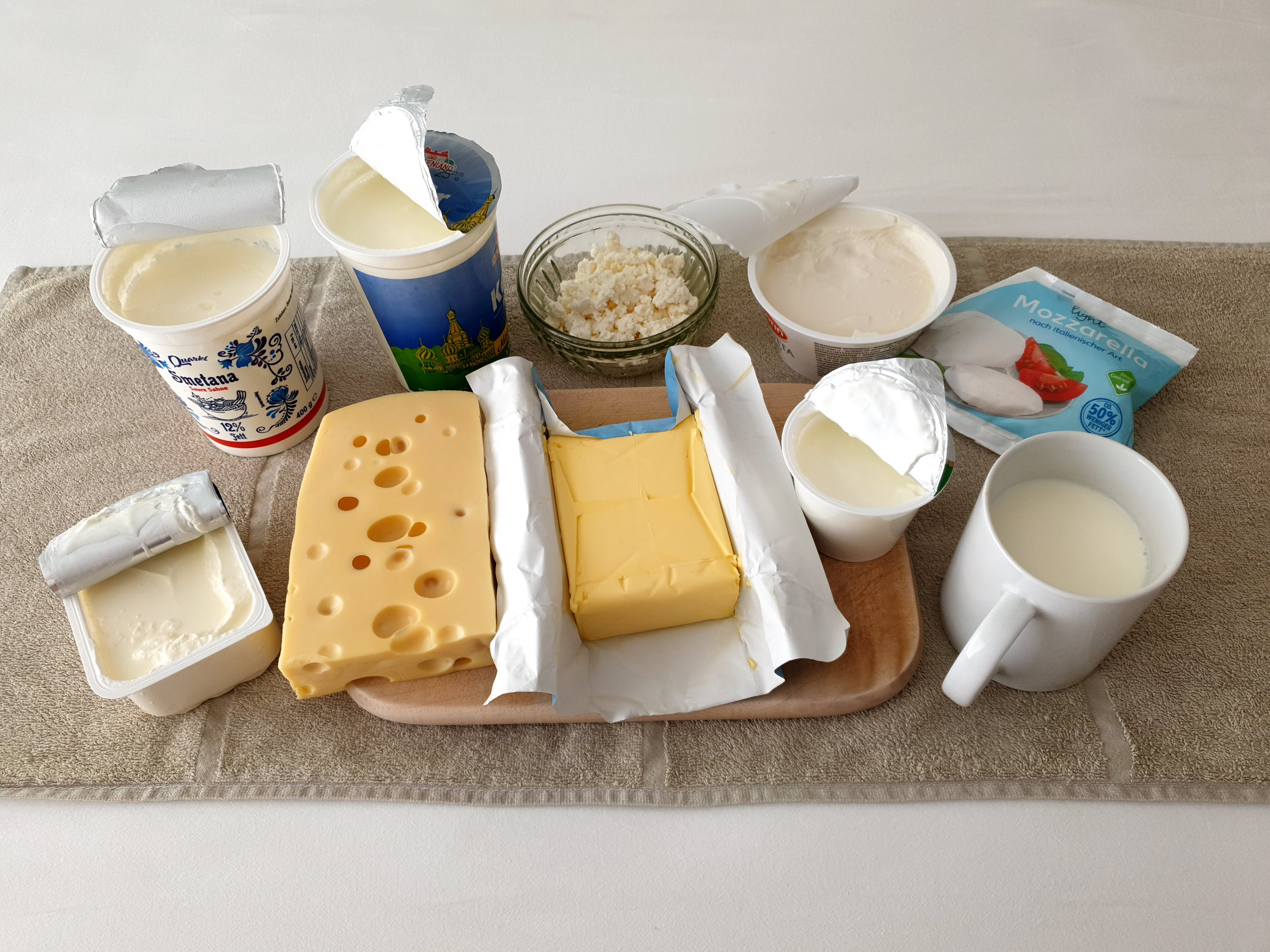
- Dairy products. Back row left to right: smetana, kefir, cottage cheese, ricotta, mozzarella. Front row left to right: quark, cheese, butter, yogurt, milk.

Milk products and production relationships

Dairy products or milk products are foods made from (or containing) milk. (Note: Historically, dairy products were referred to as lacticinia and were known as white meats in Early Modern English.) The most common dairy animals are cattle, water buffalo, goat, and sheep. Dairy products consumed around the world include yogurt, cheese, milk, and butter. A facility that produces dairy products is a dairy. (Note: or dairy factory) Dairy products are consumed worldwide to varying degrees. Some people avoid some or all dairy products because of lactose intolerance, veganism, environmental concerns, or other reasons or beliefs.

== Types of dairy product ==
=== Milk ===
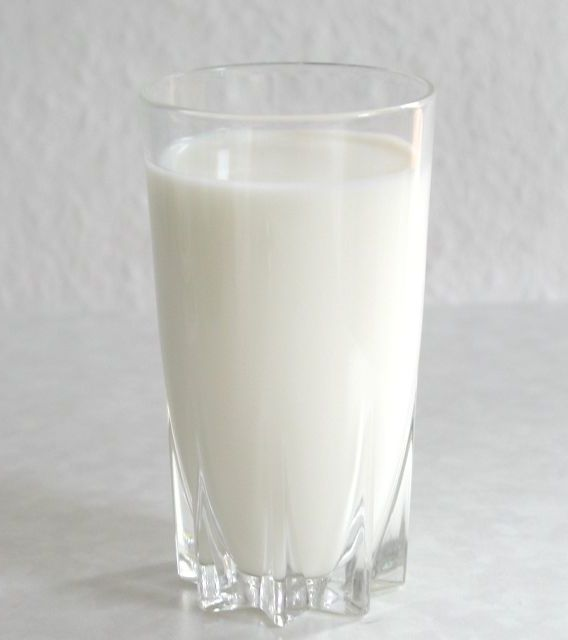
All dairy products derive from milk

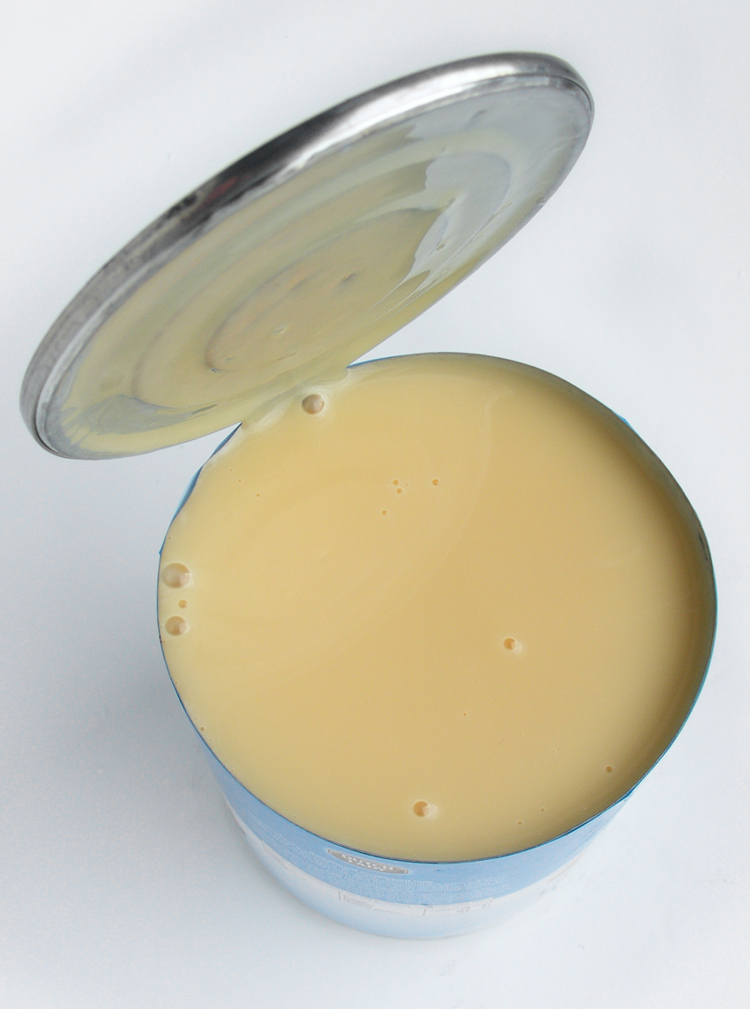
Condensed milk

Milk production includes multiple optional steps, including creaming and homogenization, pasteurization, and the possible addition of the bacteria Streptococcus lactis and Leuconostoc citrovorum.

Milk is sold in several grades of fat content and quality.

Milk products include:

- Scalded milk
- Condensed milk, milk which has been concentrated by evaporation, with sugar added for reduced process time and longer life in an opened can
- Evaporated milk, (less concentrated than condensed) milk without added sugar
- Baked milk is milk simmered on low heat for a long time, which results in mild caramelization. Particularly popular in Eastern Europe.
- Dulce de leche
- Powdered milk (or milk powder), produced by removing the water from (usually skim) milk
- Khoa, milk which has been completely concentrated by evaporation, used in Indian cuisine
- Infant formula, dried milk powder with specific additives for feeding human infants
- High milk-fat and nutritional products (for infant formulas)
- Whey, the liquid drained from curds and used for further processing or as a livestock feed
- Buttermilk, the liquid left over after producing butter from cream, often dried as livestock feed
- Milk skin

Milk is also a key ingredient in many confectioneries. Milk can be added to chocolate to produce milk chocolate.

=== Cream ===
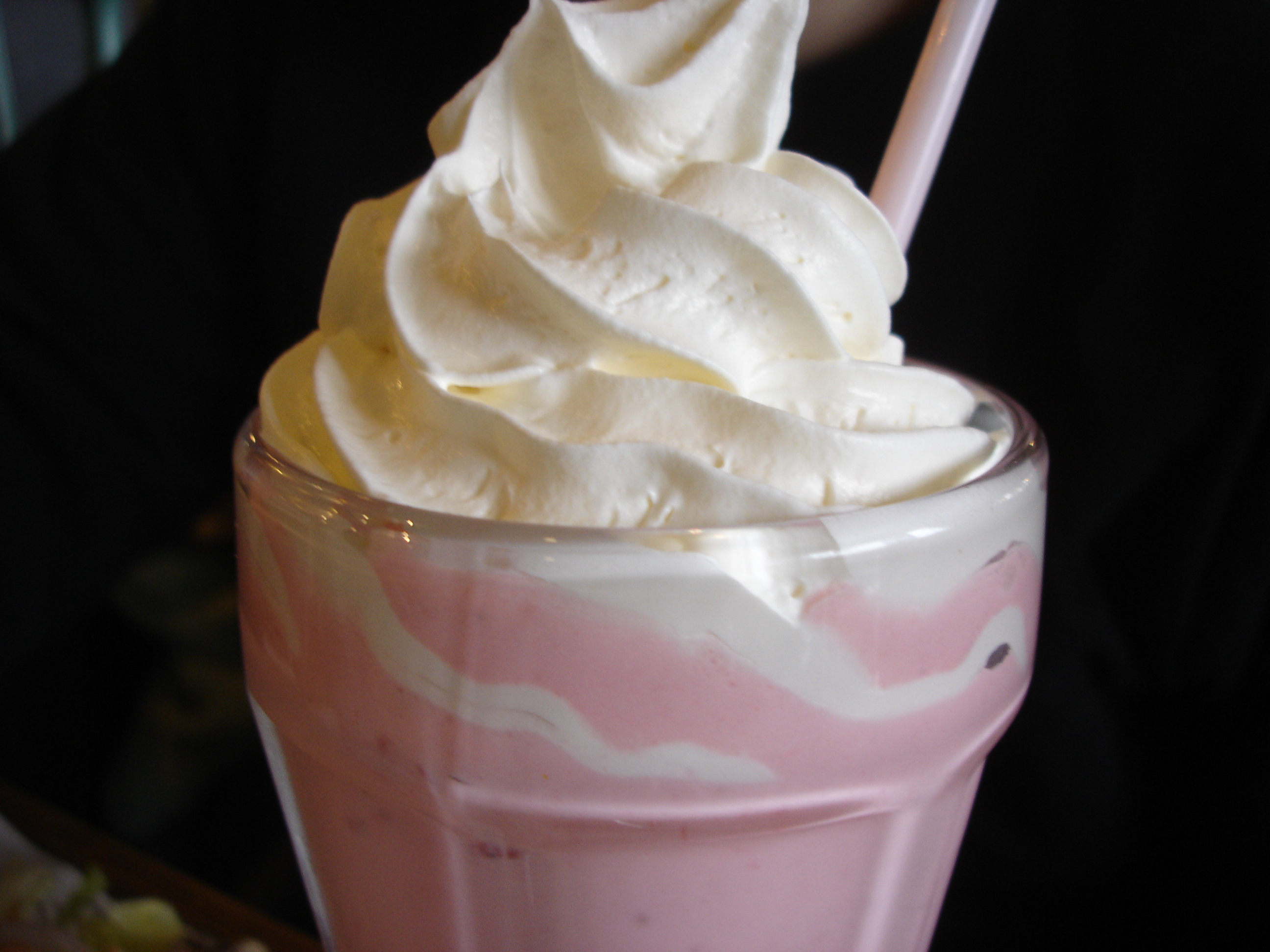
Whipped cream

Cream and fermented cream
- Single cream, double cream and whipped cream
- Clotted cream, thick, spoonable cream made by heating milk
- Malai
- Kaymak
- Sour cream
  - Smetana, Central and Eastern European variety of sour cream
- Crème fraîche, slightly fermented cream

=== Butter ===
Butter is mostly milk fat, produced by churning cream

- Ghee, also called clarified butter is made by gentle heating of butter and removal of the solid matter
  - Smen, a fermented, clarified butter used in Moroccan cooking
  - Anhydrous milkfat (clarified butter)

=== Fermented ===
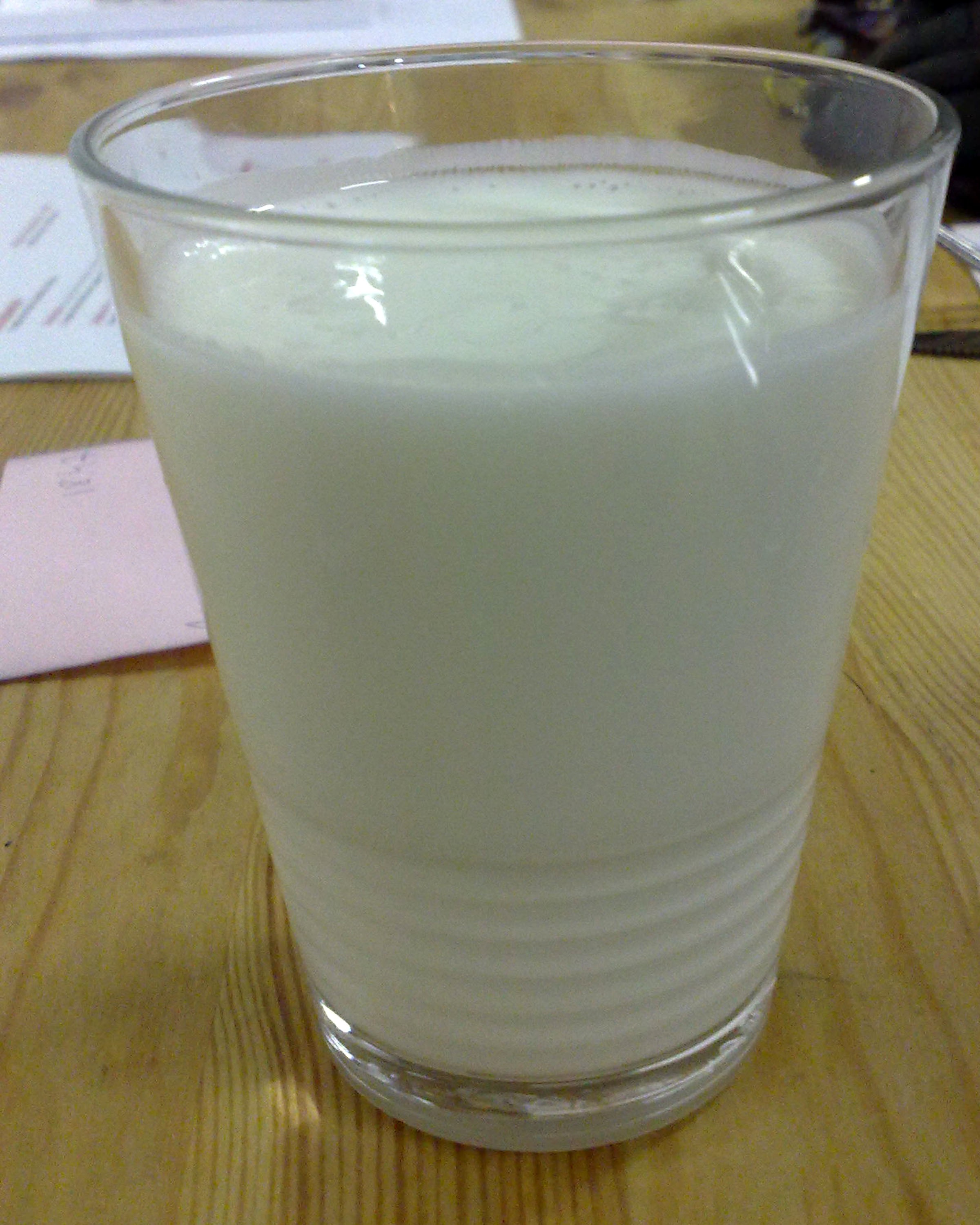
Kefir is a fermented probiotic dairy drink

Fermented milk products include:

- Soured milk obtained by fermentation with mesophilic bacteria, mainly Lactococcus lactis and other bacterial cultures and yeasts
- Soured cream and crème fraîche
- Cultured buttermilk resembling buttermilk, but uses different yeast and bacterial cultures
- Clabber, milk naturally fermented to a yogurt-like state
- Filmjölk
- Ymer
- Viili
- Kefir, fermented milk drink from the Northern Caucasus
- Kumis, fermented mares' milk popular in Central Asia
- Amasi
- Mursik
- Quark

=== Yogurt ===
Yogurt is milk fermented by thermophilic bacteria, mainly Streptococcus salivarius ssp. thermophilus and Lactobacillus delbrueckii ssp. bulgaricus, sometimes with additional bacteria, such as Lactobacillus acidophilus.

- Acidophiline
- Matzoon
- Skyr
- Strained yogurt
- Qatyq
- Ryazhenka
- Varenets
- Ayran
- Doogh
- Lassi, Indian subcontinent
- Leben

=== Cheese ===
Cheese is produced by coagulating milk, separating curds from whey, and letting it ripen, generally with bacteria, and sometimes also with certain molds.

- Rennet-coagulated cheeses
  - Blue cheese
  - Brined cheese
  - Washed-rind cheese
- Acid-set or sour milk cheeses
  - Fresh cheeses and curds, the soft, curdled part of milk (or skim milk) used to make cheese
    - Cuajada
  - Chhena and paneer
  - Cream cheese, produced by the addition of cream to milk and then curdled to form a rich curd or cheese
- Whey cheese is a dairy product made from whey and thus technically not cheese.
  - Heat and acid coagulation
    - Ricotta, acidified whey cheese
    - Manouri, anthotyros, mizithra from Greece.
  - Brown cheese made of boiled-down whey

=== Custard ===
- Custard, thickened with eggs
- Imitation custard, thickened with starch

=== Frozen ===
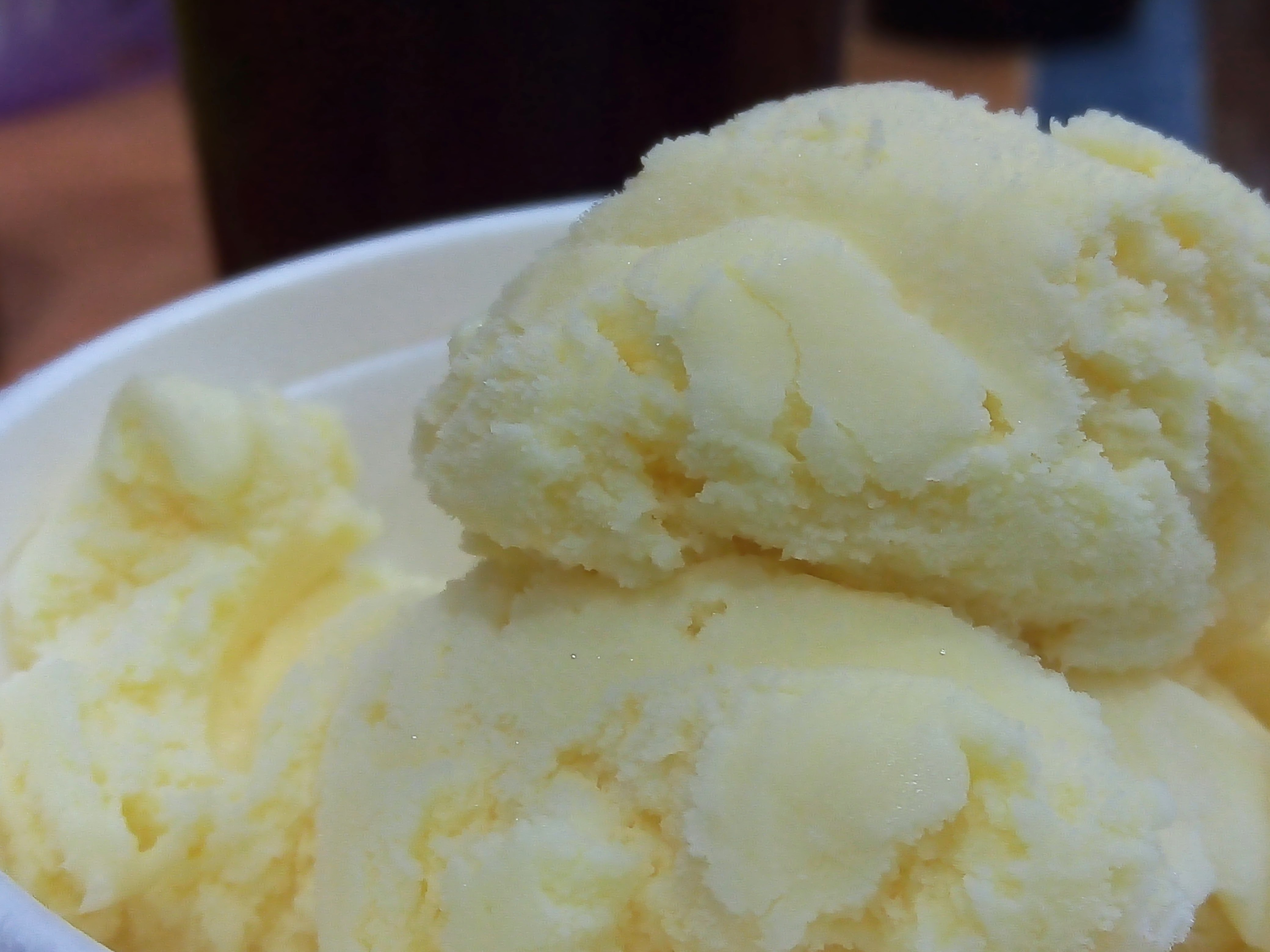
Ice cream

- Ice cream, slowly frozen cream, milk, flavors and emulsifying additives (dairy ice cream)
- Gelato, slowly frozen milk and water, lesser fat than ice cream
- Ice milk, low-fat version of ice cream
- Frozen custard
- Frozen yogurt, yogurt with emulsifiers

=== Casein ===
- Casein, milk proteins
- Caseinates, sodium or calcium salts of casein
- Milk protein concentrates and isolates
- Whey protein concentrates and isolates, reduced lactose whey
- Hydrolysates, milk treated with proteolytic enzymes to alter functionality
- Mineral concentrates, byproduct of demineralizing whey

== History of dairy products ==
While cattle were domesticated as early as 12,000 years ago as a food source and as beasts of burden, the earliest evidence of using domesticated cows for dairy production is from the seventh millennium BC – the early Neolithic era – in northwestern Anatolia. Dairy farming developed elsewhere in the world in subsequent centuries: the sixth millennium BC in eastern Europe, the fifth millennium BC in Africa, and the fourth millennium BC in Britain and Northern Europe.

In the last century or so larger farms specialising in dairy alone have emerged. Large scale dairy farming is only viable where either a large amount of milk is required for production of more durable dairy products such as cheese, butter, etc. or there is a substantial market of people with money to buy milk, but no cows of their own. In the 1800s, economist Johann Heinrich von Thünen argued that there was about a 100-mile radius surrounding a city where such fresh milk supply was economically viable.

Cool temperature has been the main method by which milk freshness has been extended. When windmills and well pumps were invented, one of their first uses on the farm, besides providing water for animals themselves, was for cooling milk, to extend its storage life, until it would be transported to the town market. The naturally cold underground water would be continuously pumped into a cooling tub or vat. Tall, ten-gallon metal containers filled with freshly obtained milk, which is naturally warm, were placed in this cooling bath. This method of milk cooling was popular before the arrival of electricity and refrigeration.

Harold McGee writes that, for thousands of years, "the making of cheese, yogurt, and other fermented products was largely uncontrolled, with microbes from the air or left over from the previous batch, whether desirable or not, colonizing the milk.... By the turn of the [twentieth] century, purified bacterial cultures were being used to control the quality of cheese more closely."

== Consumption patterns worldwide ==
Rates of dairy consumption vary widely worldwide. High-consumption countries consume more than 150 kilograms (330 lb) per capita per year. These countries are: Argentina, Armenia, Australia, Costa Rica, most European countries, Israel, Kyrgyzstan, Canada, the United States and Pakistan. Medium-consumption countries consume 30 kilograms (66 lb) to 150 kg per capita per year. These countries are: India, Iran, Japan, Kenya, Mexico, Mongolia, New Zealand, North and Southern Africa, most of the Middle East, and most of Latin America and the Caribbean. Low-consumption countries consume under 30 kg per capita per year. These countries are: Senegal, most of Central Africa, and most of East and Southeast Asia.

== Lactose levels ==
For those with some degree of lactose intolerance, considering the amount of lactose in dairy products can be important to health.

| Dairy product | Amount of lactose |
|---|---|
| Milk | Highest |
| Butter | Minimal (made from milk fat) |
| Hard cheese | Very low |
| Soft cheese | More than hard cheese |

== Intolerance and health research ==
Dairy products may upset the digestive system in individuals with lactose intolerance or a milk allergy. People who experience lactose intolerance usually avoid milk and other lactose-containing dairy products, which may cause mild side effects, such as abdominal pain, bloating, diarrhea, gas, and nausea. Such individuals may use non-dairy milk substitutes.

=== Cancer ===
There is no scientific evidence that consuming dairy products causes cancer. The British Dietetic Association have described the idea that milk promotes hormone related cancerous tumour growth as a myth, stating "no link between dairy containing diets and risk of cancer or promoting cancer growth as a result of hormones". In 2024, Cancer Research UK stated "there is no reliable evidence that casein or hormones in dairy causes cancer in people". The American Cancer Society (ACS) does not make specific recommendations on dairy food consumption for cancer prevention. Higher-quality research is needed to characterise valid associations between dairy consumption and risk of and/or cancer-related mortality.

A 2023 review found no association between consumption of dairy products and breast cancer. Other recent reviews have found that low-fat dairy intake is associated with a decreased risk of breast cancer.

==== Colorectal cancer ====
The American Institute for Cancer Research (AICR), World Cancer Research Fund International (WCRF), Cancer Council Australia (CCA) and Cancer Research UK have stated that there is strong evidence that consumption of dairy products decreases risk of colorectal cancer. A 2021 umbrella review found strong evidence that consumption of dairy products decreases risk of colorectal cancer. Fermented dairy is associated with significantly decreased bladder cancer and colorectal cancer risk. A scoping review for Nordic Nutrition Recommendations 2023 found a reduced risk of colorectal cancer from dairy intake.

==== Prostate cancer ====
The AICR, WCRF, CCA and Prostate Cancer UK have stated that there is limited but suggestive evidence that dairy products increase risk of prostate cancer. Cancer Research UK have stated that "research has not proven that milk or dairy increases the risk of prostate cancer" and that high-quality research is needed.

It has been suggested that consumption of insulin-like growth factor 1 (IGF-1) in dairy products could increase cancer risk, particularly prostate cancer. However, a 2018 review by the Committee on Carcinogenicity of Chemicals in Food, Consumer Products and the Environment (COC) concluded that there is "insufficient evidence to draw any firm conclusions as to whether exposure to dietary IGF-1 is associated with an increased incidence of cancer in consumers". The COC also stated it is unlikely that there would be absorption of intact IGF-1 from food by most consumers.

=== Cardiovascular disease ===
The American Medical Association (AMA) recommends that people replace full-fat dairy products with nonfat and low-fat dairy products. In 2017, the AMA stated that there is no high-quality clinical evidence that cheese consumption lowers the risk of cardiovascular disease. In 2021, they stated that "taken together, replacing full-fat dairy products with nonfat and low-fat dairy products and other sources of unsaturated fat shifts the composition of dietary patterns toward higher unsaturated to saturated fat ratios that are associated with better cardiovascular health".

In 2017, the National Heart Foundation of New Zealand published an umbrella review which found an "overall neutral effect of dairy on cardiovascular risk for the general population". Their position paper stated that "the evidence overall suggests dairy products can be included in a heart-healthy eating pattern and choosing reduced-fat dairy over full-fat dairy reduces risk for some, but not all, cardiovascular risk factors".

In 2019 the National Heart Foundation of Australia published a position statement on full fat dairy products, "Based on current evidence, there is not enough evidence to recommend full fat over reduced fat products or reduced fat over full fat products for the general population. For people with elevated cholesterol and those with existing coronary heart disease, reduced fat products are recommended." The position statement also noted that the "evidence for milk, yoghurt and cheese does not extend to butter, cream, ice-cream and dairy-based desserts; these products should be avoided in a heart healthy eating pattern".

Recent reviews of randomized controlled trials have found that dairy intake from cheese, milk and yogurt does not have detrimental effects on markers of cardiometabolic health. A 2025 global analysis found that that total dairy consumption is associated with a 3.7% reduced risk of cardiovascular disease and a 6% reduced risk of stroke.

=== Other ===
Consumption of dairy products such as low-fat and whole milk have been associated with an increased acne risk, however, as of 2022 there is no conclusive evidence. Fermented and low-fat dairy products are associated with a decreased risk of diabetes. Consumption of dairy products are also associated with a decreased risk of gout.

A 2023 review found that higher intake of dairy products is significantly associated with a lower risk of inflammatory bowel disease. A 2025 review found that dairy product intake is associated with a lower incidence of tinnitus. A 2025 scoping review of systematic reviews found that dairy consumption is not associated with an increased risk of non-communicable diseases or mortality and may reduce the risk of several health outcomes.

Several reviews in 2026 found that higher consumption of cow's milk and total dairy is associated with an increased risk of Parkinson's disease.

== Animal rights ==
Dairy production in factory farms has been criticized by animal welfare activists. Concern is raised about the frequency of dairy cattle pregnancy, that calves are separated from their mothers, housing, slaughter of calves and pregnant dairy cows, and environment impact.

In most modern dairy production systems, newborn calves are separated from their mothers within a few hours to a day after birth, leaving more milk for sale. In conventional practice, calves receive maternal colostrum for the first hours of life, after which they are typically raised separately and fed milk replacement, a formulated substitute for whole milk produced by the cow.

The practice of early cow–calf separation is a major animal welfare concern among animal rights groups and segments of the public due to cattle's social nature and strong maternal bonds. Studies have shown that separation practices can cause acute behavioural distress responses in both cows and calves, including vocalization and increased activity, and interrupt normal maternal behaviours.

== Avoidance on principle ==
Some groups avoid dairy products for non-health-related reasons. Some religions restrict or do not allow the consumption of dairy products. For example, some scholars of Jainism advocate not consuming any dairy products because dairy is perceived to involve violence against cows. Orthodox Judaism requires that meat and dairy products not be served at the same meal, served or cooked in the same utensils, or stored together, as prescribed in Deuteronomy 14:21.

Veganism is the avoidance of all animal products, including dairy products, most often due to the ethics regarding how dairy products are produced. The ethical reasons for avoiding meat and dairy products include how dairy is produced, how the animals are handled, and the environmental effect of dairy production.

Growing awareness of dairy products' environmental impact, specifically greenhouse gas emissions, has led to many people reducing or avoiding dairy. In the EU, dairy is responsible for 27% of all diet related emissions, on average, while plant-based milks cause 2.5–4.5 times fewer emissions. According to a report of the United Nations' Food and Agriculture Organization in 2010 the dairy sector accounted for 4 percent of global human-made greenhouse gas emissions.

== See also ==
- List of dairy products
- List of dairy product companies in the United States
- Dairy industry in the United States
- Dairy industry in the United Kingdom
- Swiss cheeses and dairy products
