= Souring =

Food technique, exposure to acid

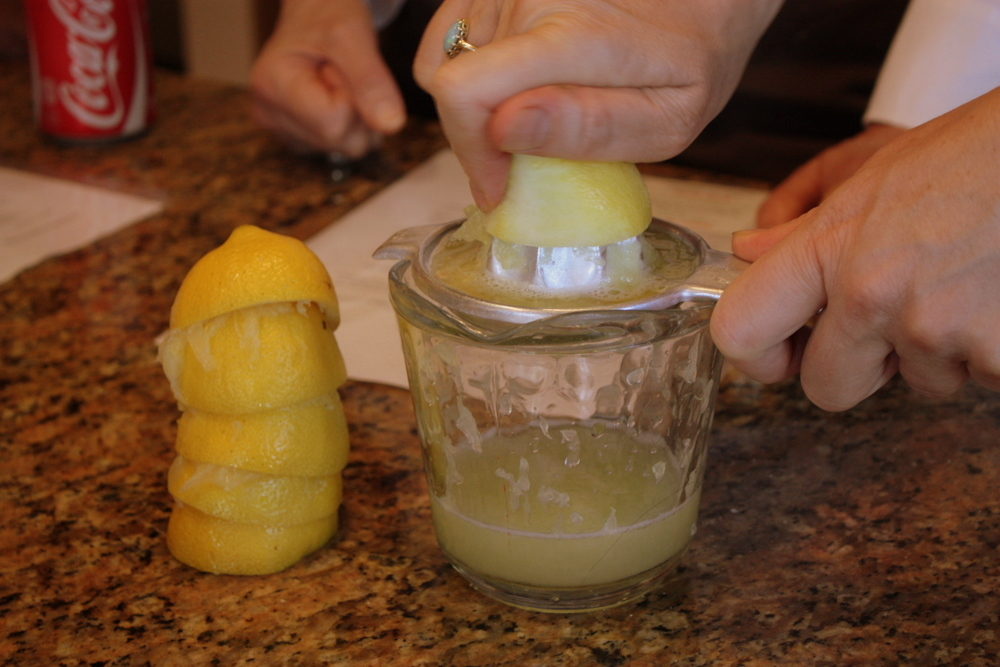
Lemon juice is a natural fruit-based acid.

Souring is a food preparation technique that causes a physical and chemical change in food by exposing it to an acid. This acid can be added explicitly (e.g., vinegar, lemon juice, lime juice, etc.), or can be produced within the food itself by a microbe, such as Lactobacillus.

Souring is similar to pickling or fermentation, but souring typically occurs in minutes or hours, while pickling and fermentation can take a much longer time.

== Examples ==
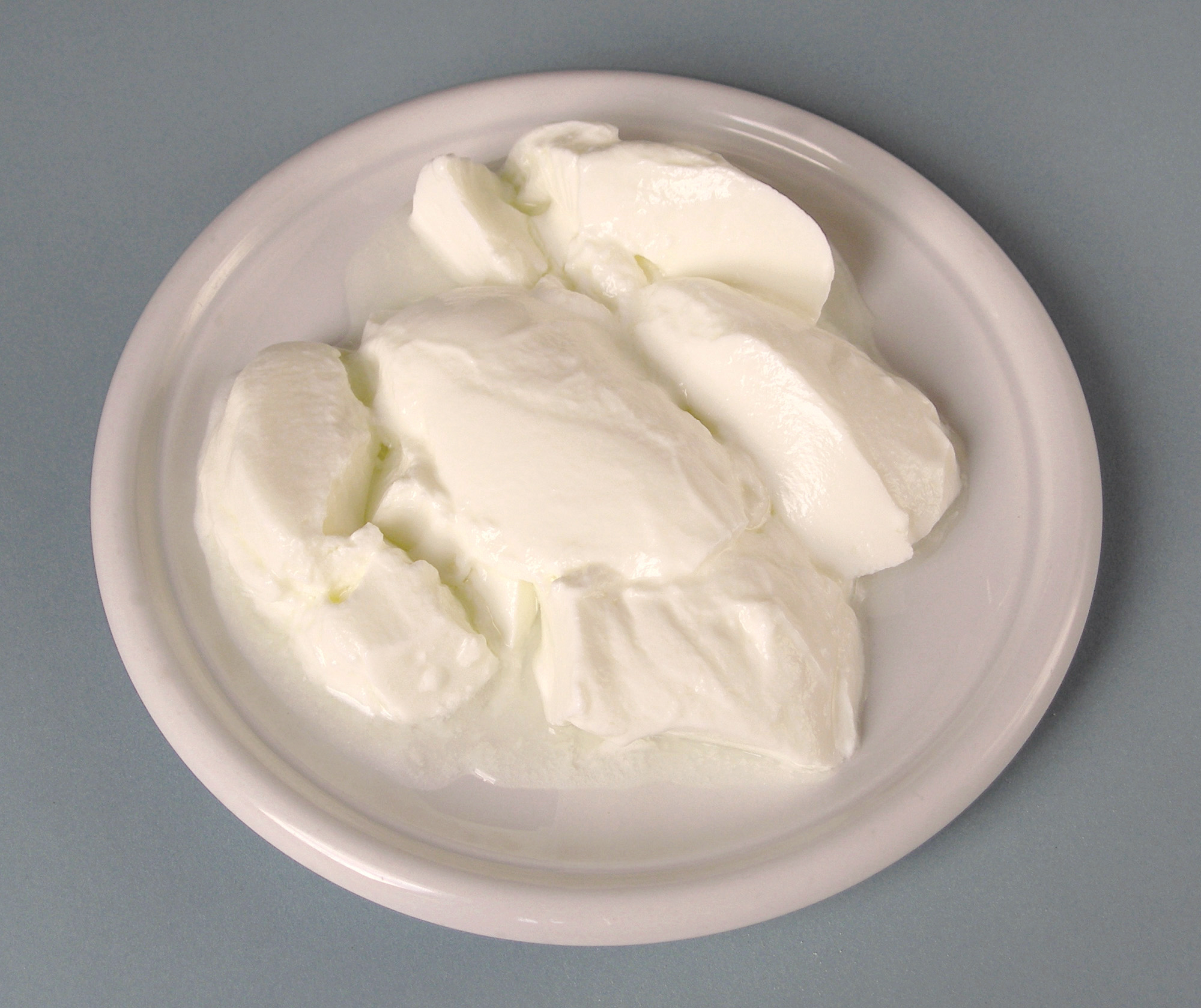
Turkish yoghurt

Dairy products produced by souring include: clabber, cheese, crème fraîche, cultured buttermilk, curd, filmjölk, kefir, paneer, smetana, soured milk, sour cream, and yogurt.

Grain products include: idli, sourdough, and sour mash.

Others foods produced by souring include: ceviche, kinilaw, and key lime pie.

== See also ==
- Fermented milk products
- Food preservation
- Marination
