= Jocoque =

Mexican dairy product

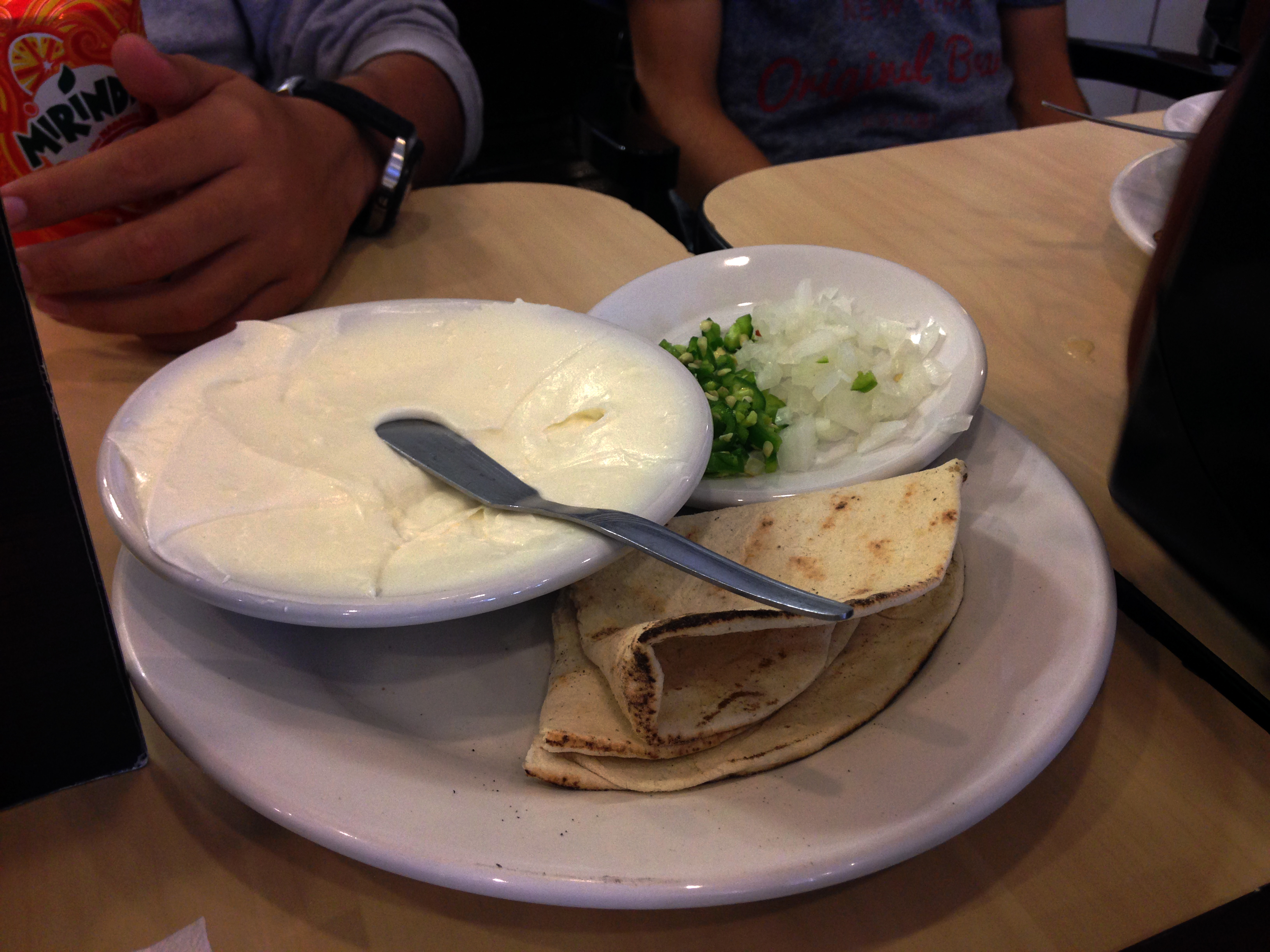
Jocoque

Jocoque or jocoqui is a Mexican dairy product based on fermented milk, of uncertain origins, influenced by Lebanese cuisine.

== Characteristics ==
Jocoque is a food produced from a milk base which, in its most artisanal form, is obtained by leaving milk in a clay vessel near a heat source, such as a chimney, stove or fire, which would give it a different consistency, since it would spontaneously undergo a type of curdling. However, currently its production calls for the use of pasteurized milk, which is injected with a mix of dairy cultures, which cause the milk to be curdled by producing lactic acid, causing a separation of curds through filtration to increase the consistency. It is white in appearance and some authors classify it as a type of queso fresco. It is produced in notable quantities in the state of Sinaloa as well as in parts of the state of Jalisco, mostly in Los Altos de Jalisco, Oaxaca and the center of Mexico. The dry or dehydrated variety of jocoque (called jocoque seco) has increased in popularity across the country in recent years, used as a snack with tostadas or tortilla chips. This "dry jocoque" is similar to the Arab labneh.

In some cities it is made and mixed with other ingredients such as chiles, onions, carrots, cucumbers, etc.

It is described as a type of white yogurt cheese made with sheep, cow, or occasionally goat milk. It has a consistency between yogurt and cheese, and sometimes it can have a doughy texture. With the aim of preserving it longer, it can be left to dry in balls of 3-4 centimeters in diameter which are marinated in a preserve with plenty of olive oil. Jocoque can be seasoned with spices such as thyme, dill or mint.

== See also ==
- Buttermilk
- Quark (cheese)
- Soured milk
- Strained yogurt
