= Acidified milk =

Acidified milk or acidulated milk is the food produced by adding one or more food-grade acids to milk, cream, or buttermilk, with or without the addition of microorganisms. In the United States, acids used to manufacture acidified milk include acetic acid (commonly found in vinegar), adipic acid, citric acid (commonly found in lemon juice), fumaric acid, glucono-delta-lactone, hydrochloric acid, lactic acid (commonly found in fermented milk), malic acid, phosphoric acid, succinic acid, and tartaric acid. Acidified milk lacks certain nutritional benefits that fermented milk has.

== Examples ==
- Acidified infant formula
- Acidified sour cream
- Chhena
