= List of fermented milk products =

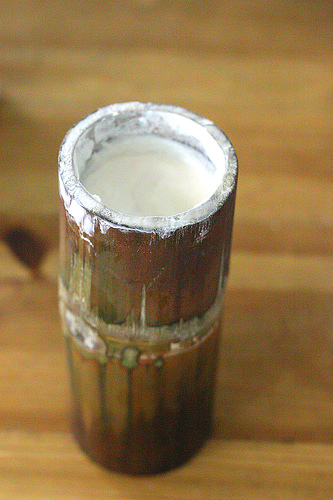
Dadiah is a traditional fermented milk of West Sumatra, Indonesia prepared with fresh, raw, and unheated buffalo milk.

Fermented milk products or fermented dairy products, also known as cultured dairy foods, cultured dairy products, or cultured milk products, are dairy foods that have been made by fermenting milk with lactic acid bacteria such as Lactobacillus, Lactococcus, and Leuconostoc. The process of culturing increases the shelf life of the product, while enhancing its taste and improving digestibility by the fermentation breakdown of the milk sugar, lactose.

There is evidence that fermented milk products have been produced since around 10,000 BCE. Numerous Lactobacilli strains have been grown in laboratories allowing for diverse cultured milk products with different flavors and characteristics. Most of the bacteria needed to make these products thrive under specific conditions, giving a favorable environment for production of fermented foods, such as cheese, yogurt, kefir, and buttermilk.

== Production and storage ==
Although milk is high in nutrients, fat, and sugars, it can spoil quickly. In general, fermentation by yeasts and bacteria metabolizes the lactose in dairy products into acidic breakdown products, such as lactic acid, acting to preserve the product. These cultures inhibit potentially harmful microbes that may cause food spoilage.

With a longer and more complete fermentation process, a reduced amount of lactose remains. Less-fermented products, such as yogurts or soft cheeses, contain more lactose when compared to matured hard cheeses.

High levels of lactose in food are linked to poor digestion in people of Africa and Far East Asia where dairy farming is uncommon, and in people who have lactose intolerance. This condition occurs from the loss of lactase production – an enzyme present in infant mammals to digest milk.

== Products ==
Many different types of cultured milk products can be found around the world, including milk, cheese, yogurt, kefir, sour cream, buttermilk, and more.

=== Soured milk ===
Country/region of origin	Product(s)
	acidophilus milk
	buttermilk
	cheese
Armenia	matzoon
Arab world	leben, kishk, rayeb
Bosnia and Herzegovina	kiselo mlijeko and kefir
Brazil	coalhada
Brittany	laezh-ribod
Bulgaria	kiselo mlyako, katak, ayryan and kefir
Burundi	urubu
Central Asia	chal/shubat, chalap, kumis, qatyq, qurt, suzma, ayran
Czech Republic	kefír or acidofilní mléko
Denmark	kærnemælk, tykmælk, and ymer
Dominican Republic	Boruga
Ethiopia	ergo
Estonia	soured milk and kefir
Finland	soured milk and viili
Germany	Sauermilch or Dickmilch (soured milk or thickened milk), Quark
Georgia	matsoni
Greece	xinogalo or xinogala (ξινόγαλα), ariani (αριάνι), kefiri (κεφίρι)
Hungary	aludttej, joghurt, kefir, tejföl
Iceland	skyr and súrmjólk
India	dahi, lassi, chaas or Moru (Indian ButterMilk), mattha, mishti doi and shrikhand
Indonesia	dadiah, from buffalo milk
Iran	doogh, kashk, ghara
Kurdistan Region	Mastaw
Middle East	leben
Japan (more info^{(ja)})	Calpis, Yakult
Kenya	Kule Naoto, Maziwa Lala, Mursik, Amabere amaruranu Mala
Latvia	rūgušpiens, kefīrs, paniņas, lakto
Lithuania	rūgpienis, kefyras
Namibia	Omaere, Omatuka
North Macedonia	kiselo mleko
Mexico	jocoque
Mongolia	airag, byaslag, tarag, khuruud
Netherlands	karnemelk (buttermilk), drinkyoghurt (usually fruit-flavoured fermented dairy beverages)
Nicaragua	leche agria (soured milk)
Norway	surmjølk or kulturmelk, and tjukkmjølk
Pakistan	dahi and lassi
Poland	soured milk (including "acidofilne" milk), kefir, buttermilk, twaróg
Romania	lapte bătut, lapte acru, kefir and sana
Russia, Ukraine, Belarus	kefir, prostokvasha, ryazhenka, varenets, tvorog, acidophiline, bifidok
Rwanda	kivuguto
Scotland	blaand
Serbia	kiselo mleko and yogurt
Slovakia	kefír or acidofilné mlieko
Slovenia	kislo mleko
South Africa	amasi (maas in Afrikaans)
Sudan	rob
Sweden	filmjölk, långfil and A-fil (fil is the short form of filmjölk)
Tanzania	Maziwa Mgando, Maziwa Mtindi
Turkic countries	ayran, qatiq, kefir, yoğurt, kımız
United States	clabber
Zambia	Mabisi
Zimbabwe	lacto

=== Soured cream ===
Country/region of origin	Product(s)
	cheese
British Isles, Germany and The Netherlands	sour cream
Central Asia	kaymak
Central & Eastern Europe; and Russia	smetana
Croatia	mileram/kiselo vrhnje
Estonia	hapukoor
Finland	kermaviili
France	crème fraîche
Iceland	sýrður rjómi
Hungary	tejföl
Latvia	skābais krējums
Lithuania	grietinė
Mexico	crema/cream espesa
Norway	rømme
Poland	kwaśna śmietana
Romania	smântână
Serbia	kisela pavlaka
Slovakia	smotana
Sweden	gräddfil
Tanzania	Samli

== Comparison chart ==
Product	Alternative names	Typical milkfat content	Typical shelf life at 4 °C	Fermentation agent	Description
Cheese		1-75%	varies	a variety of bacteria or mold	Any number of solid fermented milk products.
Crème fraîche	creme fraiche	30-40%	10 days	naturally occurring lactic acid bacteria in cream	Mesophilic fermented cream, originally from France; higher-fat variant of sour cream
Cultured sour cream	sour cream	14–40%	4 weeks	Lactococcus lactis subsp. lactis*	Mesophilic fermented pasteurized cream with an acidity of at least 0.5%. Rennet extract may be added to make a thicker product. Lower fat variant of crème fraîche
Filmjölk	fil	0.1-4.5%	10–14 days	Lactococcus lactis* and Leuconostoc	Mesophilic fermented milk, originally from Scandinavia
Yogurt	yoghurt, yogourt, yoghourt	0.5–4%	35–40 days	Lactobacillus bulgaricus and Streptococcus thermophilus	Thermophilic fermented milk, cultured with Lactobacillus bulgaricus and Streptococcus thermophilus
Kefir	kephir, kewra, talai, mudu kekiya, milkkefir, búlgaros	0-4%	10–14 days	Kefir grains, a mixture of bacteria and yeasts	A fermented beverage, originally from the Caucasus region, made with kefir grains; can be made with any sugary liquid, such as milk from mammals, soy milk, or fruit juices
Kumis	koumiss, kumiss, kymys, kymyz, airag, chigee	4%?	10–14 days	Lactobacilli and yeasts	A carbonated fermented milk beverage traditionally made from horse milk
Viili	filbunke	0.1-3.5%	14 days	Lactococcus lactis subsp. cremoris, Lactococcus lactis* biovar. diacetylactis, Leuconostoc mesenteroides subsp. cremoris and Geotrichum candidum	Mesophilic fermented milk that may or may not contain fungus on the surface; originally from Sweden; a Finnish specialty
Cultured buttermilk		1–2%	10 days	Lactococcus lactis* (subsp. lactis*, subsp. cremoris, biovar. diacetylactis) and Leuconostoc mesenteroides subsp. cremoris	Mesophilic fermented pasteurized milk
Acidophilus milk	acidophilus cultured milk	0.5-2%	2 weeks	Lactobacillus acidophilus	Thermophilic fermented milk, often lowfat (2%, 1.5%) or nonfat (0.5%), cultured with Lactobacillus acidophilus

* Streptococcus lactis has been renamed to Lactococcus lactis subsp. lactis

== See also ==
- List of dairy products
- List of yogurt-based dishes and beverages
