= Ymer (dairy product) =

Soured milk product

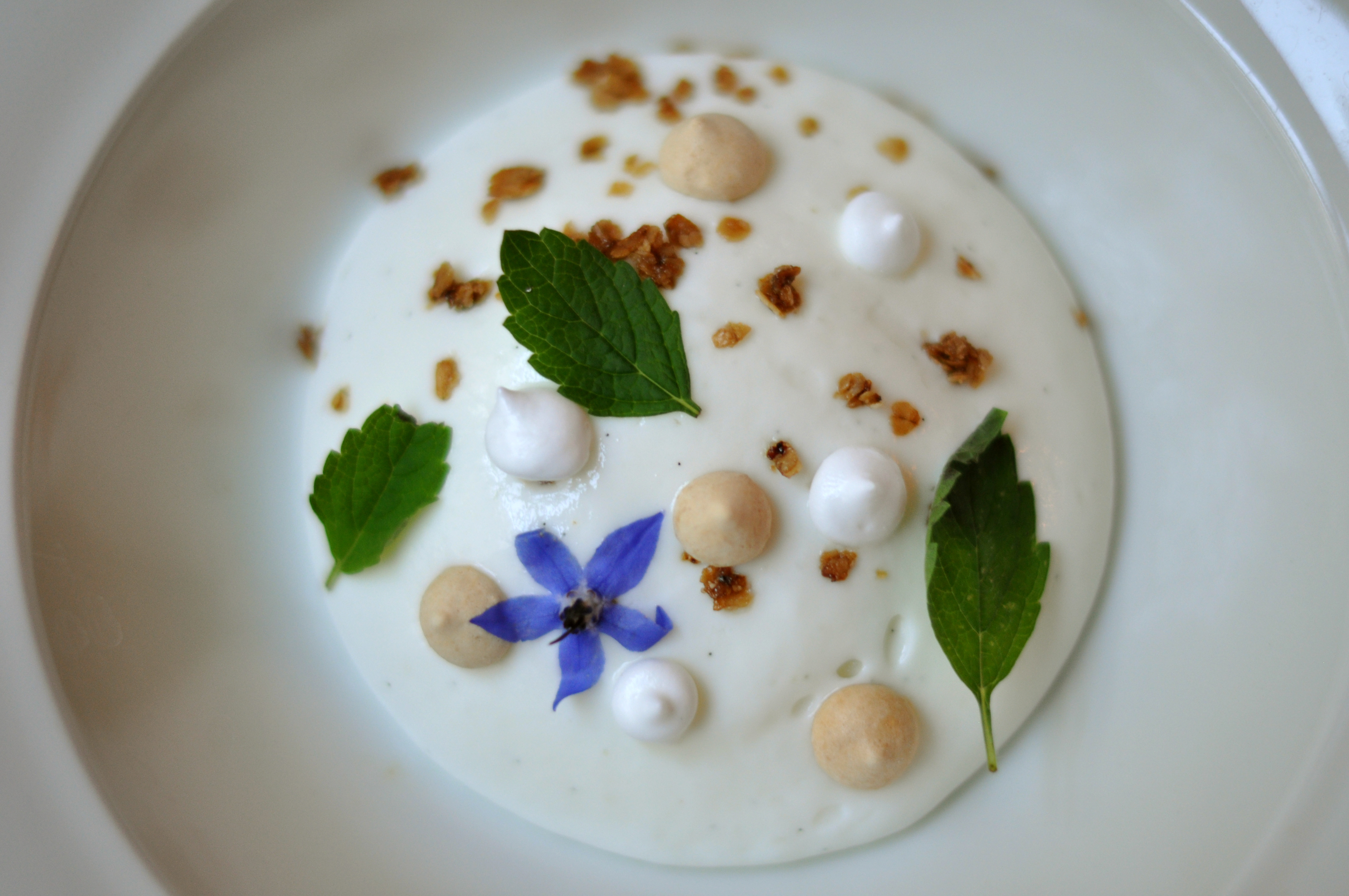
- A modern version of a ymer mousse dessert, ymerfromage, with sorrel parfait, oatmeal, and meringue, served at a New Nordic-influenced restaurant
- Type: Fermented dairy product
- Place of origin: Denmark
- Serving temperature: Chilled
- Main ingredients: skimmed milk, bacteria
- Food energy (per 100 g serving): 71 kcal (300 kJ)
Nutritional value
(per 100 g serving)
- Protein: 5–6 g
- Fat: 3.5 g
- Carbohydrate: 3–4 g

Ymer is a Danish concentrated fermented milk product. It is produced using skimmed milk and bacterial cultures. Ymer began production in the 1930s, and is today eaten for breakfast, added in desserts, and used as an alternative to yogurt.

Unlike other fermented milk products, ymer is drained of its whey. As a result, it has a higher content of solids, including protein, while the addition of cream to the final product is used to maintain ymer's fat content at 3.5%, the same as that of whole milk. Compared to standard yogurt, it has a thicker, creamier consistency and a higher protein content. It has a slightly buttery taste and may be very subtly fizzy due to slight carbonation from lactic acid fermentation.

== History ==
It was launched commercially in the 1930s. Originally, it was made by fermenting whole milk with the bacterial culture Lactococcus lactis. After the milk soured, the whey was then drained off. Today, filtered skimmed milk is typically used instead.

Ymer is named after the primordial being Ymir who in Norse mythology was fed by four rivers of milk. In 1937, dairyman E. Larsen in Hatting registered his new soured milk product as ymer; the name was then used by other dairies that began making the product. It is speculated that Larsen created Ymer by accident while attempting to produce yogurt; having heated the milk to a higher heat that usual, the fermented curd separated from the whey, producing Ymer instead of Yogurt.

== Production ==
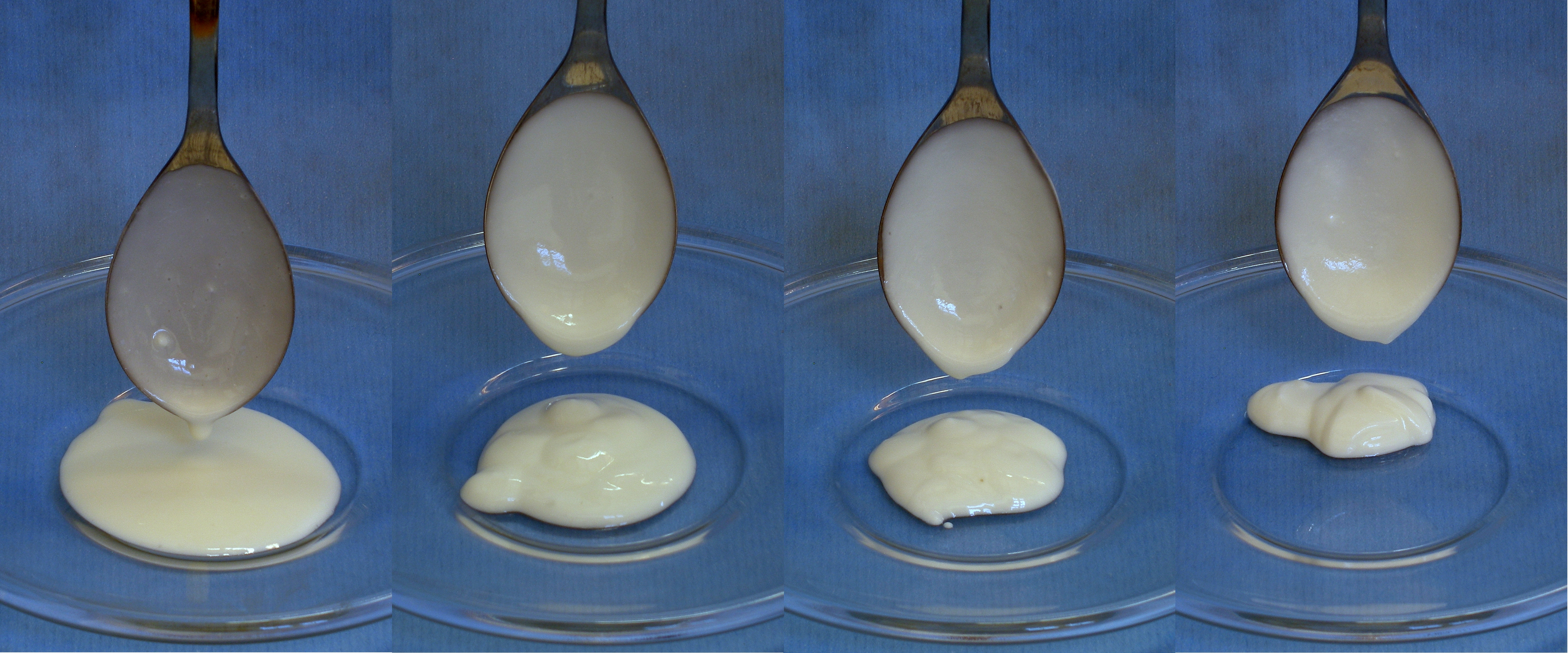
Comparison of the consistency of various Danish milk products, all with 3.5% fat content. From left to right: soured milk, fermented milk, whole milk yogurt, and ymer on the far right.

Ymer is traditionally produced using skimmed milk with a fat content of 0.1%, which is heated to 90–95 °C, then cooled to 19–23 °C, at which point a starter culture is added. The starter culture used to produce ymer contains Lactococcus lactis bv. diacetylactis and Leuconostoc mesenteroides subsp. cremoris.

Once the culture has been incorporated into the milk, the mixture is maintained at 18 °C to ferment for at least 16 hours and until its pH falls below 4.6. The resulting curd is then cut and warmed to around 45 °C over the course of several hours, causing the whey to separate through syneresis. The whey, which constitutes around 50% of the cultured milk's volume, is removed. Cream is then added to adjust the fat content to approximately 3.5%. A lighter form of Ymer, called Ylette (lit. 'Ymer-light'), follows the same method of production, but contains only 1.5% fat. After adding the cream, the final product is blended and maintained above 35 °C to homogenize the mixture.

== Preparation ==
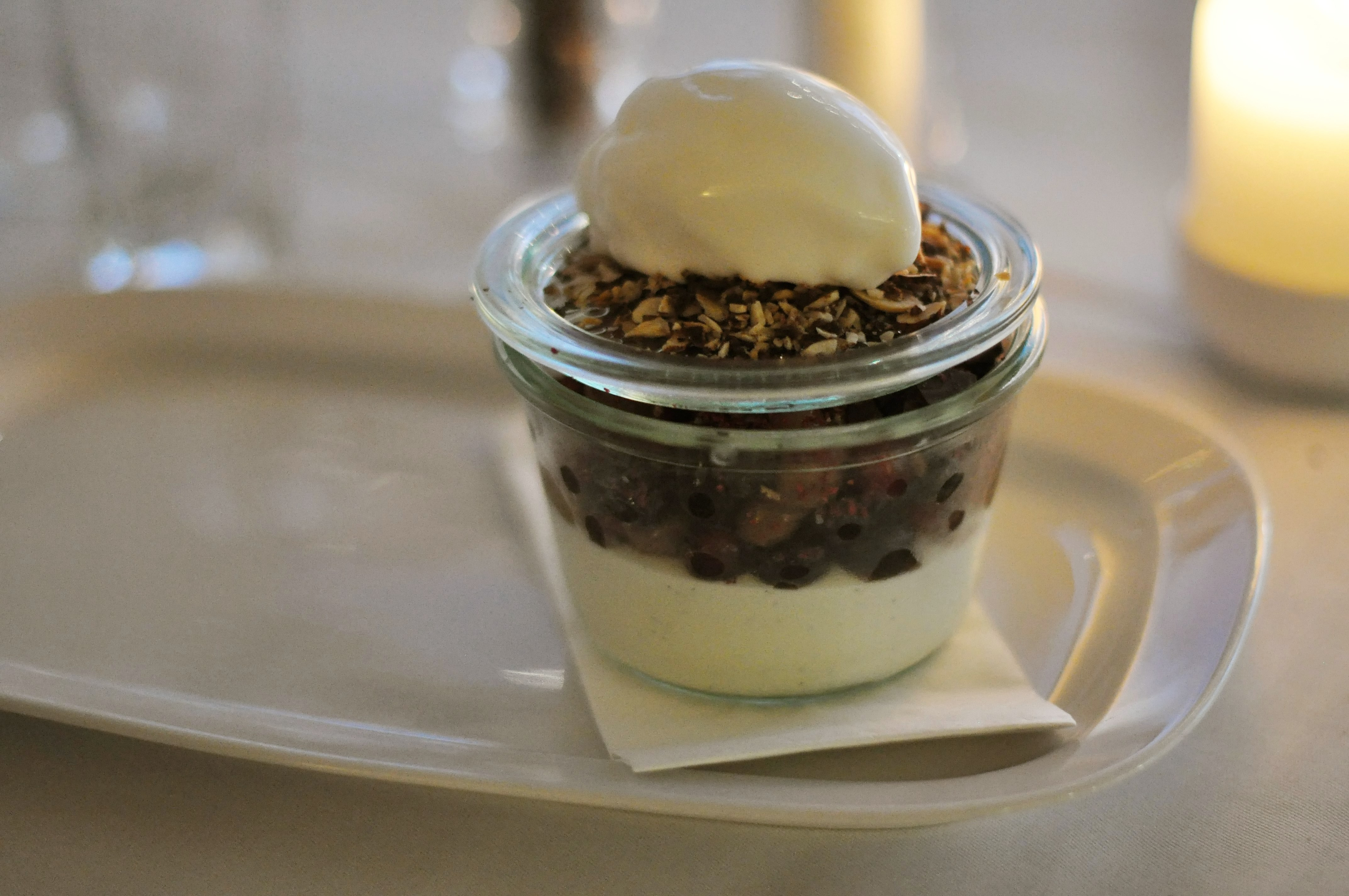
Ymer mousse dessert with berries, caramel and elderflower sorbet

Ymer is typically sold unflavoured and unsweetened. It is mostly eaten for breakfasts or as a snack, but is also used as an alternative to yogurt, in desserts, dressings, and baking. For breakfast, it may be served topped with ymerdrys (lit. 'ymer sprinkle'), a mix of lightly toasted rugbrød breadcrumbs and brown sugar.

Ymer is mixed with sugar, gelatin, and cream to create the desert ymerfromage (fromage meaning dessert cream in Danish).

== See also ==
- List of fermented milk products
- List of yogurt-based dishes and beverages
