= Bonnie Clabber Bluff =

Cliff in Burke County, Georgia, United States

Coordinates: 32°19′44″N 82°44′55″W

Bonnie Clabber Bluff is a cliff located in Burke County, Georgia. A variant spelling is "Bonny Clabber Bluff".

Bonnie Clabber Bluff most likely was named after the foodstuff bonny clabber.
