= Napolact =

Romanian dairy company

- Founded: 1905; 121 years ago
- Headquarters: Romania
- Website: www.napolact.ro

Napolact is the main Romanian brand which belongs to the Dutch company FrieslandCampina and it’s one of the biggest dairy producers in Romania. It owns three production facilities in Cluj (Baciu), Târgu Mureș and Țaga.

== History ==
In 1905, “Atelierul Vlad” (Vlad's workshop), was certified in Cluj-Napoca as a producer of dairy products, more specifically, butter and cottage cheese. They grew steadily until 1936 by which time they had expanded their portfolio to yoghurt and fermented and melted cheese. The small dairy factory was nationalized in 1948 when the government took over control of all private industries at the time. Since then it was known as “The Milk Industrialization Enterprise Cluj” until 1990 when they became known as simply “Napolact”. Shortly after, in 1994, Napolact received numerous prizes and distinctions from the Romanian government for its high-quality products. With high average production capacity, Napolact had become the leader of the Romanian dairy market by 1998. Their success came from the strong relationship they developed and maintained with their milk producers through considerable investments in their farms each year. Following a simple rule they strengthened the relationship: each farmer that had at least seven but no more than ten cows would receive a sum of money which they had to pay back without interest with the purpose of acquiring seven more cows. In 2004 the majority of their shares was bought by the Friesland company.

== Production and distribution ==
Currently the production is done at the Baciu dairy factory, Târgu Mureș dairy factory and the distribution consists of two warehouses in Cluj-Napoca and Bucharest from which stores situated all over Romania are supplied. For all of the Napolact products, the FrieslandCampina company uses raw milk exclusively obtained from farmers in Ardeal all year long.

== Modernization ==
Starting all the way back in 1990, the company has been through many modernization processes. The most important ones have been implemented after 2004 when Napolact had been taken over by Friesland and the introduction of European factory standards. Thus, the factories in Baciu and Targu Mures had received major improvements to both their quality level and production capacity. In 2014, Napolact opened their first store with a coffee shop in Cluj-Napoca.

== Products ==
The product portfolio of Napolact covers most of the main dairy products and they are as follows:

- Milk
- Yoghurts
- Buttermilk
- Butter
- Sour cream
- Cheese

Some of the Napolact products have been certified by the: Cedra yoghurt, Nasal cheese, Tarnava cheese, Alpina cheese, Smoked Alpina cheese, Bobalna cheese, Dej cheese and Huedin telemea. Likewise, Napolact had launched the product range as of April 2015 which contains milk, yoghurt, Sana and Kefir. These products come from 14 organic farms in Ardeal (which is just another name for Transylvania), sheltered from any sources of pollution. Special documentation proves that the resulted milk come from animals which have been raised in all-natural circumstances. This includes food which have no additives, antibiotics or any other type of chemicals.

== Prizes ==
Since 1994, Napolact has received various distinctions and prizes awarded by the Romanian government because of the quality of their products. In 2003 they had been situated on the first place in the “food industry, large enterprises” category and had also received an eminence diploma at the 10th edition of “Topului National al Firmelor”. In 2013, Napolact had been declared the most trusted brand in the dairy industry according to the “” case study done by “Reader’s Digest in Romania” magazine. The studies used only open-ended questions in which consumers were asked to enlist brands.

== Ţaga natural cave ==
At Ţaga, Cluj County, in a natural cave from the Middle Ages, in microbiological conditions that are unique in the world. The rock of the cave and the Brevibacterium linens bacteria which developed in it, the constant temperature and humidity, act on the cheeses produced here.

== See also ==
- Romanian Companies
- Cluj-Napoca Companies
