= Sana (dairy product) =

Fermented milk drink

Sana is a fermented milk drink similar to kefir, buttermilk or soured milk that is made from unpasteurised raw milk and slightly sweeter in taste. It usually contains at least 3.6 percent fat.

Sana originated in Romania, where it has been a part of the national diet for centuries. Sana is also used as an ingredient for baking breads and pastries.

== Production ==
Sana is mostly made from cow's milk, but has also been made of milk from sheep and buffalo. In recent years, varieties using goat milk have become increasingly popular, mainly due to the perceived health benefits of goat milk.

== Nutrition ==
Similar to other fermented dairy products, sana has health and gut benefits that contribute to a healthier gut microbiome.
