= Crème fraîche =

Soured cream dairy product

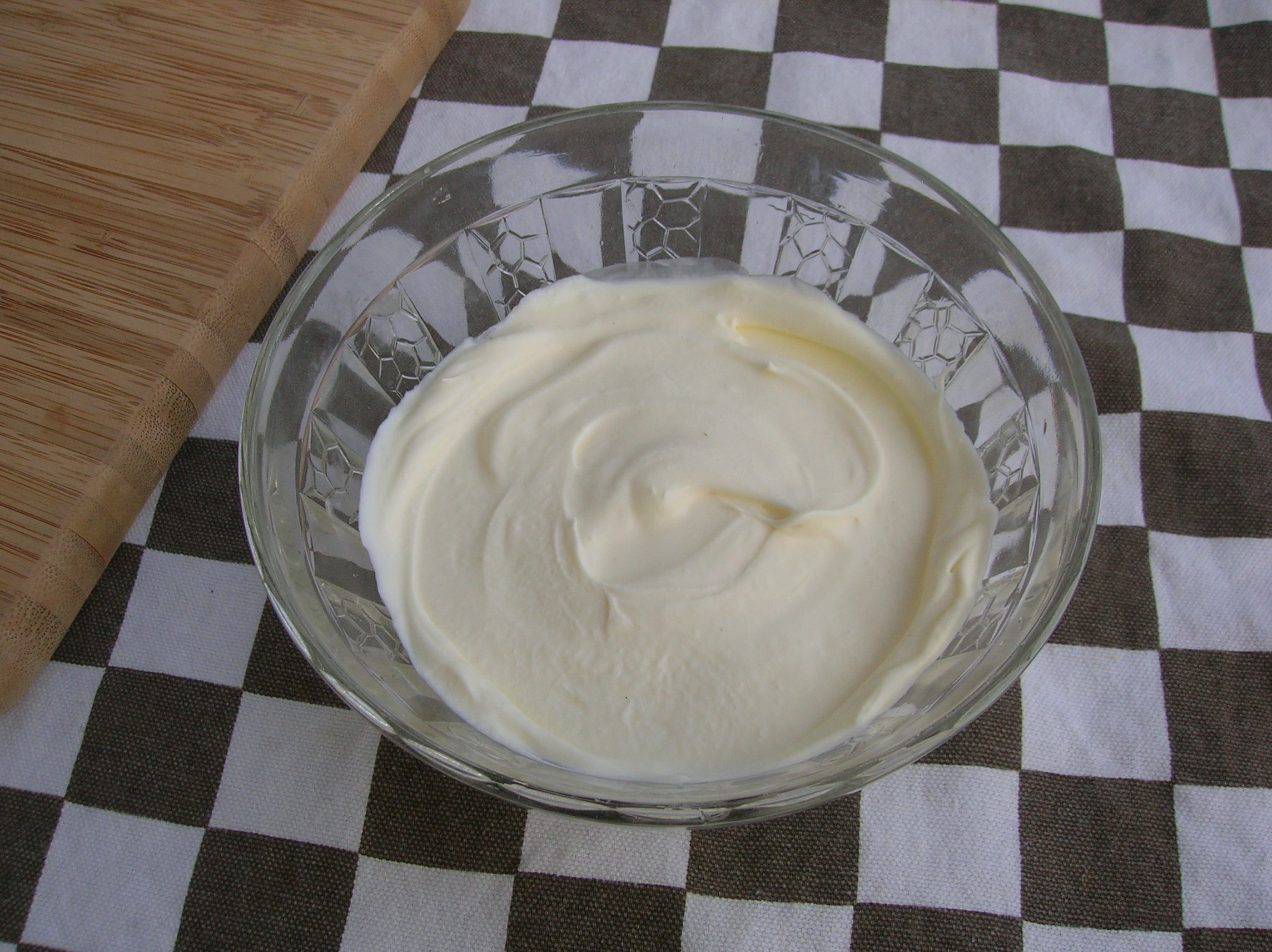

Crème fraîche (English: /ˌkrɛmˈfrɛʃ/, French: [kʁɛm fʁɛːʃ], lit. 'fresh cream') is a dairy product similar to sour cream; it is a soured cream containing 10–45% butterfat, with a pH of approximately 4.5. It is soured with a bacterial culture. European labeling regulations specify the two ingredients must be cream and bacterial culture. It is served over fruit and baked goods, as well as being added to soups and sauces. It is used in a variety of other recipes. Sour cream is a similar foodstuff, except that crème fraîche is less sour and has a higher fat content. Sour cream may contain thickening agents not permitted in crème fraîche in many jurisdictions.

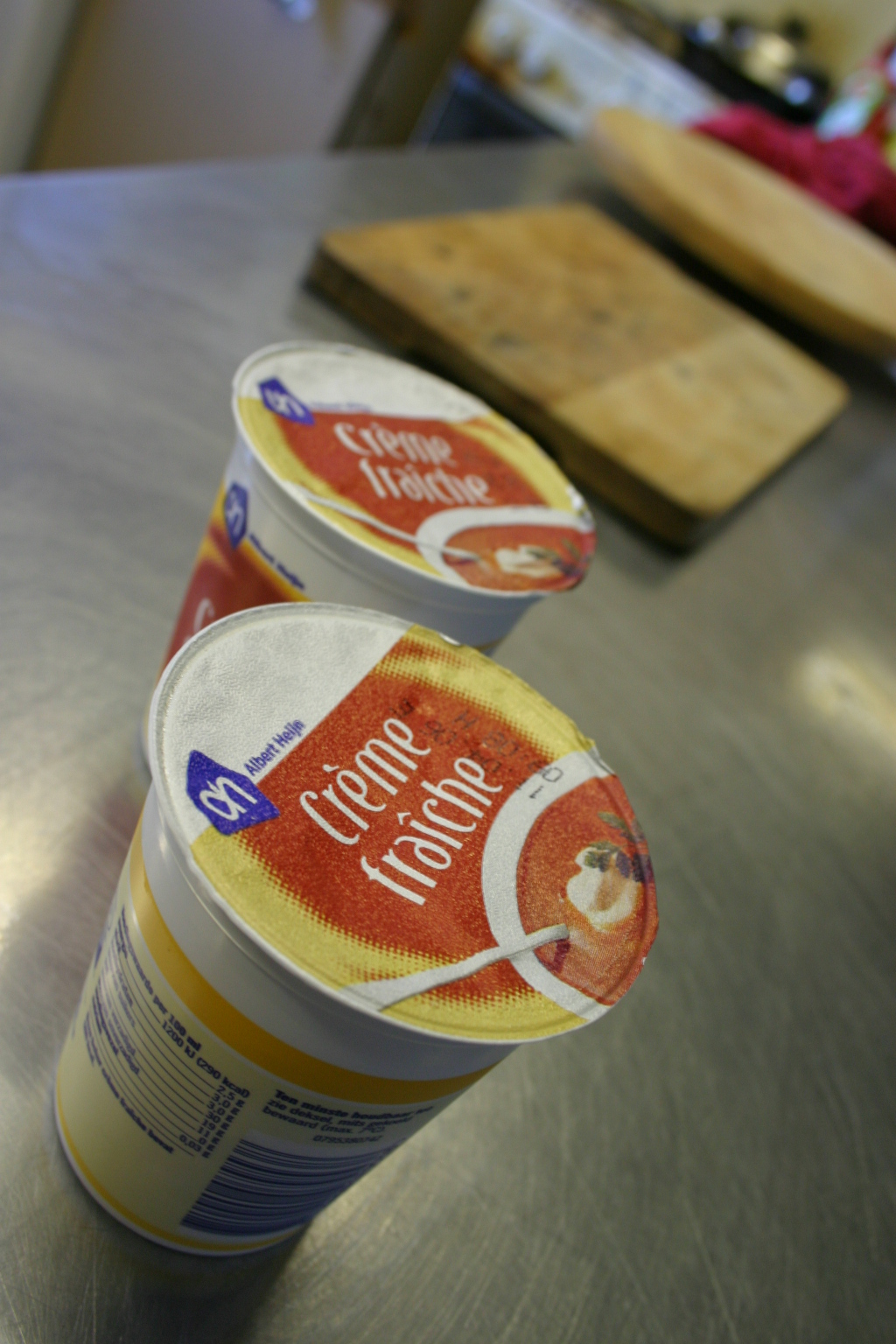
Containers of crème fraîche

== Terminology ==
The name crème fraîche is French, but similar soured creams are found in much of northern Europe, and a traditional soured cream (crema fresca in Spanish) used in Central America resembles it. A literal translation of crème fraîche is "fresh cream". However, in French-speaking countries, crème fraîche may refer to either: (A) the thick fermented product, crème fraîche épaisse or fermentée, or (B) a liquid cream, crème fraîche liquide or fleurette. In these countries, crème fraîche without qualification normally refers to liquid cream, with the thick form usually called crème épaisse (thick cream). In other countries, however, crème fraîche without qualification usually refers to the thick, fermented product.

== Production ==
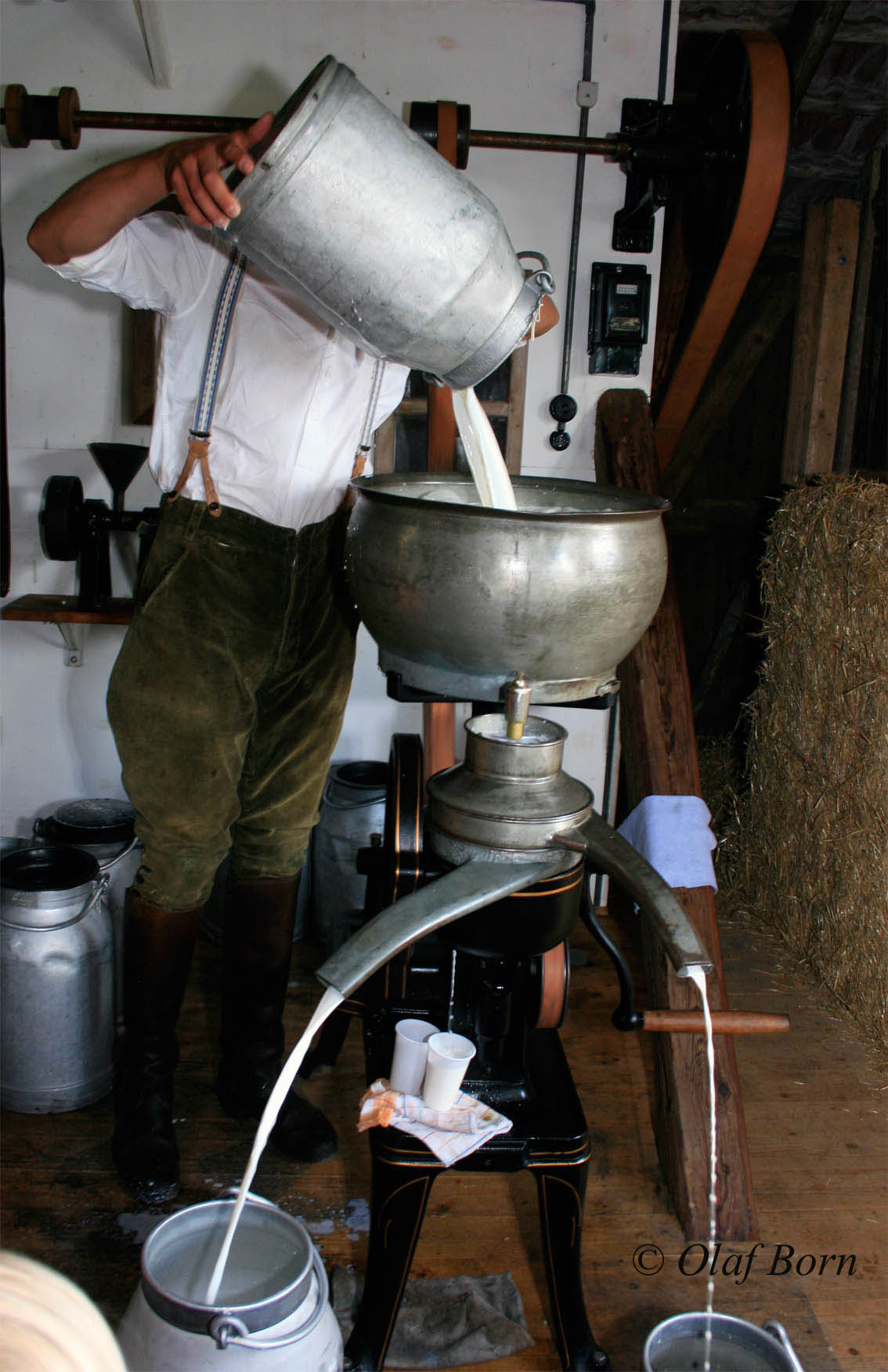
Separation of milk using a traditional dairy centrifuge by a farmer

Crème fraîche is produced by adding a starter culture to heavy cream and allowing it to stand at an appropriate temperature until it thickens. The culture is made up of a mix of bacteria including, Lactococcus species L. cremoris, L. lactis, and L. lactis biovar diacetylactis. These bacteria give it the taste that distinguishes it from similar dairy products such as sour cream. Recipes for cooks making crème fraîche at home may substitute cultured buttermilk with active cultures for the starter culture.

In some places in Europe, the fat content of crème fraîche is regulated, and it may not contain ingredients other than cream and starter culture.

In North America and the UK, products labeled "low-fat crème fraîche" with approximately 15% butterfat and with added stabilizers such as xanthan gum or starch from maize or corn, are commercialized. This product is less stable than crème fraîche when heated.

== Physico-chemical properties ==
Crème fraîche consists of double cream and a starter culture. In most places in Europe, strict regulation is placed on the production of crème fraîche, prohibiting the addition of any stabilizers, bulking agents, or emulsifiers. Standard crème fraîche contains around 30–45% milkfat while low-fat crème fraîche contains closer to 15% milkfat. During processing, the acidification of the casein micelle begins at around a pH of 6.7; however, the pH of the cream must drop to below 4.6, the isoelectric point of milk, for the casein micelles to fully precipitate out of solution.

The structure of crème fraîche consists of an acid gel composed of milk protein-covered fat globules that tend to agglomerate. This gives the crème fraîche its stability as a highly viscous thixotropic fluid. This gel is only stable in higher fat cultured creams, around 30%, and therefore is not stable nor ubiquitous in low-fat crème fraîche. This is partly the reason why it is impossible to make a low-fat crème fraîche without the addition of stabilizers and bulking agents to generate the same texture as found in regular crème fraîche. Around 50% of the triglycerides in milk fat are long-chain triglycerides (LCT), which at refrigerator temperatures are solid. These triglycerides will tend to crystallize inside the fat globule adding to the gel's stiffness.

== Regions ==
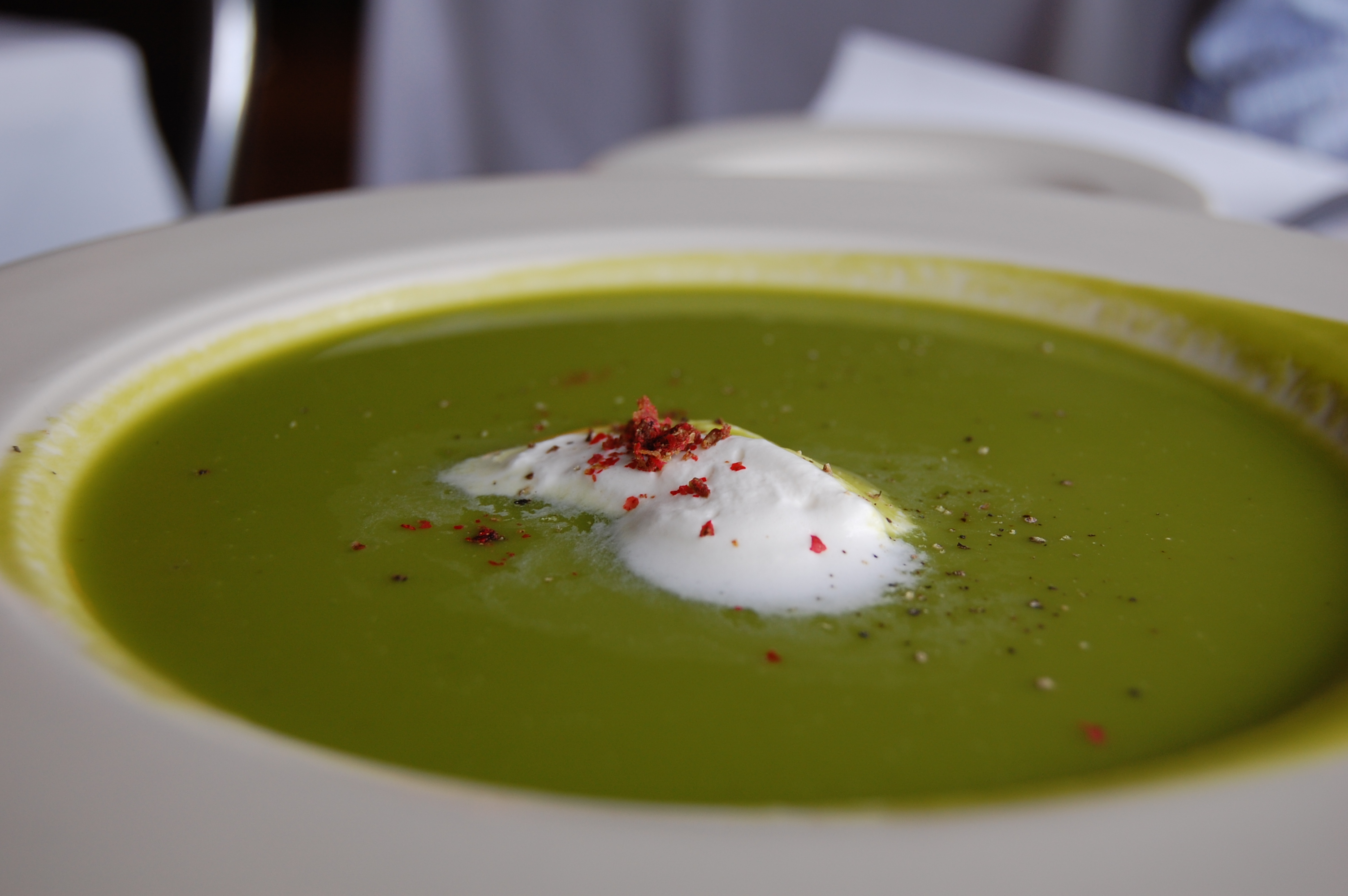
Chilled asparagus soup with crème fraîche and pink peppercorn

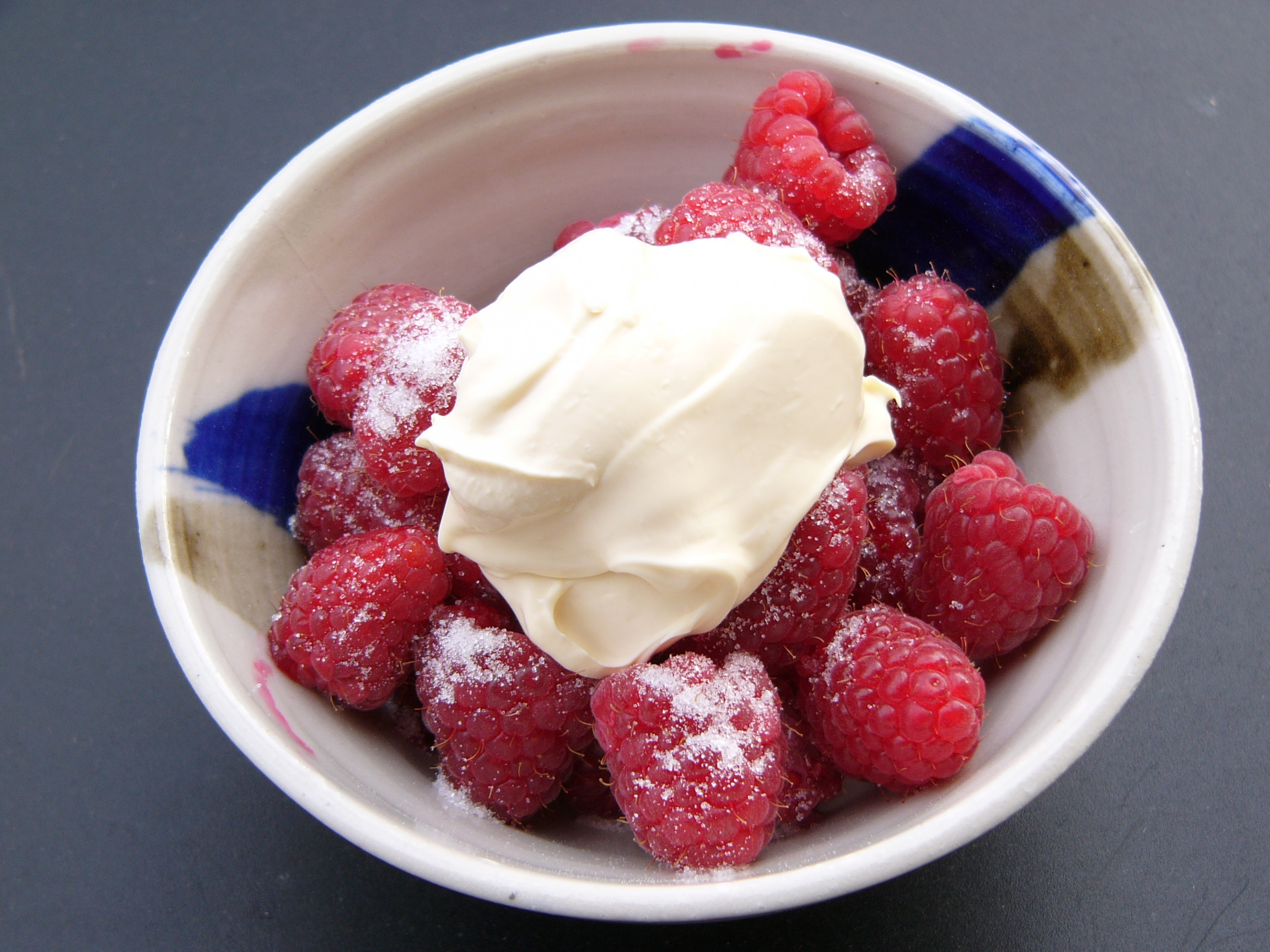
Raspberries with crème fraîche and sugar

The crème fraîche from Normandy is known worldwide, and the crème fraîche from a defined area around the town of Isigny-sur-Mer in the Calvados department of Normandy is highly regarded. As of 2018, it is the only cream to have an appellation d'origine contrôlée (AOC), which was awarded in 1986. It also is produced in many other parts of France, with large quantities coming from the major dairy regions of Brittany, Poitou-Charentes, Lorraine, and Champagne-Ardenne.

== Uses ==
Crème fraîche is used both hot and cold in French cuisine. It often is used to finish hot savory sauces, and with its fat content greater than 30%, curdling is not a problem. It is also the basis of many desserts and dessert sauces.

== Similar products ==
Crema Mexicana is a similar cultured sour cream that may contain several other ingredients.

Smetana from Eastern Europe and Russia is very similar also. In Romania and Moldova, the product is called smântână.

== See also ==
- List of dairy products
- List of fermented foods
