= Smetana (dairy product) =

Sour cream from Central and Eastern Europe, Central Asia

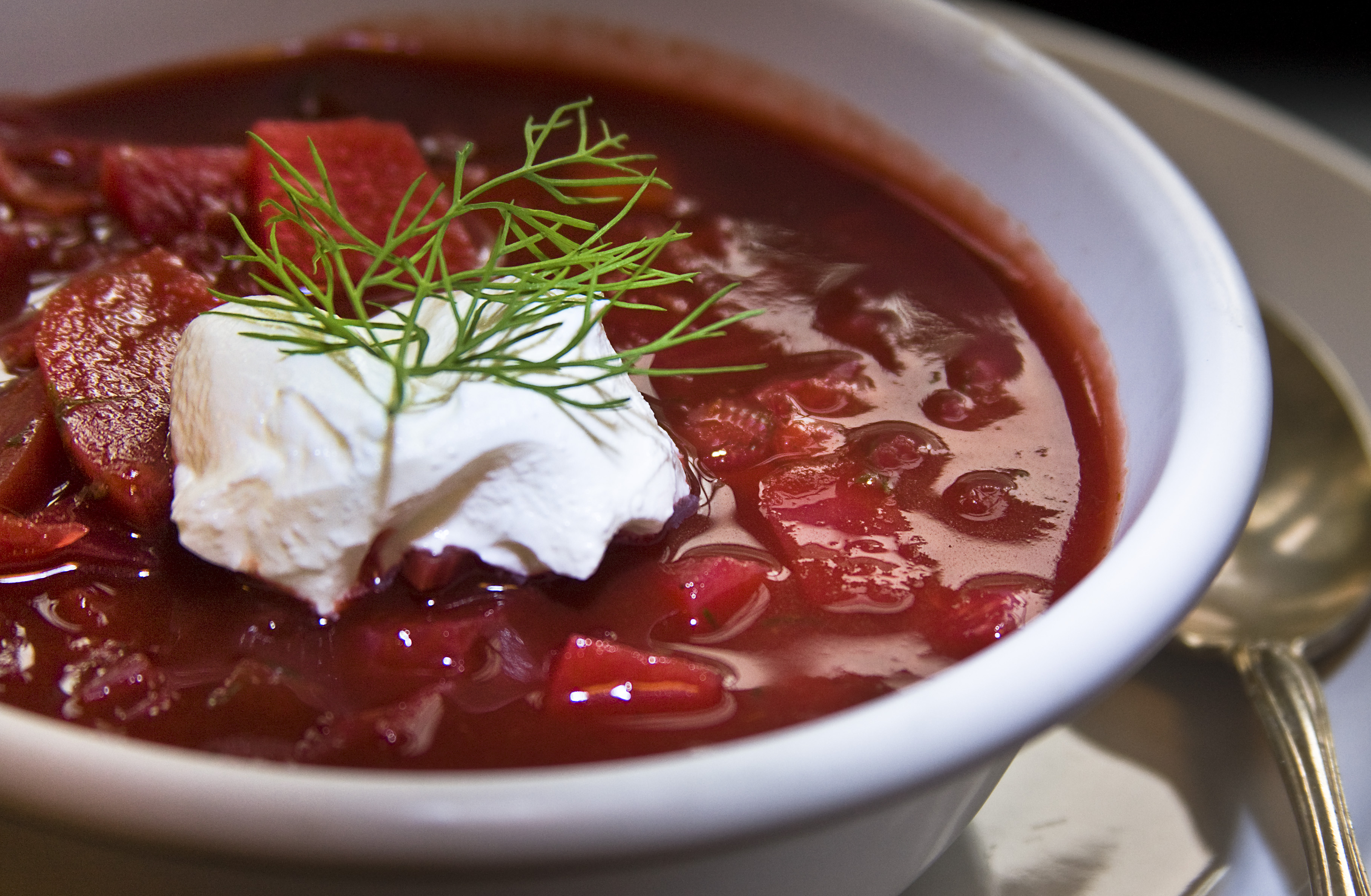
- A bowl of borscht with smetana
- Type: Sour cream
- Region or state: Central and Eastern Europe, Balkans, Central Asia
- Main ingredients: Heavy cream
- Similar dishes: Crème fraîche

Smetana is the English-language name for the different types of sour cream traditionally prevalent in Central, Eastern, and Southeastern Europe, and Central Asia. It is a dairy product produced by souring heavy cream. It is similar to crème fraîche, but nowadays mainly sold with 9% to 42% milkfat content depending on the country. Its cooking properties are different from crème fraîche and sour cream sold in the US, which contain 18% butterfat. It is widely used in cooking and baking.

In some of the Slavic languages (Czech, Slovak, Slovenian) the sole word smetana refers to (sweet) cream. In these cases an adjective (zakysaná, kyslá, kisla) meaning 'soured' is needed when referring to smetana in the English sense.

== Uses and distribution ==
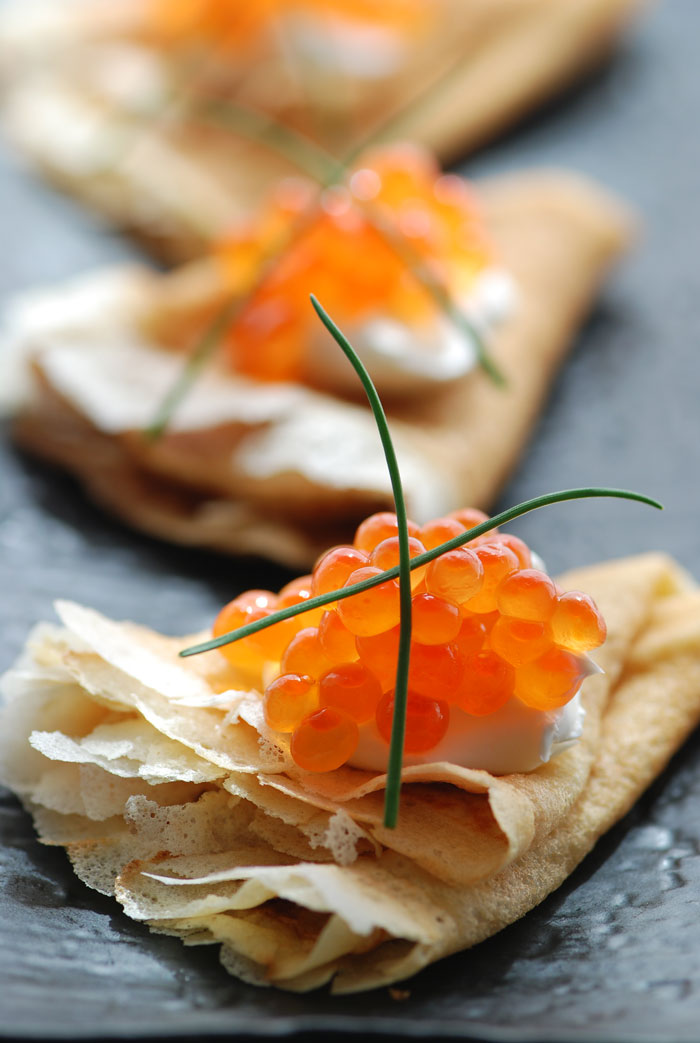
Russian traditional blini with smetana and "red caviar" roe

Smetana is used in Central, Southeastern, and Eastern European cuisines in appetizers, main courses, soups and desserts. For example, it may be blended with soups, vegetable salads, cole slaw, and meat dishes. It is served with dumplings (pelmeni, pierogi, varenyky), or with pancakes (bliny, palacsinta, naleśniki, oladyi, syrniki). It is also used as a filling in savoury pancakes. Smetana can be blended to a Liptauer-like cheese spread with quark or cottage cheese, onions, paprika and other spices, and eaten with bread. Smetana is often used in cooking, as it is high enough in fat not to curdle at higher temperatures. It is used in the preparation of meat stews, such as beef Stroganoff, vegetable stews, casseroles, or other dishes that require a long cooking time in the oven. Smetana does not melt in the oven. Hungarian cooks use it as an ingredient in sauces such as paprikas, and in recipes such as palacsinta (crepes) filled with ham or minced meat (hortobágyi palacsinta). A similar use is common in Eastern European Jewish cuisines, except that smetana is not used with meat dishes due to the Jewish dietary prohibition of mixing dairy products with meat.

Plates of pierogi with smetana and onion

The current trend toward reduced fat content is believed to have resulted in an inferior product. To imitate Hungarian-style cooking and the use of smetana (called tejföl in Hungarian), Hungarian cookbooks recommend using Western sour cream mixed with heavy whipping cream (38–40% milkfat). Unlike sour cream mixed with whipping cream, smetana is not homogenized.

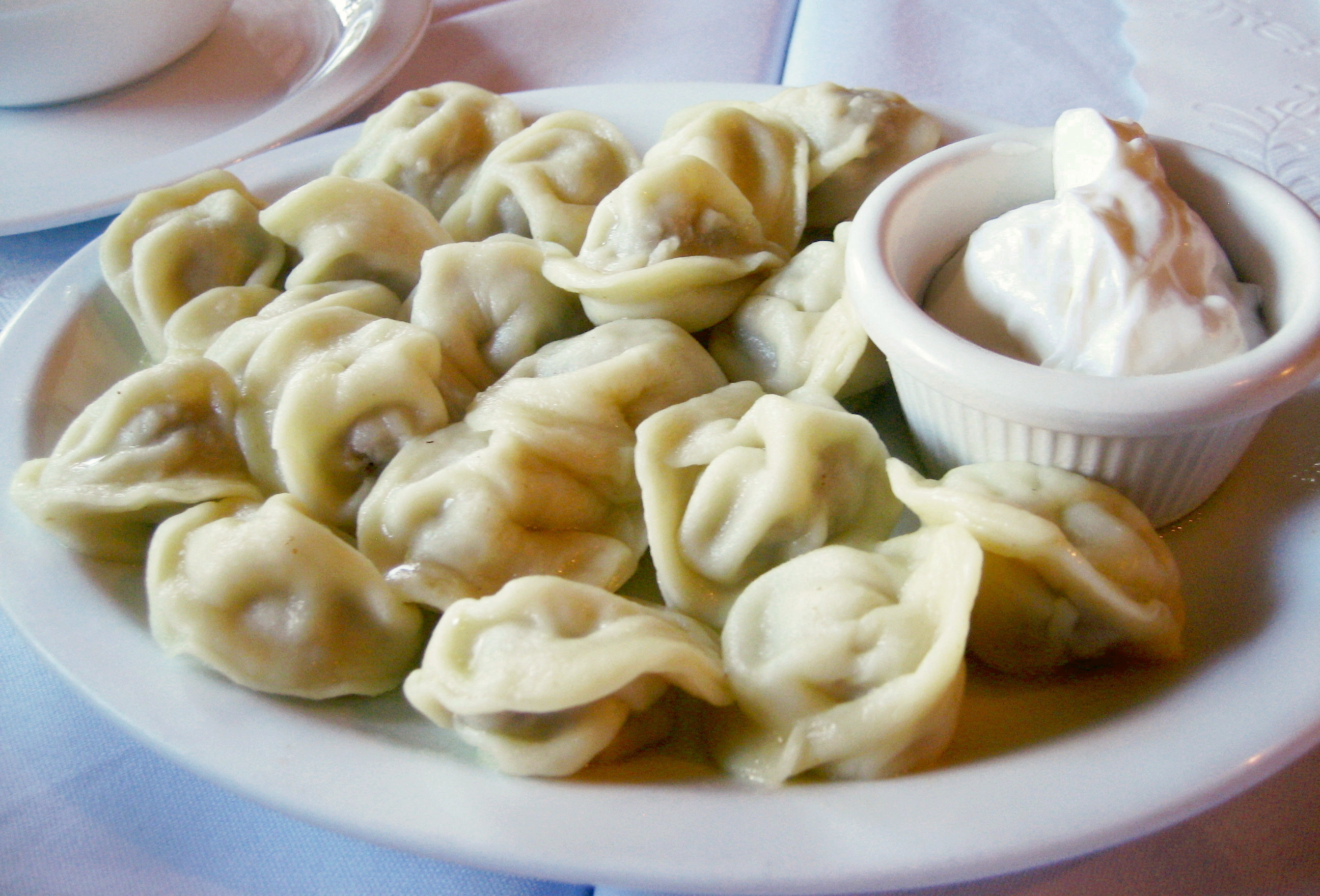
Pelmeni served with smetana

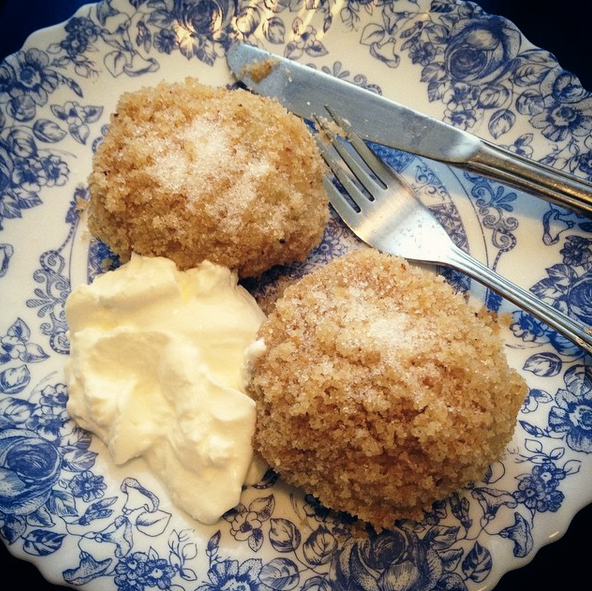
Plum dumplings with sour cream

In Central European countries such as the Czech Republic, Hungary, and Slovakia, smetana may refer to sweet cream or soured cream. It should contain at least 10% fat. Smetana that has at least 30% fat is called smetana ke šlehání (whipping cream) and is used for the production of šlehačka (whipped cream).

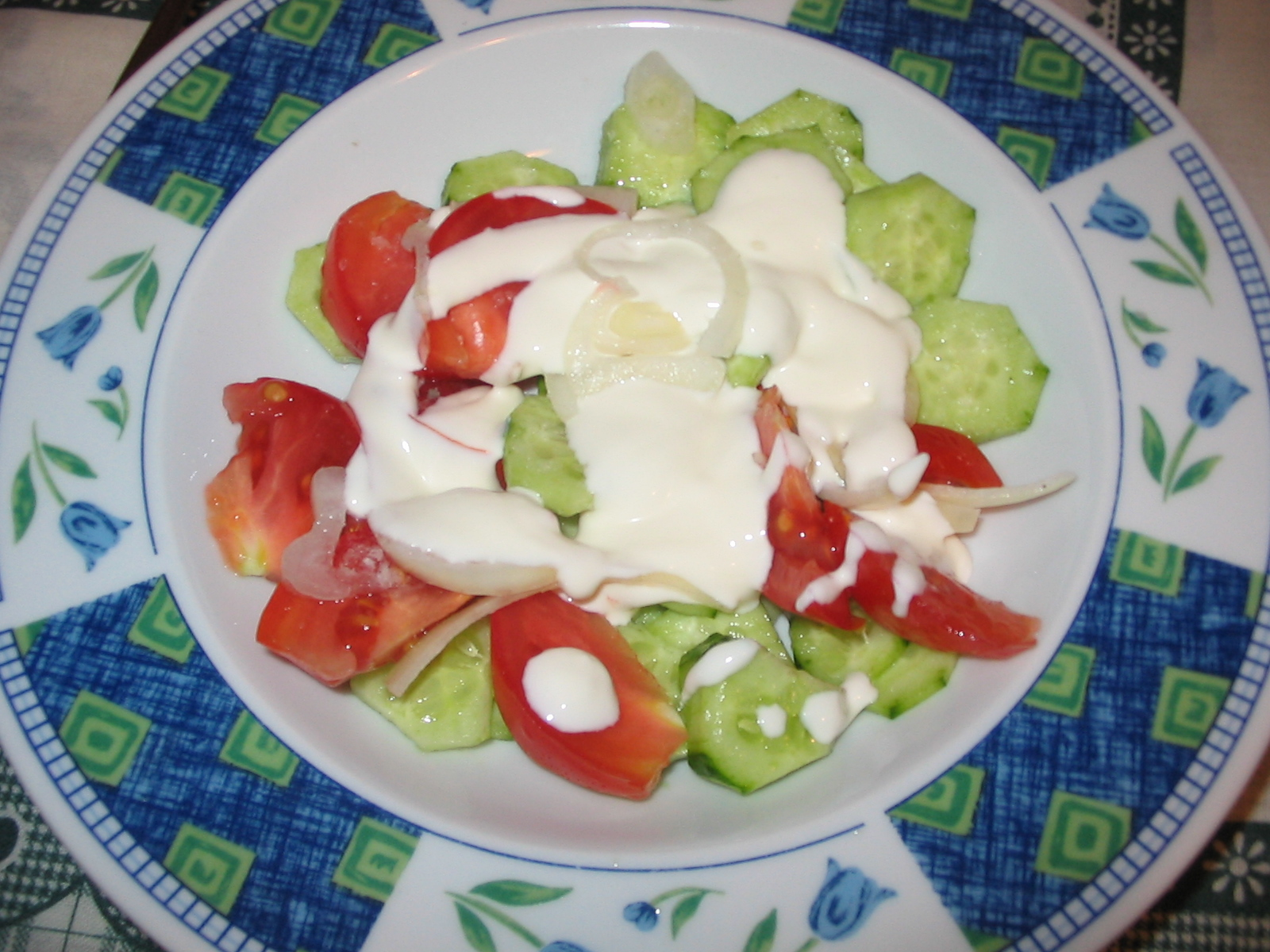
Vegetable salad with smetana

In Ukrainian, Belarusian, and Russian cuisines, sour cream is often added to borscht and other soups, and is used as a salad dressing and as a condiment for dumplings, such as varenyky and pelmeni. Likewise, in Polish cuisine smetana can be added to soups as well as to traditional pierogi dumplings. It is also used in gravies served with Bohemian (Czech) cuisine, such as marinated beef svíčková. In Slovak cuisine, smotana (cognate of smetana) is often incorporated into bryndzové halušky and pierogi.

In Serbia, smetana is consumed in the same manner as in Hungary, or most of Central/Eastern Europe, mainly as an ingredient in stews, pies, salads, or appetizers, while also being consumed as a condiment eaten with savory meaty meals or cold cuts. It can be bought as smetana in rural communities, while mostly being referred as кисела павлака (sour cream) in larger markets where it usually contains between 15 to 30% fat. Historically it used to have a higher fat content, being somewhat more similar to clotted cream than it is today.

Schmand mit Glumse (whipped cream with quark) is used in Prussian and other Germanic cuisines in savory dishes and also for cakes called Schmandkuchen and desserts. A German medical book published in 1677 recommended Schmant or Milchraam as the best part of the milk. Schmand is the cream of the milk, or the foam that rises up like the foam on beer. Schmand or Schmant also describes other fatty foamy material and is known as a byproduct of mining (Grubenschmant), for example in vitriol development. The Central European name for fattier varieties of smetana, mileram, is probably a variation of the earlier Bavarian name for the product, Millirahm, meaning "milk cream".

When comparing brands or suppliers of smetana, the Polish and Russian practice is to compare the fat content of the varieties. Fat content can range from 10% (runny) to 70% (thick). The most common supermarket smetana is 10% to 40% fat (milk fat only for an authentic product). Thickeners such as gelatine or starch may be added, although this is often considered to be adulteration and may make such smetana unsuitable for many culinary uses.

== Etymology ==
The word "smetana" comes from the common Slavic sъmętana, in turn from the verb sъmětati – to remove, to dump. Under this name, this product has spread in most languages: in Russia (смета́на, smetana), Ukraine (смета́на, smetana), Belarus (смята́на, smyatana / śmiatana), Finland (smetana and crème fraîche), German (saure sahne and schmand), Slovenian (kisla smetana), Polish (śmietana), Serbian (сметана, smetana and павлака pavlaka), Bulgarian (заквасена сметана, zakvasena smetana), Slovak (smotana), Czech (zakysaná smetana), and Romanian (smântână).

In Finland, the name "smetana" is used only for a product with a high fat content (30% or more), while ordinary smetana is called hapankerma ("sour cream").

== Smântână ==
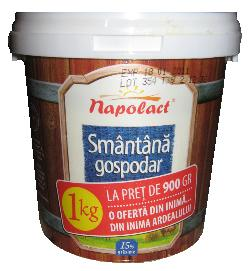
Smântână from Napolact

Smântână is a Romanian dairy product that is produced by separating the milk fat through decantation and retaining the cream. It will not curdle when cooked or if added to hot dishes. Smântână's taste is tangy and sweet; soured smântână is considered spoiled.

The word is a cognate with Slavic smetana (Czech: "cream", Russian: "sour cream").

Smântână is widely used in Romanian cuisine, particularly in appetizers, main courses, soups and desserts. It is often added to ciorbă and other soups, and is used as a condiment for mămăligă and dishes like sarmale.

== See also ==
- Crème fraîche
- Kajmak
- List of English words of Russian origin
- Strained yogurt
- List of dips
