= Acidophiline =

Type of drinkable yogurt

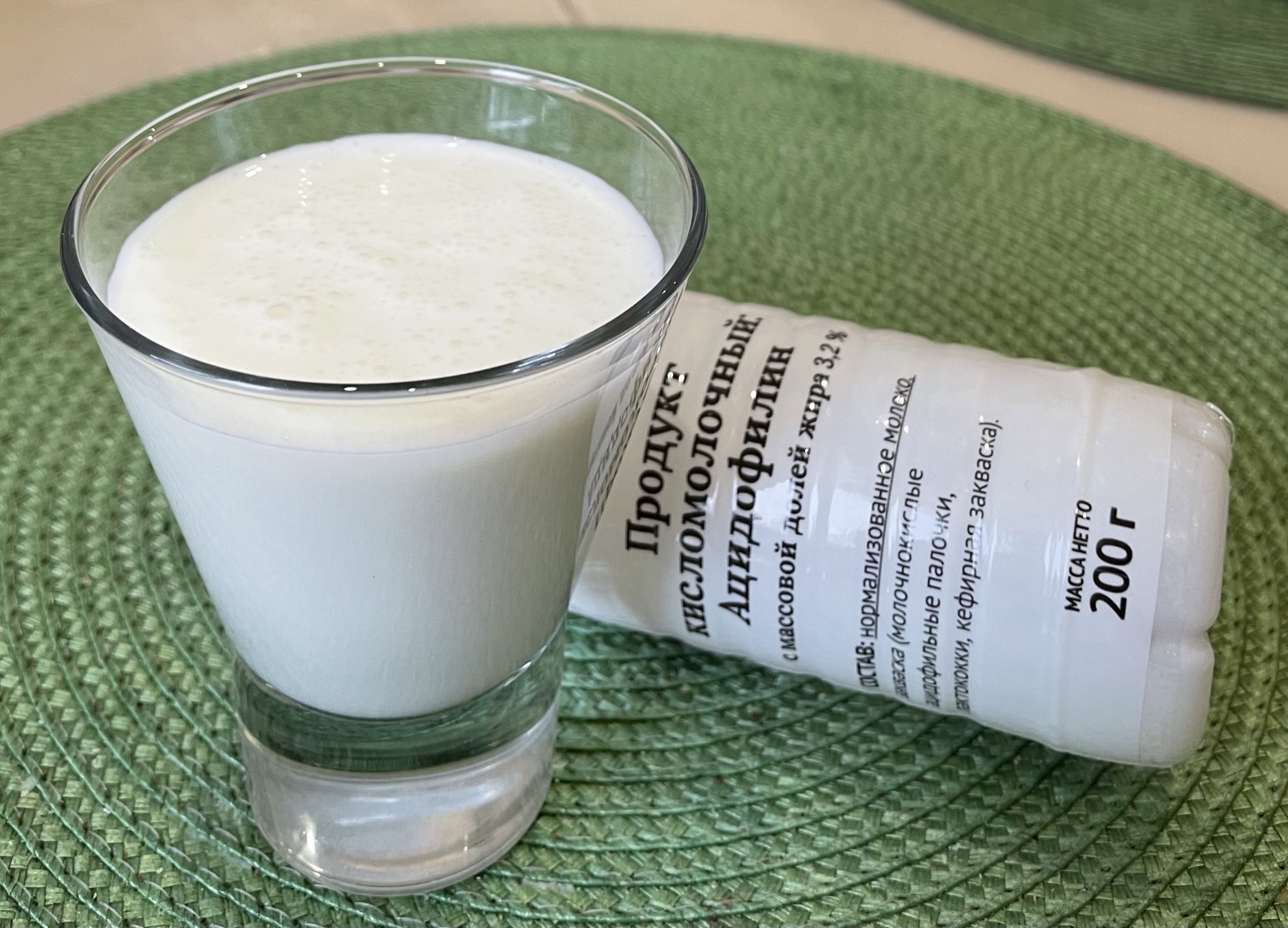

Acidophiline (Russian: ацидофилин) is a type of drinkable yogurt, with Lactobacillus acidophilus as the starter culture. Kefir yeast is also added sometimes. It has antibacterial properties and is used in the former Soviet Bloc countries to treat intestinal diseases such as colitis and enterocolitis. The sweetened acidophiline was widely produced in the USSR, among other fermented milk drinks, such as kefir and ryazhenka.
