= Clabber (food) =

Type of fermented milk

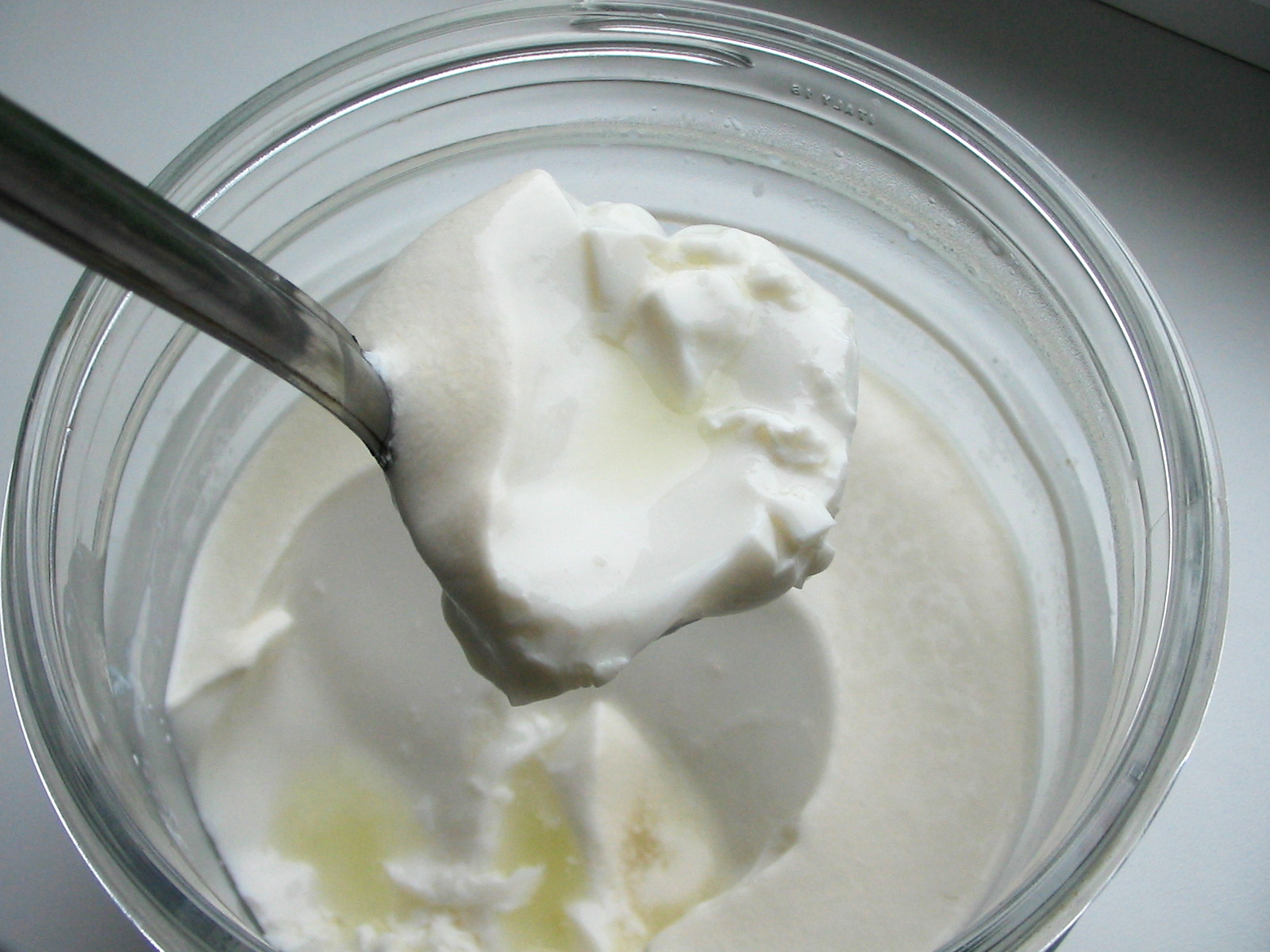
- Main ingredients: Milk

Clabber is a type of soured milk. It is produced by allowing unpasteurized milk to turn sour (ferment) at a specific humidity and temperature. Over time, the milk thickens or curdles into a yogurt-like consistency with a strong, sour flavor. According to Joy of Cooking, "Clabber... is milk that has soured to the stage of a firm curd but not to a separation of the whey."

Prior to the now-popular use of baking powder, clabber was used as a quick leavener in baking. Due to its stability, clabbered milk has been popular in areas without access to steady refrigeration.

With the rise of almost universal pasteurization of milk and the regulation of commercial sales of raw milk, the making of clabber virtually stopped because the bacteria needed to clabber the milk are killed through the pasteurization process. Buttermilk is the commercially available pasteurized product closest to clabber. A somewhat similar food can be made from pasteurized milk by adding vinegar or lemon juice to fresh milk, which causes it to curdle.

Clabber is sometimes a middle step in cheesemaking, such as for Uzbekistan's kurt, Polish twaróg and for some cultured cheeses.

== History ==
Clabber was brought to the American South by the Ulster Scots who settled in the Appalachian Mountains. Clabber is still sometimes referred to as bonny clabber (originally "bainne clábair" (thickened milk), from Gaelic bainne—milk, and clábair—sour milk or milk of the churn dash). Clabber passed into Scots and Hiberno-English dialects, meaning wet, gooey mud, though it is commonly used now in the noun form to refer to the food or in the verb form "to curdle".

In rural areas of the Southern United States, it was commonly eaten for breakfast with brown sugar, nutmeg, cinnamon, or molasses added. Some people also eat it with fruit or black pepper and cream.

Clabber was sometimes served with a specialized spoon. This is a serving utensil formed with the handle made at a 90-degree angle from the spoon bowl, to accommodate the manner in which clabber had to be ladled out of the container in which it formed.

== Similar foods ==
Similar foods are the South African amasi, German Dickmilch (thick milk), Scandinavian filmjölk, Finnish viili, Russian prostokvasha, Lithuanian rūgpienis, Latvian rūgušpiens, Polish zsiadłe mleko, and Hungarian aludttej.

== See also ==
- List of dairy products
- Quark (dairy product) – Acid-set cheese
- Clabber Girl – American brand of baking ingredients
