= Viili =

Nordic fermented milk product

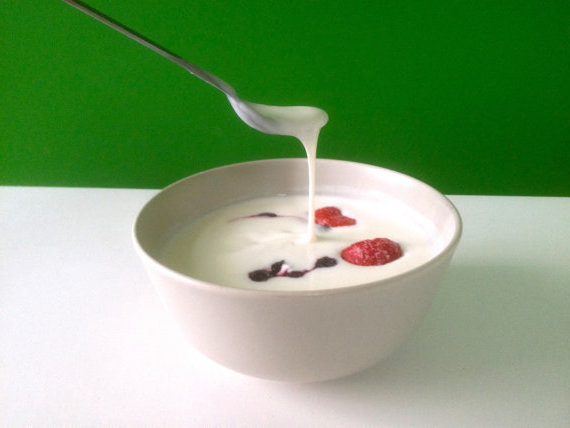
- Finnish viili with strawberries and blueberries
- Type: Fermented milk
- Place of origin: Nordic countries
- Main ingredients: Milk, bacterial and yeast culture

Viili (Finnish) or Fil (Swedish) is a mesophilic fermented milk product found in the Nordic countries, particularly Finland and Sweden. Viili is similar to yoghurt or kefir, but when left unmixed, its texture is malleable, or "long". The metabolism of the bacteria used in the fermentation also gives viili a slightly different taste.

This cultured milk snack resembles yoghurt and is the result of microbial action of lactic acid bacteria (LAB) and a surface-growing yeast-like fungus Geotrichum candidum present in milk, which forms a velvet-like surface on viili. In addition, most traditional viili cultures also contain yeast strains such as Kluveromyces marxianus and Pichia fermentans. The lactic acid bacteria identified in viili include the acid‐producing Lactococcus lactis subsp. lactis and L. l. cremoris as well as the aroma producers L. lactis subsp. lactis biovar diacetylactis and Leuconostoc mesenteroides. Among those mesophilic LAB strains, the slime-forming Lc. lactis subsp. cremoris produce a phosphate-containing heteropolysaccharide, named viilian. Viilian is similar to kefiran produced by kefir grains. The production of exopolysaccharides (EPS) by the strain forms the consistency character of viili and it has been claimed to have various functional benefits toward the rheological properties of milk products and the health improving potential.

In modern practice, pasteurized milk is used, fermentation is carried out in a dairy plant in controlled conditions using laboratory-grown cultures and the product sold fresh. Viili is widely available in Finland and Sweden in grocery stores in several variants, both natural and with berries or other flavors . In Sweden it is also common to have different LAB and yeast strains that give the Fil different tastes.

== Other variants ==
Several variants of fermented milk products are found in Western Finland and Sweden, such as filmjölk ("viili milk") or långfil ("long viili"), which vary in consistency and fermentation. In Norway, filmjölk is usually named "kulturmelk" ("cultured milk") or "surmelk" ("sour milk"), while in Gotland and Iceland, the name "skyr" is used to refer to fresh cheese that is eaten in ways similar to yoghurt variants. Additionally in Iceland "súrmjólk" is a local variant of filmjölk.

The Swedish variant most resembling viili is called filbunke.

Cream viili (Finnish: kermaviili) is made from cream instead of milk, and is used in cooking like sour cream, or with dill, chives and other spices as cold sauce for fish, or as a base for dip sauces.
