= Amasi =

Traditional Southern African fermented milk

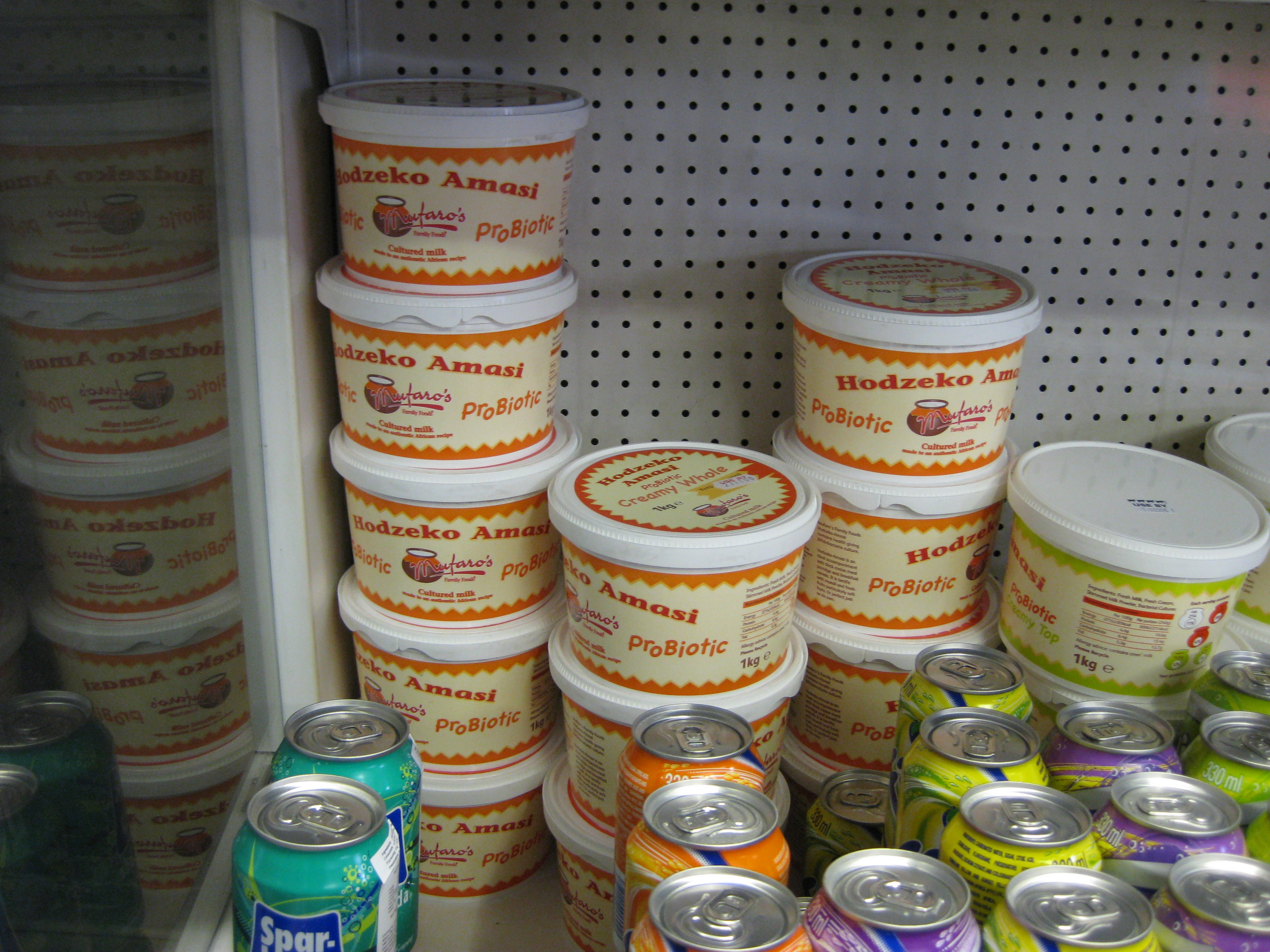
- Amasi in a supermarket fridge

Nutritional value per 100g
- Energy: 269 kJ (64 kcal)
- Carbohydrates: 3.68 g
- Sugars: 0 g
- Dietary fiber: 0 g
- Fat: 3.66 g
- Saturated: 2.35 g
- Monounsaturated: 1.09 g
- Polyunsaturated: 0.98 g
- Protein: 3.3 g
Vitamins and minerals
Vitamins	Quantity %DV^{†}
Vitamin A equiv.	4% 37.50 μg
Vitamin B12	17% 0.40 μg
Minerals	Quantity %DV^{†}
Calcium	12% 162 mg
Magnesium	3% 14.30 mg
Phosphorus	7% 92.20 mg
Potassium	6% 190 mg
Sodium	2% 56.70 mg
- Other constituents: Quantity
- Cholesterol: 9 mg
- ^{†}Percentages estimated using US recommendations for adults, except for potassium, which is estimated based on expert recommendation from the National Academies.

Amasi (in Ndebele, Zulu and Xhosa), emasi (in Swazi), maas (in Afrikaans), or mafi (in Sesotho), is a thick curdled sour fermented milk product that is sometimes compared to cottage cheese or plain yogurt but has a much stronger flavor. A staple food in pre-colonial times, it is now a popular snack in South Africa, Zimbabwe and Lesotho.

== Preparation ==
Amasi is traditionally prepared by storing unpasteurised cow's milk in a calabash container (Xhosa: iselwa, Zulu: igula) or hide sack to allow it to ferment. A calabash is smoked, then milk from the cow is put in a skin bag or bucket, where it ferments for 1 - 5 days, and acquires a sharp acidic taste. The fermenting milk develops a watery substance called umlaza, 'whey'; the remainder is amasi. This thick liquid is mostly poured over mealie meal porridge called pap (Xhosa: umphokoqo). It is traditionally served in a clay pot and it can also be drunk.

Commercially, amasi is produced using Lactococcus lactis, along with subspecies, Lactococcus lactis subsp. cremonis. The milk is first removed of impurities such as particulate matter, white blood cells and udder tissue cells. 3% skim milk powder and 0.5% gelatine is added to the raw milk to improve the nutritional value. The milk is then pasteurised at 72 °C for 15 seconds; then cooled at 30 °C to prevent thickening. Lactococcus lactis is then added at a level of 10^{6} cfu/ml and incubated at 30 °C for 16 to 24 hours.

== In culture ==
=== Zulu ===
Traditionally, Zulus believe that amasi makes a man strong, healthy, and desired. During "taboos", such as periods during menstruation or when a person has been in contact with death, the affected person must abstain from amasi. Milk is hardly ever drunk fresh, but it is sometimes used to thin amasi which is deemed too thick to be used.

=== South Africa ===
Nelson Mandela mentions how he cautiously left a friend's apartment (his hiding place in a "white" area when he was wanted by the Apartheid government) after he overheard two Zulu workers comment that it was strange to see milk on the window sill (left out to ferment) because whites seldom drank amasi.

Amasi is also popular in South African Indian cuisine where it is used similarly to curd.

=== Xhosa ===
In the Xhosa culture, a bride is served amasi and a piece of meat, which is called uTsiki, as a sign of being welcomed into her new family.

== See also ==
- Mursik
