= Buttermilk =

Fermented dairy drink

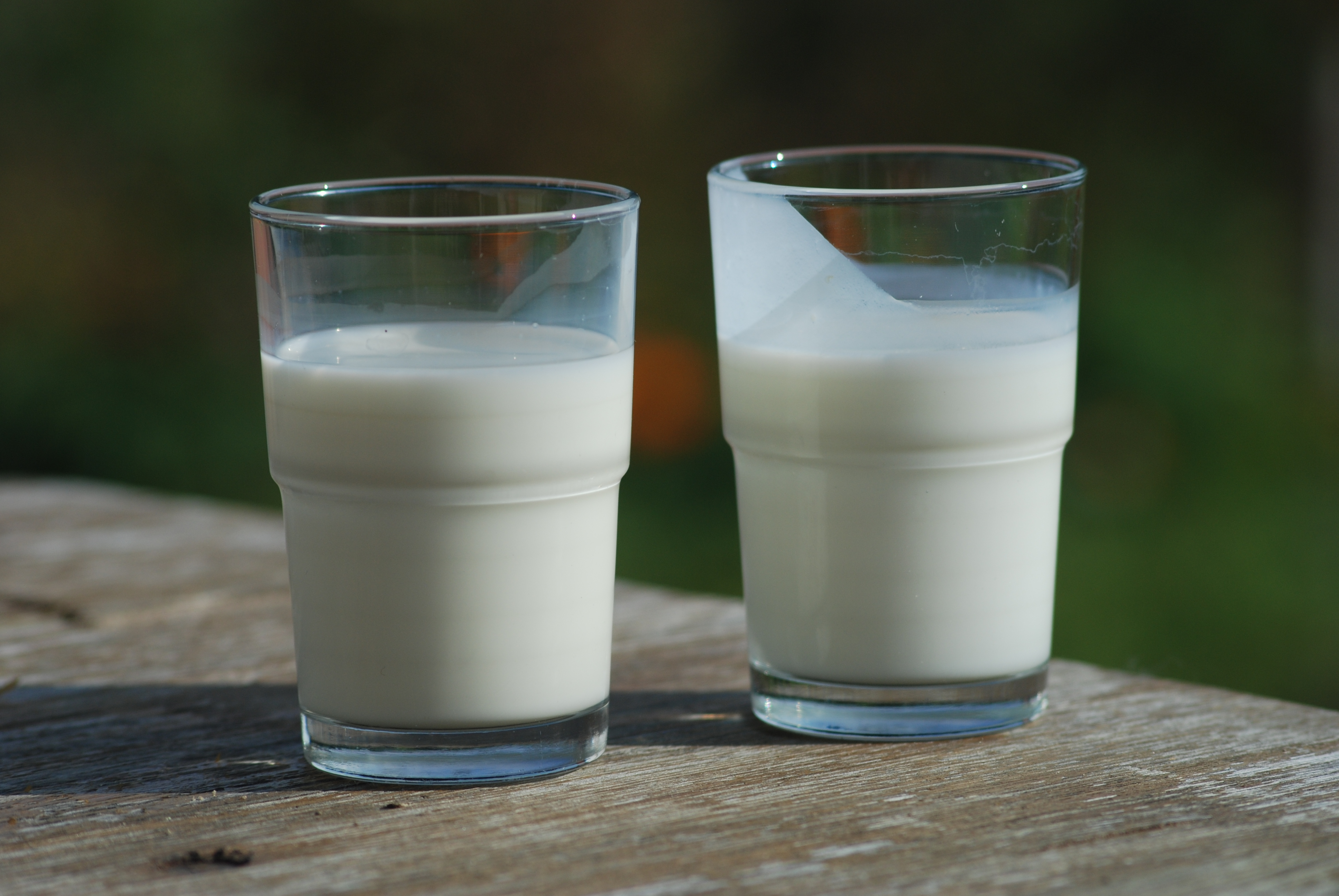
- Milk (left) compared with fermented buttermilk (right), which is thicker and leaves a visible residue on the glass
- Course: Beverage
- Serving temperature: Chilled
- Main ingredients: Cream
- Food energy (per 100 g (ml) serving): 62 kcal (260 kJ)

Buttermilk is a dairy drink made by adding lactic acid bacteria to milk to produce a fermented dairy drink. Traditionally, it was made from the nearly fat-free milk remaining after churning butter from cream, which was cultured with natural bacteria prior to and during churning, giving a slight sour taste to the buttermilk and preventing spoilage. However, with the ubiquity of refrigeration in industrialized countries, butter in those areas is typically made from uncultured or "sweet" cream. Therefore, most modern buttermilk is specifically produced by inoculating fresh, pasteurized milk, and is available in different levels of fat content.

Buttermilk is consumed as a beverage and used in cooking. Drinking buttermilk remains common in warmer climates where unrefrigerated milk sours quickly, as the fermentation prevents further spoilage. In making soda bread, the acid in fermented buttermilk reacts with the leavening agent, sodium bicarbonate (baking soda), to produce carbon dioxide. Buttermilk is used in marination, especially for chicken and pork.

== Traditional buttermilk ==
Buttermilk originated before the advent of refrigeration and homogenization, when fresh raw milk was left to stand for a period of time to allow the cream to separate to the top. During the separation period, naturally occurring lactic acid-producing bacteria in the milk ferment it, which facilitates the butter churning process, because fat from cream with a lower pH coalesces more readily than that of fresh cream. As this acidic environment also helps prevent potentially harmful microorganisms from growing, spoilage is delayed. This traditional method is susceptible to spoilage during the fermenting and churning processes, particularly under poor hygiene standards and when it is not kept cool. Refrigeration and the use of fresh milk in near-aseptically clean dairies largely eliminated these problems.

Traditional buttermilk is still common in many households across South Asia, the Middle East, and various parts of Europe but is seldom found in other Western countries. In Arab culture, buttermilk is commonly sold ice cold with other dairy products and often consumed during Ramadan for iftar and suhur, while in the Indian subcontinent, it may be served with roasted maize.

== Cultured buttermilk ==
Commercially available cultured buttermilk is produced in the same way as yogurt, where fresh milk that has been pasteurized and homogenized, is then inoculated with a culture of Lactococcus lactis or Lactobacillus bulgaricus that produces the lactic acid that sours and thickens the milk, plus Leuconostoc mesenteroides subsp. cremoris to enhance the buttery quality, so as to simulate the naturally occurring bacteria in the traditional product. The lactic acid is the product of the bacteria fermenting lactose, the primary sugar in milk. As the bacteria produce lactic acid, the pH of the milk decreases and casein, the primary milk protein, precipitates, causing the curdling or clabbering of milk, making cultured buttermilk thicker than plain milk. While both traditional and cultured buttermilk contain lactic acid, traditional buttermilk is thinner than cultured buttermilk.

=== United States ===
Cultured buttermilk was first commercially introduced in the United States in the 1920s. It was widely used in baking, and as a beverage that became popular among immigrants from Eastern Europe. It reached peak annual sales of 517,000,000 kg (1.14×10^{9} lb) in 1960. Consumption of buttermilk has declined since then, and annual sales in 2012 reached less than half that number. However, condensed buttermilk and dried buttermilk remain common in the food industry. Liquid buttermilk is used primarily in the commercial preparation of baked goods and cheese. Buttermilk solids are used in ice cream manufacturing, as well as being added to pancake mixes to make buttermilk pancakes. Home cooks can use powdered buttermilk to give baked goods a higher rise, add tang to dips, marinades, and rubs without thinning them out, and as a topping for fruits and vegetables. A niche use is as a creamer for coffee, which imparts a tang some enjoy.

== Nutrition ==
Whole buttermilk
Nutritional value per 100 g (3.5 oz)
- Energy: 62 kcal (260 kJ)
- Carbohydrates: 4.9 g
- Sugars: 4.9 g
- Fat: 3.3 g
- Protein: 3.2 g
Vitamins and minerals
Vitamins	Quantity %DV^{†}
Thiamine (B1)	4% 0.047 mg
Riboflavin (B2)	13% 0.172 mg
Niacin (B3)	1% 0.09 mg
Pantothenic acid (B5)	8% 0.38 mg
Vitamin B6	2% 0.036 mg
Folate (B9)	1% 5 μg
Vitamin B12	19% 0.46 μg
Vitamin C	0% 0 mg
Minerals	Quantity %DV^{†}
Calcium	9% 115 mg
Iron	0% 0.03 mg
Magnesium	2% 10 mg
Manganese	0% 0.004 mg
Phosphorus	7% 85 mg
Potassium	5% 135 mg
Sodium	5% 105 mg
Zinc	3% 0.38 mg
- Other constituents: Quantity
- Water: 88 g
- Link to Full Report from USDA Database
- ^{†}Percentages estimated using US recommendations for adults, except for potassium, which is estimated based on expert recommendation from the National Academies.

Traditional buttermilk has only trace levels of fat – less than 0.5 percent. Modern commercially produced buttermilk made with whole milk is 88% water, 3% protein, 3% fat, and 5% carbohydrates (see table). In a reference amount of 100 g (3.5 oz) (100 ml), whole buttermilk provides 62 calories of food energy, and is a moderate source of vitamin B_{12} (19% DV) and riboflavin (13% DV, table).

Nutritional values per 100 ml (3.5 imp fl oz; 3.4 US fl oz)	Whole buttermilk	Low-fat buttermilk	Skimmed milk	Whole milk
Food energy	62 calories (260 J)	43 calories (180 J)	35 calories (150 J)	61 calories (260 J)
% Total fat	3.3	1.1	0.2	3.2
% Protein	3.2	3.5	3.4	3.3
% Sugars	4.9	4.8	4.9	4.6

== Acidified buttermilk ==
Acidified buttermilk or acidulated buttermilk is a substitute made by adding a food-grade acid, such as distilled white vinegar or lemon juice, to milk and letting it stand for about 10 minutes until it curdles. (About 15 millilitres (0.5 imperial fluid ounces; 0.5 US fluid ounces) of acid is added 200 to 250 ml (7 to 9 imp fl oz; 7 to 8 US fl oz) of milk.) Milk with any amount of fat can be used, but whole milk is usually used for baking.

== See also ==
- List of dairy products
- Butterfat, the fatty portion from which butter is made
- Creole cream cheese, traditional Louisiana cream cheese made from buttermilk
- Curd, a dairy product obtained by coagulating milk
- Soured milk, denotes a range of food products produced by the acidification of milk
