= Soured milk =

Milk-based food product

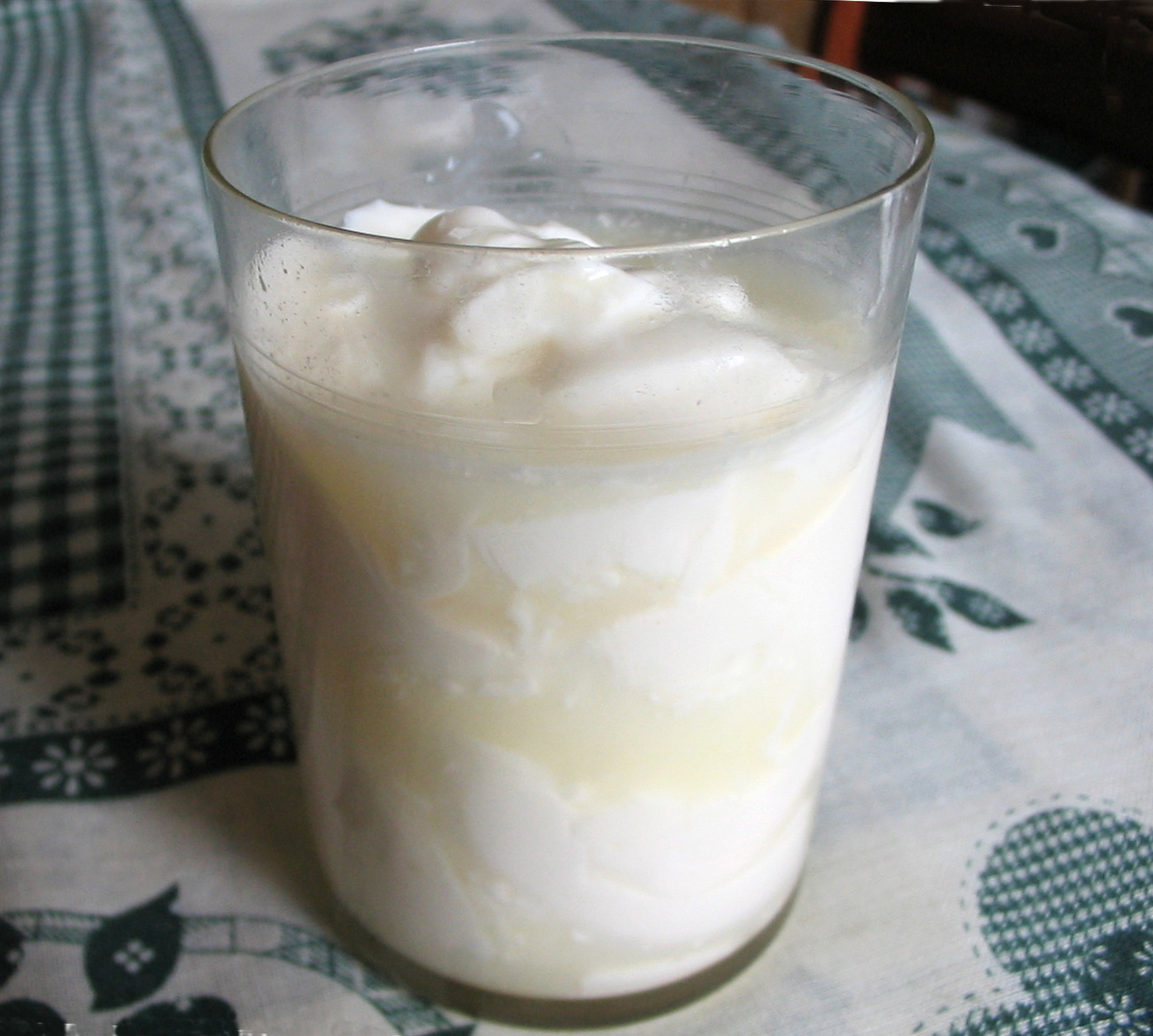
- Russian prostokvasha and Ukrainian kysliak, traditional fermented milk
- Main ingredients: Milk

Soured milk, sour milk, spontaneously soured milk, or naturally soured milk is the milk product fermented with indigenous microorganisms (chiefly mesophilic lactic acid bacteria), as opposed to cultured milk, of which the production involves controlled fermentation with starter cultures. Lactic acid produced by the bacteria brings tart taste and causes milk to coagulate and thicken, inhibiting the growth of harmful bacteria and improving the product's shelf life. It is unlike "spoiled milk" and is historically used for culinary, nutritional and preservation purposes in many cultures.

Examples include amasi from southern Africa, clabber from Ireland, aludttej from Hungary, Dickmilch (thick milk) and Herbstmilch (autumn milk) from Germany, gruševina from Yugoslavia, rūgpienis from Lithuania, prostokvasha from Russia, laban rayeb from Egypt, maziwa lala from Kenya and Piimä from Finland.

== In recipes ==
Raw milk that has not gone sour is sometimes referred to as "sweet milk", because it contains the sugar lactose and lacks lactic acid. Fermentation converts the lactose to lactic acid, which has a sour flavor. Before the invention of refrigeration, raw milk commonly became sour before it could be consumed, and various recipes incorporate such leftover milk as an ingredient.

== See also ==
- Filmjölk – Traditional Swedish fermented milk product
- Acid-set cheese – Cheese set by souring
