= Sarbhaja =

Bengali milk sweet

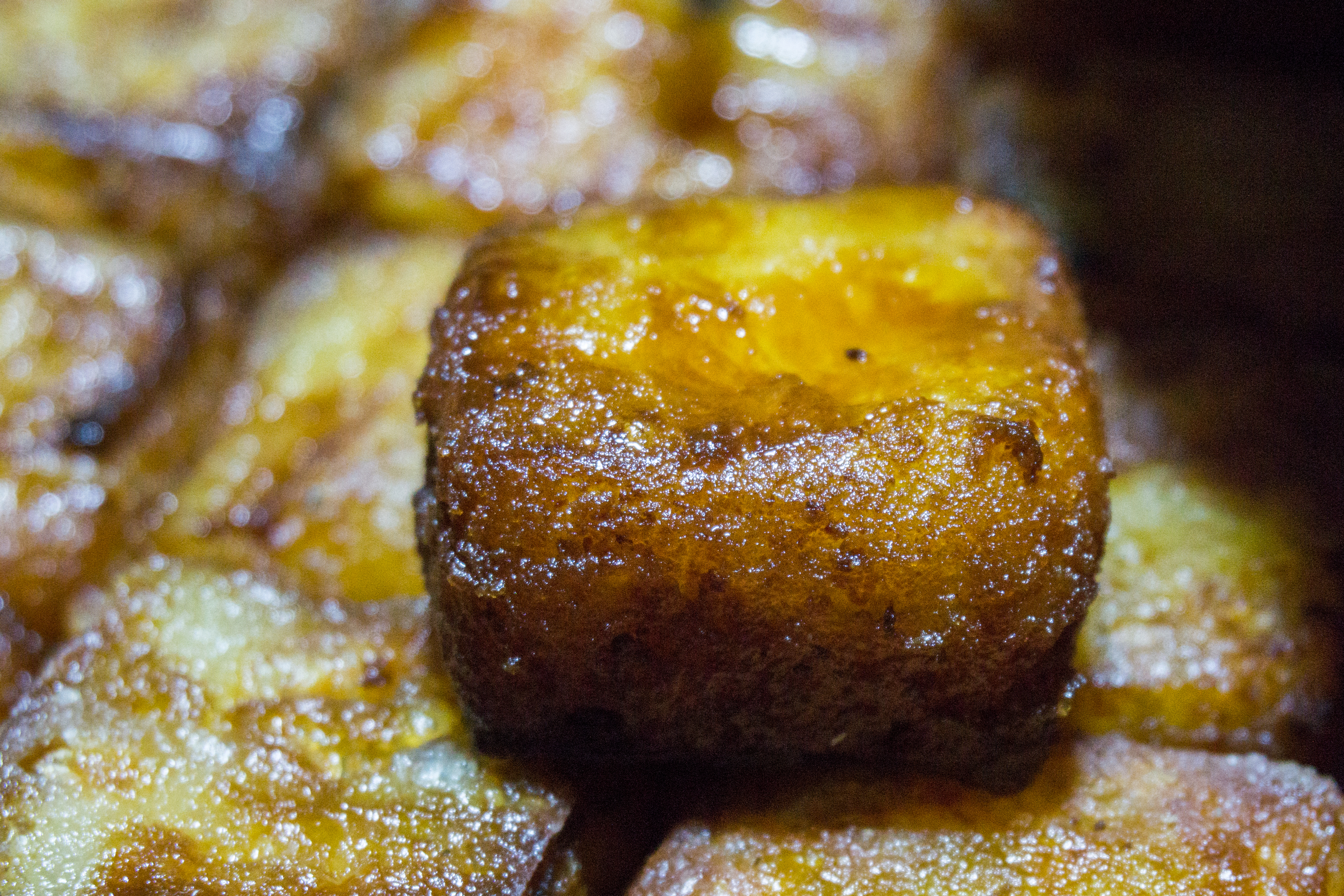
- Sarbhaja of Krishnanagar
- Course: Dessert
- Place of origin: Krishnanagar
- Region or state: West Bengal
- Associated cuisine: Bengali cuisine
- Main ingredients: Sar, Kheer and Ghee
- Similar dishes: Sarpuria

A Sarbhaja (Bengali: সরভাজা pronounced [Sɔrbʱaza]) is a milk based sweet originating from West Bengal, which is one of the famous Bengali sweets. The sweet's name comes from sar, the surface creamy layer of milk which is its main ingredient, and the word Bhaja refers to the frying of the sar. The Sarbhaja uses cow's milk and ghee is used for frying. It is fried until golden brown in color. This sweet made from milk is famous throughout Bengal.

Although the sweet gained popularity in the first decade of the 20th century, its earliest mention is in the 15th century Chaitanya Charitamrita. In 1902, Adharchandra Das opened a sweet shop in Krishnanagar, and the shop became famous for its Sarpuria and Sarbhaja. As per the Hindu custom, it is customary to take sweets for the members of the household on Vijaya or other festive occasions; the Krishnanagarik or Krishnanagarians have a tradition of taking Sarbhaja as a sweet.

== Ingredients and preparation ==
Traditional Sarbhaja is usually made from milk, ghee, and sugar (powdered). Depending on the recipe, some other ingredients may be added to these ingredients such as cinnamon, cardamom.

Sar is made using traditional techniques from pure cow's milk, the Ghoshes—businessman of milk products—of Krishnanagar mainly supply the milk. Fresh milk is thoroughly boiled in a semi-flat iron koṛāi (pan) using dry cow dung cake flame. Half an hour is required to form a rich foam on the boiling milk surface, during which the ladle or wooden stick is stirred in the boiling milk. The low heat of red burn dry dung cake make the milk to condense and a thick foamy layer of milk fat accumulates on the surface; it is called sar. The sars used in Sarbhaja are usually 7 to 9 inches in diameter. About 400 milliliters of milk is required to produce a 9-inch diameter sar. The sar is collected from the karai and placed on a piece of cotton cloth to cool; about 2 to 3 hours are required for cooling. Sarbhaja preparation requires another dairy product called kheer, which is made by boiling milk. To make kheer, fresh cow's milk is boiled for half an hour and stirred continuously with a ladle to obtain concentrated form of mnilk called kheer in pest form. Sugar is added while boiling the milk.

The sars and kheer prepared from milk are arranged in successive layers. In this process kheer is spread over a piece of sar and covered with another layer of sar, thus keeping 3-5 layers of sar and kheer. This layered sar and kheer material known as kacha Sarbhaja (raw Sarbhaja). Kacha Sarbhaja is cut into square shape pieces with the help of a knife. Kacha Sarbhaja pieces are fried until they turn light golden-brown in color, using pure ghee for frying. After frying, the fried pieces of Sarbhaja need to be cooled. The pieces of hot Sarbhaja are cooled on a wooden plate.

== Bibliography ==
- Gope, Nitya Ranjan (25 May 2017). "FORM GI-1 of Krishnagar Sarbhaja". Intellectual Property India.
