= Milk skin =

Film of protein forming on dairy milk

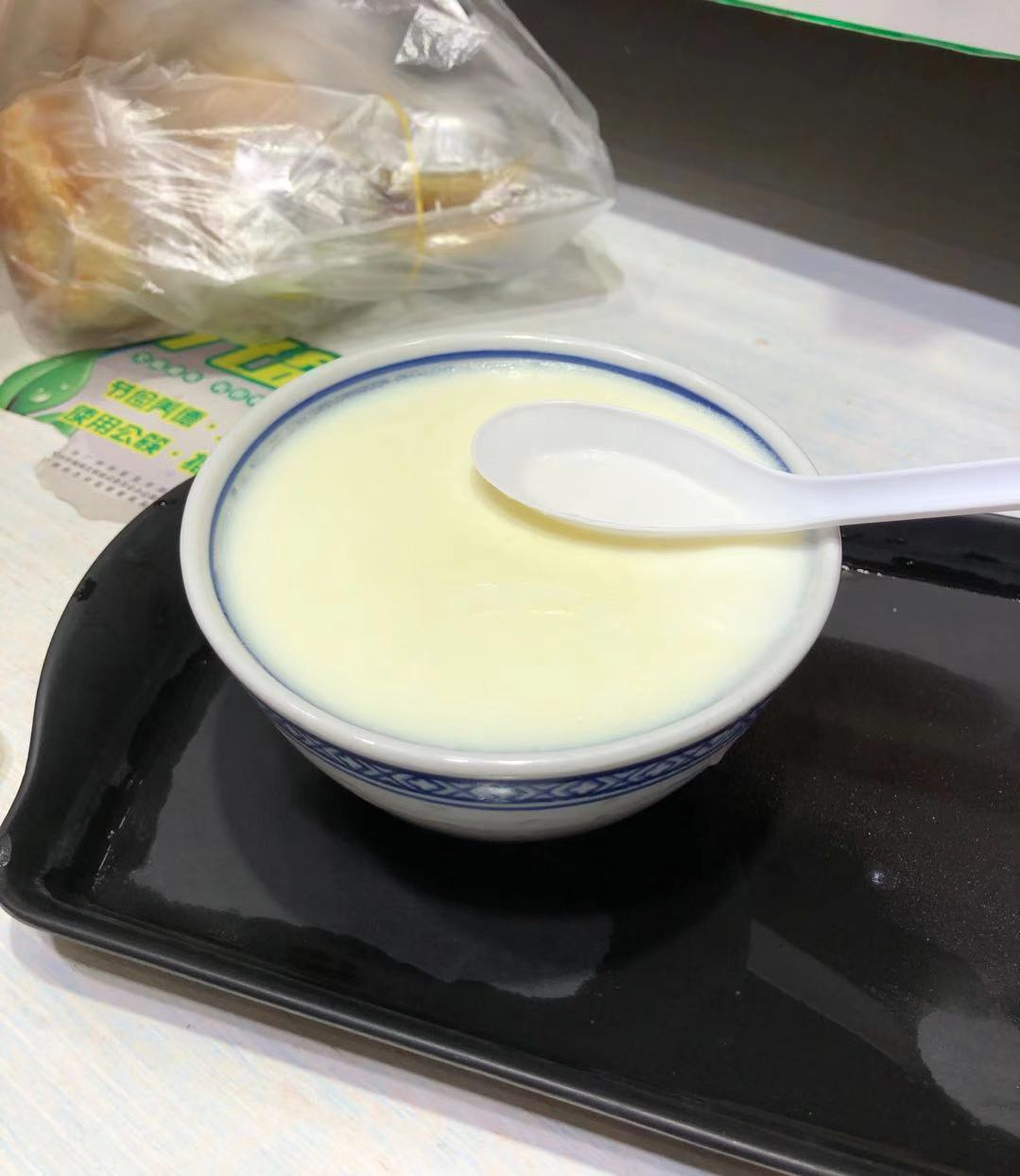
Double skin milk

Milk skin or lactoderm is a sticky film of protein that forms on top of dairy milk and foods containing dairy milk (such as hot chocolate and some soups). Milk skin, or the lactoderm can be produced both through conventional boiling and by microwaving the liquid, and as such can often be observed when heating milk for use in drinks such as drinking chocolate. It is caused by the denaturation of proteins such as beta-lactoglobulin (whey protein). The strong thickness of the skin varies dependent on a number of factors, including the temperature of the milk, the shape of the container, and the amount of milk in the container.

When milk is boiled, soluble milk proteins are denatured and then coagulate with milk's fat and form a sticky film across the top of the liquid, which then dries by evaporation. The layer does not need to be discarded and can be consumed, as protein's nutritional value is unaffected by the denaturation process. Milk film is often considered to be desirable and is used in several recipes for various foods. However, this is dependent on culture. The cream is no longer so commonly found on retailed milk, as milk is more commonly homogenised.

== In various cultures ==
=== Albania ===
In Albanian, milk skin is called "mazë". It is used in various traditional dishes, the most famous of which is Flija. Flija is found all around the regions traditionally inhabited by Albanians including Kosovo, regions of North Macedonia, Serbia and Montenegro.

=== Bangladesh ===
Milk skin is typically known as "śōr" (Bengali: সর) in Bangladesh. It is used to make tea and milk dishes rich in taste and consistency.

=== China ===
Milk skin is called nǎi pí (奶皮) in Chinese. Considered to be of high nutritional value, Milk skin is often made into various desserts and delicacies. Milk skin is also favoured in regions such as Inner Mongolia and Tibet, as milk products are of more importance in regular diet. Double skin milk (雙皮奶) is a Cantonese dessert developed in Shunde that has milk skin on the surface.

=== Cyprus ===
In Cyprus, milk skin in called tsippa and is used as a filling for a pastry called tsippopitta (τσιππόπιτα, literally "milk-skin pie").

=== France ===
In France, a type of rice pudding called teurgoule employs an extreme version of lactoderm where the milk-containing dish is left to cook for many hours.

=== India ===
The upper part of milk is also referred to as kene (ಕೆನೆ) in Kannada, Karnataka, aadai (ஆடை) in Tamil, Tamil Nadu. There are various other regional references to milk skin too, like saay (साय) in Marathi, malai (मलाई) in Hindi, paada (പാൽപ്പാട) in Malayalam, thari in Khandeshi, "meegada" in Telugu, "Baave" (pron: Baa-way) in Tulu (Coastal Karnataka), "chhali" in Bihar, Eastern UP & Jharkhand. In West Bengal, it is called sor (দুধের সর), a Bengali word. Sarpuria and Sarbhaja are the two sweets of Krishnanagar, West Bengal. It is also often spread on slices of bread, as a substitute for butter.

=== Iran ===
In Iran it is called sarshir (Persian: سرشیر) literally meaning "top of the milk". It is used as a breakfast dish, usually mixed with honey or jam and spread on flat bread.

=== Japan ===
In Japan, a dairy product called "so" was made from layers of milk skin during the 7th-10th centuries. So was further processed to make "daigo". The dairy usage in Japan dwindled during the Heian era, and the technique was later adopted to produce yuba from soy milk.

=== Kenya ===
In Kenya, milk skin is called Maamalteet among the Kalenjin and is either used while cooking to thicken the sauces and stews or as a first step in making a wispy form of clarified butter and a fried milk protein (typically added to vegetable stir-fries).

=== Nepal ===
In Nepal this skin is referred to as tar [t̪ʌr] or chhali [t͡sʰali] and many people enjoy consuming the skin along with the milk. Some people prefer to use in making curd for it produces higher amount of "nauni" [nʌu̯ni] (butter) while stirred with the help of "madani".

=== Pakistan ===
In Pakistan, milk skin is called "ملائی" ("malai.") However, "malai" actually means cream. The milk skin is sometimes confused with the layer of cream which rises to the top of whole, untoned, unhomogenised milk as it cools.

=== Poland ===
In Poland, milk skin is called "kożuch", which is used in reference to any hardened layer of liquid, but can also be translated as a "sheepskin coat".

=== Russia ===
The milk skin is referred to as "penka" ("little foam") in Russian, and is infamous as the least favorite thing among children, but is used as an ingredient in some haute cuisine dishes like Guryev porridge. The skin that forms on baked milk is higher regarded and is preferred for those dishes.

=== Romania ===
In Romania, milk skin is called "caimac".

=== Saudi Arabia ===
In Saudi Arabia, milk skin is called "جلالة”.

=== Serbia ===
In Serbia, milk skin is collected (usually in wooden vessels), salted and left to lightly ferment. The product is called kajmak.

=== Turkey ===
In Turkey, milk skin is called kaymak and is consumed traditionally at breakfasts or in Turkish desserts. Bal-kaymak (literally "honey-milk skin") on top of a slice of bread is also popular.

=== Uganda ===
In Uganda, milk skin is called "lububi”.

=== Somalia ===
In Somalia milk skin is called "labeen".

=== Spain, Portugal, Latin America ===
In many countries with Portuguese or Spanish ancestry, "milk skin" is translated as "nata", and lends itself to many baked goods and foodstuffs.

== See also ==
- Double skin milk
- List of dairy products
- Tofu skin, a similar product made from soy milk
