= Kalvdans =

Scandinavian milk dessert

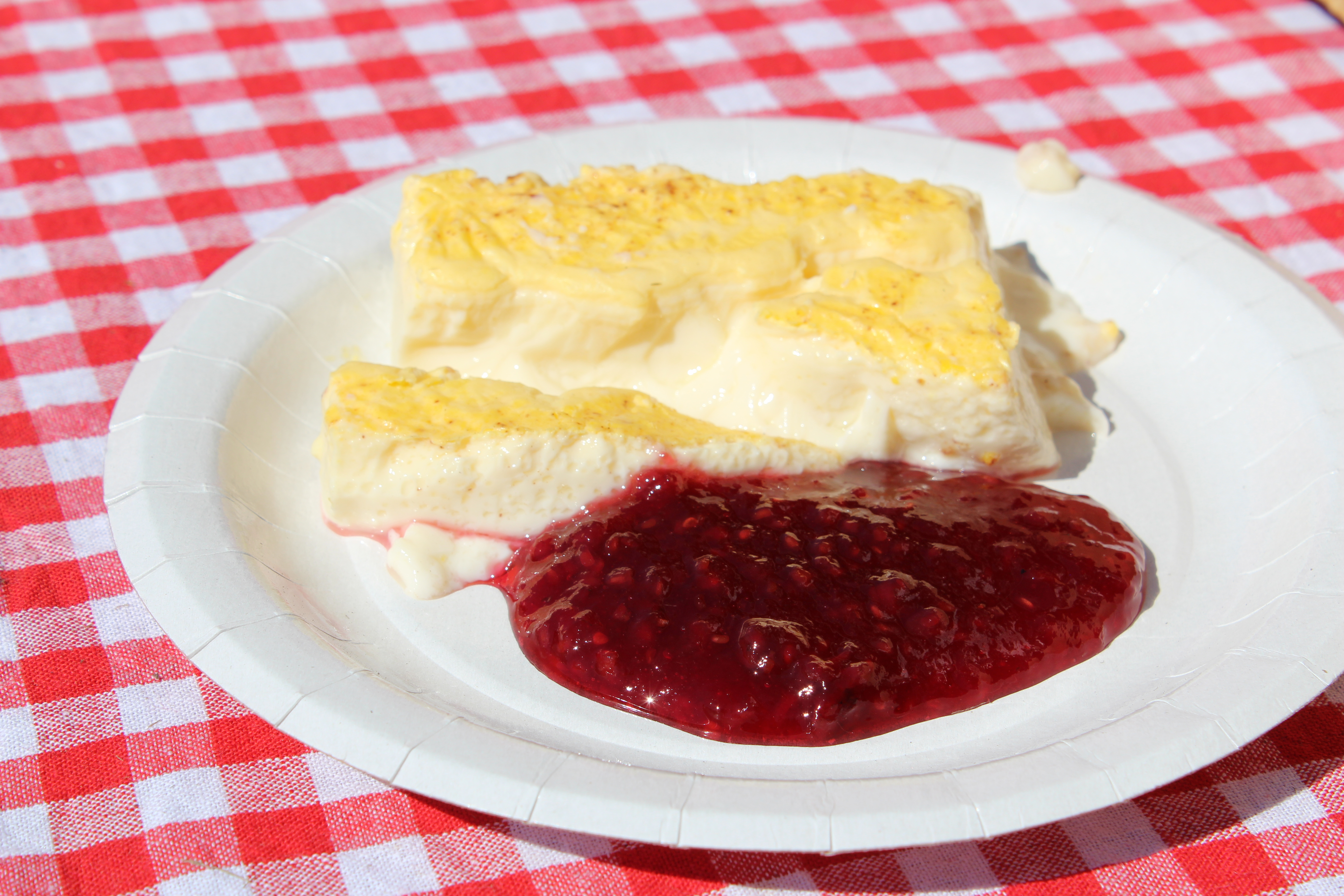
- Type: Dessert
- Place of origin: Scandinavia
- Main ingredients: Colostrum milk, water

Kalvdans (lit. 'calf dance') is a classical Scandinavian dessert. It is made from unpasteurized colostrum milk, the first milk produced by a cow after giving birth.

Kalvdans has a long tradition in Swedish cuisine. It is mentioned in the encyclopedia Project af swensk grammatica from 1682. The encyclopedia mentions kalvost (lit. 'calf-cheese') as an alternative name. The name kalvdans refers to the jiggly pudding-like consistency of the dessert. Swedish emigrants brought the tradition of kalvdans to North America, as well. It is however rarely consumed today, as very few families keep cows of their own.

In preparing the dessert, the colostrum milk is mixed with water and cautiously heated. Due to the high levels of protein in the colostrum milk, it coagulates and hardens when boiled (much like eggs do). Thus the dessert gets a pudding-like consistency.

Due to Swedish health regulations, unpasteurized milk may only be sold directly from the farms. Thus the capacity to produce kalvdans is somewhat limited. As a consequence kalvdans is very rarely prepared in Swedish households today. In 2008 kalvdans, along with four other Swedish dishes, was included in the 'Ark of Taste' of the Slow Food movement.

A related dessert is råmjölkspannkaka (raw-milk pancake). Similar desserts like kalvdans exists in other countries. In Iceland, a pudding called ábrystir is made out of colostrum milk. A similar Finnish version is called uunijuusto (oven cheese). In England colostrum milk, or beestings as it is called locally, was traditionally used for puddings. In India kharvas is a dessert made out of colostrum milk from buffaloes. In Norwegian and Danish dialects, the word kalvedans sometimes refers to a type of jelly made by veal meat.

== See also ==
- List of desserts
