= Gombe =

Gombe may refer to:

== Places ==
- Gombe State, Nigeria
  - Gombe, Nigeria, the capital of Gombe State, Nigeria
- Gombe, Angola
- Gombe, Butambala, the capital of Butambala District in Central Uganda
- Gombe, Wakiso, a town in Wakiso District, Central Uganda
- Gombe, Kinshasa, in the Democratic Republic of the Congo
- Gömbe, Kaş, a community in the Turkish Riviera

== People ==
- Christian Gombe (born 1962), Central African Republic basketball player
- Kabiru Gombe, Nigerian Islamic teacher under izalah
- Samson Gombe (1938–1989), Kenyan scientist and professor
- Momee Gombe, Hausa actress and musician

== Other uses ==
- Cyclone Gombe, a 2022 tropical cyclone in Africa
- Gombe (dish), a traditional Norwegian dish
- Gombey, a dance from Bermuda (sometimes spelt Gombe)

== See also ==
- Gombe Stream National Park, in Tanzania, where Jane Goodall pioneered her behavioral research on the chimpanzee
