= List of Finnish desserts =

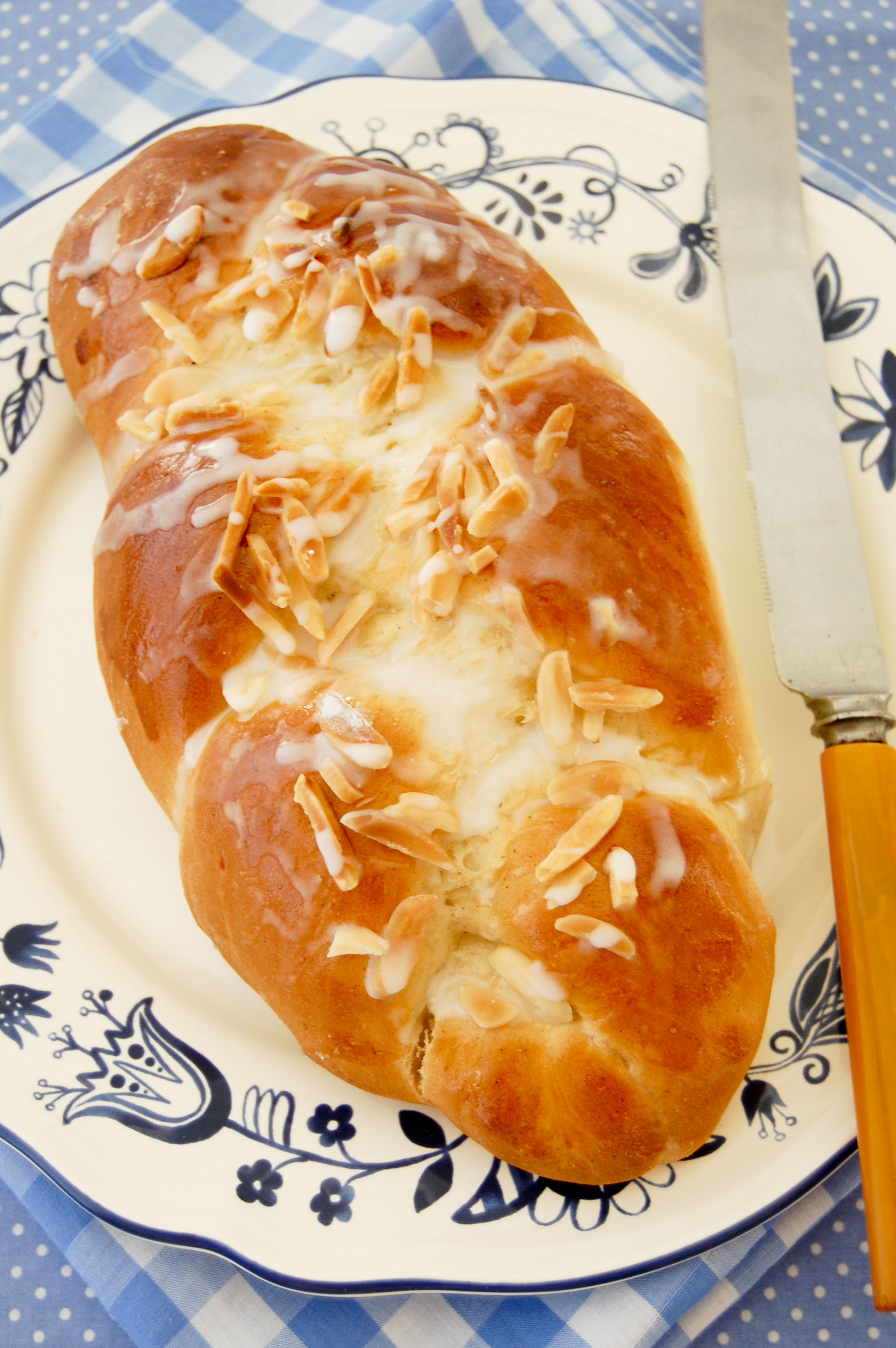
Pulla is a sweet, Finnish cardamom bread with a rich warm flavour

This is a list of notable Finnish sweets and desserts. The cuisine of Finland refers to food preparation originating from Finland or having played a great historic part in Finnish cuisine. Finland also shares many dishes and influences with surrounding Scandinavian countries, such as Norway, Sweden, and Denmark, as well as Russia.

== Characteristics ==
Finnish desserts are mainly influenced by berries and fruits that can be grown in colder climates, such as bilberries, lingonberries, cloudberries, and strawberries. Wholemeal flour such as rye and potato flour are also common. It is also influenced by Russian dishes and Eastern European culture, specifically Fennoscandian and Western Russian influences. Desserts tend to be rather plain and simple, yet hearty, and frequently served with cream, berries, and nuts.

== Finnish desserts ==
Name	Image	Description
Pulla		Sweet, cardamom-flavored bread eaten with coffee or as dessert
Korvapuustit		Pulla rolled in cinnamon and sugar
Kiisseli		Water, sugar, berry juice and berries (nowadays often canned or frozen) thickened with potato starch flour, served with milk/cream and sugar.
Runeberg torte		Tort flavored with rum and almonds, then filled with raspberry jam
Uunijuusto		Baked milk dish eaten with berries
Vispipuuro		Sweet pink dessert porridge with lingonberries or other berries, served with milk and sugar
Salmiakki		Salty liquorice candy
Terva Leijona		Candy flavored with wood tar
Mustikkapiirakka		Blueberry-flavored dessert made with sour cream custard and rye flour
Mämmi		Made of rye flour, malted rye, salt, water and orange zest. Served with vanilla sauce
Joulutorttu		Ring-shaped pastry filled with ricotta and prunes
Rönttönen		Open-faced rye or barley pie with sweetened mashed potato and lingonberry filling
Sultsina		Pastry with a thick, flatbread-like texture, typically filled with rice pudding or porridge
Piparkakku		Gingerbread flavored with cinnamon, ginger, cloves and cardamom
Tippaleipä		Fried dough topped with powdered sugar, typically served during May Day
Laskiaispulla		Sweet roll filled with raspberry jam, whipped cream, and topped with powdered sugar
Leipäjuusto		A soft cheese often served with cloudberry jam (lakkahillo) and or coffee
Voisilmäpulla		Butter bun with filling made from butter, cardamom, sugar and vanilla
Munkki		Finnish doughnut flavored with cardamom
Köyhät ritarit		Day-old French bread dipped in a cardamom-cinnamon spiced milk-egg mixture, then fried on either side and served with cream and berries
Lörtsy		Fried, moon-shaped pastry filled with jam, cream, or rice
Mansikkakakku		Traditional meringue strawberry cake prepared with mixed strawberries, sugar, egg whites, heavy cream, vanilla and almonds. Typically served during midsummer
Pasha		Dessert made from quark, curd and cottage cheese flavored with raisins. Served during Easter and originating from Russia
Ålandspannkaka		Oven pancake traditionally made with semolina and flavoured with cardamom originating from the Swedish-speaking Åland Islands
Mokkapalat		Brownies or sponge cake topped with chocolate icing and sprinkles

== Gallery ==
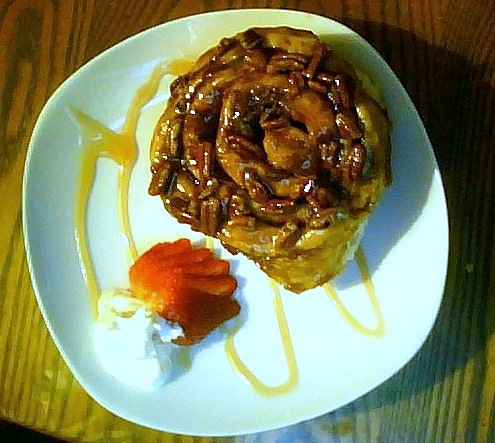
Korvapuusti with caramelized pecans

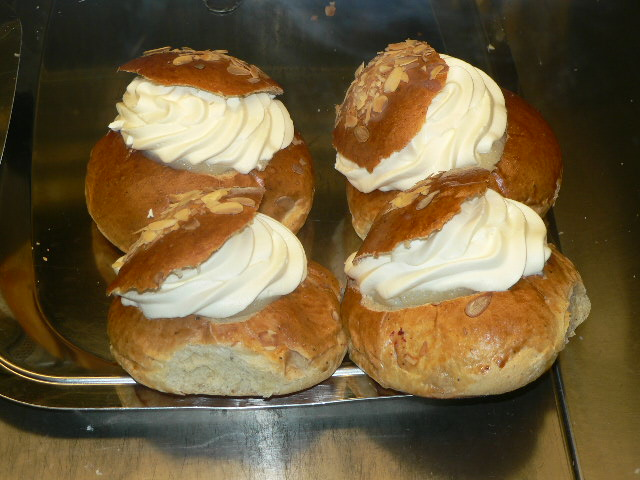
Four laskiaispulla on a tray

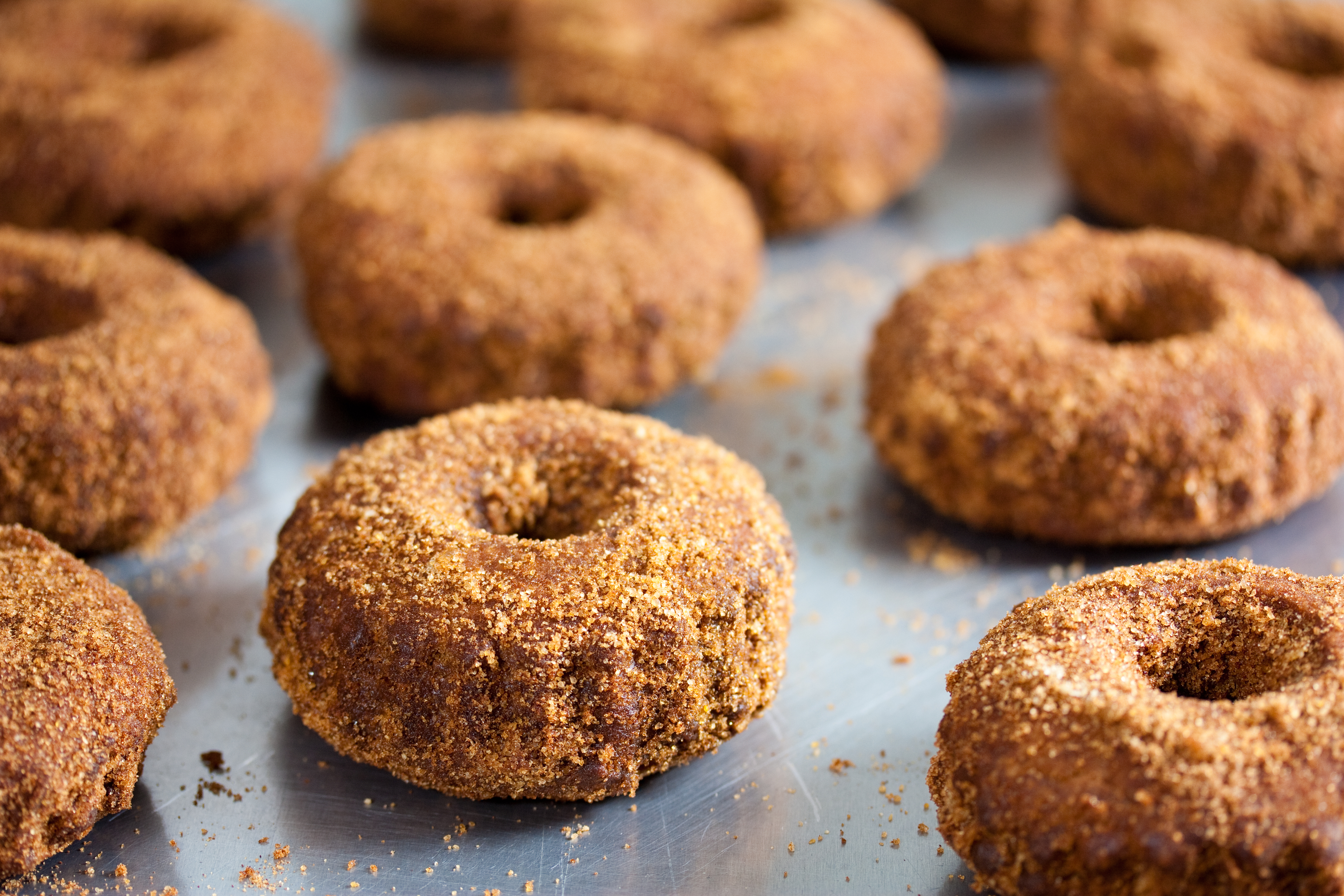
Munkki (doughnuts) being prepared

== See also ==
- Finnish cuisine
- List of desserts
