= Blaand =

Fermented milk product made from whey

Blaand, or bland (Shaetlan pronunciation: [blaːnd] BLAND) is a fermented milk product made from whey. It is acidic and has very low alcohol content.

Blaand has been a traditional drink made by farmers for their own use in Scotland, Iceland, the Faroes, and Norway for centuries. It was never commercialized; production ended in the mid-20th century. In these areas it was the most common daily drink before the introduction of modern drinks like tea and coffee.

Blaand could be made by diluting the whey with water first and then letting it sour.

Another approach was to put the whey into great vats, where it was left to sour; before drinking, some of the soured whey was mixed with water to reduce the acidity. The Norwegian name, "blande," simply means "mix," and the Scots word can mean the same.

== See also ==
- Kumis
- List of dairy products
- List of fermented foods
