= List of countries by milk consumption per capita =

This is a list of countries ordered by annual per capita consumption of milk, excluding butter.

Rank	Change in rank 2013/2007	Country	Milk consumption 2013 (kg/capita/yr)	Milk consumption 2007 (kg/capita/yr)
1	Steady	Finland	430.76	361.19
2	▲2	Albania	351.72	277.52
3	▲4	Montenegro	349.21	305.87
4	Steady	Netherlands	341.47	320.15
5	▼2	Sweden	341.23	355.86
6	▼1	Switzerland	318.69	315.78
7	▲1	Lithuania	295.46	273.87
8	▲10	Ireland	291.86	247.17
9	▲3	Kazakhstan	288.12	262.61
10	▲11	Estonia	284.85	238.86
11	▼4	Denmark	277.3	295.62
12	▲1	Norway	261.34	261.52
13	▲4	Germany	258.7	247.24
14	▲9	Austria	258.09	235.11
15	▼6	Luxembourg	255.3	265.9
16	▼11	Greece	255.26	314.69
17	▼1	United States	254.69	253.8
18	▼3	Italy	246.88	256.1
19	▼5	France	241.31	260.48
20	▼10	Romania	238.33	266.19
21	▲1	Belgium	236.19	238.47
22	▼3	Slovenia	235.01	246.44
23	▲1	Australia	234.49	230.92
24	▼4	United Kingdom	232.2	241.47
25	▲2	Croatia	231.02	217.52
26	▼1	Iceland	225.82	223.68
27	▲10	Kyrgyzstan	210.92	179.28
28	▲16	Uruguay	210.54	163.26
29	▲28	Armenia	209.03	136.12
30	▲3	Poland	205.39	198.51
31	▼5	Portugal	205.04	222.94
32	▲2	Czech Republic	195.2	195.47
33	▼5	Argentina	195.08	213.1
34	▲21	Turkey	193.94	138.71
35	▲3	Israel	193.6	178.33
36	▼1	Malta	190.06	188.64
37	▼7	Canada	187.77	206.83
38	▲2	Costa Rica	183.28	176.29
39	▲8	Pakistan	183.13	159.0
40	▼11	Latvia	174.11	208.66
41	▼10	Bosnia and Herzegovina	174.03	196.68
42	▼4	Spain	164.29	177.49
43	▼1	Russia	163.57	172.46
44	▲14	Mauritania	160.82	135.3
45	▼4	Hungary	159.05	175.59
46	▲10	North Macedonia	157.93	137.1
47	▲34	Kuwait	157.66	106.67
48	▲2	Bulgaria	155.71	151.75
49	▼13	Sudan	155.2	180.68
50	▼5	Moldova	155.18	163.13
51		Oman	152.28	
52	▲17	Azerbaijan	152.07	119.1
53	▲12	Brazil	149.28	124.61
54	▼3	Georgia	149.26	151.32
55	▼6	Serbia	148.53	154.93
56	▼14	Ukraine	145.03	172.74
57	▲5	Slovakia	143.14	130.1
58	▲16	Guyana	141.68	113.4
59	▲13	Algeria	141.53	117.36
60	▼8	Mongolia	139.82	145.31
61	▲29	Ecuador	139.6	91.5
62	▲22	New Zealand	137.25	103.79
63	▼9	Turkmenistan	137.09	140.33
64	▼31	Dominica	136.93	195.98
65	▼17	Belarus	133.73	156.1
66	▼18	United Arab Emirates	132.66	110.1
67	▼14	Uzbekistan	130.81	143.36
68	▼4	El Salvador	124.34	126.0
69	▼10	Antigua and Barbuda	123.74	135.0
70	▲23	Venezuela	117.79	87.29
71	▲20	Botswana	117.74	88.89
72	▲3	Mauritius	117.27	112.18
73	▲16	Chile	116.11	93.0
74	▼8	Cape Verde	115.64	124.55
75	▲7	Lebanon	114.52	106.0
76	▲4	Tunisia	114.47	106.91
77	▼31	Cyprus	113.31	159.11
78	▼5	Mexico	111.87	115.18
79	▲20	Maldives	111.47	79.1
80		Syria	111.43	
81	▼11	Barbados	110.48	118.61
82	▼14	Colombia	108.47	122.57
83	▼22	New Caledonia	108	131.4
84		Hong Kong	105.85	
85	▲3	Bahamas	104.76	93.18
86	▼7	Trinidad and Tobago	103.8	107
87		Netherlands Antilles	103.22	
88	▲14	Cuba	99.94	75.5
89	▲21	Mali	98.68	61.5
90	▼30	Bermuda	95.56	132.98
91	▼5	Kenya	94.86	98.64
92	▼9	French Polynesia	93.56	105
93	▼22	Honduras	91.33	118.0
94	▼16	Jamaica	91.13	108.42
95	▲9	Saint Vincent and the Grenadines	87.62	69.86
96	▼2	Saint Kitts and Nevis	87.36	86.84
97	▼2	Grenada	86.88	85.79
98	▼1	Nicaragua	85.16	84.23
99	▲6	India	84.5	68.72
100	▼13	Saudi Arabia	83.65	97.23
101	▼34	Saint Lucia	80.65	122.97
102	▼6	Belize	80.3	85.12
103		Seychelles	79.23	
104	▼12	Jordan	77.68	88.1
105	▲7	Paraguay	75.72	59.66
106		Libya	75.0	
107	▲4	Dominican Republic	73.75	60.39
108	▼8	Namibia	73.05	77.16
109	▼8	Japan	72.06	76.45
110	▼47	Brunei	70.47	129.11
111	▼5	Panama	70.29	66.94
112	▼4	Afghanistan	62.23	
113	▲2	Peru	62.15	56.11
114	▼7	Djibouti	59.81	66.49
115	▼6	Egypt	59.46	61.81
116	Steady	Niger	58.92	50.0
117		Eswatini	56.6	49.42
118	▼5	South Africa	55.75	57.92
119	▲1	Morocco	54.68	44.49
120	▼6	Tajikistan	54.54	57.59
121	▲21	Samoa	52.55	20.25
122	Steady	Nepal	52.1	40.89
123		Palestine		49.17
124	▲8	Suriname	48.97	28.19
125	▼2	Iran	46.69	66.12
126	▼5	Guatemala	46.6	40.9
127	▲6	Bolivia	46.04	28.1
128	▲9	Gambia	45.71	25.15
129	▲14	Ethiopia	44.14	18.87
130	▼3	Yemen	43.97	30.87
131		Taiwan	41.72	
132	▲6	Tanzania	40.29	23.1
133	▼7	Fiji	40.2	35.34
134		Macao	37.46	
135	▲4	Uganda	37.27	23.1
136	▼9	Sri Lanka	34.98	36.1
137	▼9	Mainland China	32.66	28.7
138	▼9	Zimbabwe	31.9	28.61
139	▼3	Myanmar	31.48	25.52
140	▼17	Gabon	30.16	37.37
141	▲5	Burkina Faso	29.79	16.67
142	▼1	Thailand	29.35	22.48
143	▼9	South Korea	29.05	26.9
144	▼20	Malaysia	25.28	36.89
145	▼1	Lesotho	25.35	18.0
146	▼16	Vanuatu	25.21	28.42
147	▼16	Madagascar	24.84	28.25
148	▼29	São Tomé and Príncipe	22.58	45.1
149		Iraq	22.18	
150	▼3	Bangladesh	21.91	16.18
151	▼11	Chad	20.63	22.79
152	▼1	Guinea	20.62	14.59
153	▼4	Guinea-Bissau	19.88	15.36
154	▼2	Haiti	18.98	14.11
155	▼20	Senegal	16.86	26.35
156	▼1	Vietnam	16.36	11.91
157	▼12	Philippines	15.66	17.83
158	▼5	Cameroon	15.27	13.16
159	▼2	Indonesia	14.82	11.48
160	▼10	Central African Republic	13.53	14.72
161	▼7	Angola	12.3	12.6
162		Eritrea	11.57	
163	▲1	Solomon Islands	11.52	7.18
164		Comoros	11.15	
165	▲11	East Timor	10.96	2.93
166	▲9	Kiribati	10.93	3.46
167	▼8	Congo	10.69	11.1
168	▼5	Zambia	9.71	7.35
169	▼8	Ghana	9.08	8.48
170	▼10	Benin	8.4	8.72
171	▲3	Malawi	7.98	3.52
172	▼5	Togo	7.96	5.15
173	▼9	Nigeria	7.91	8.1
174	▼26	Rwanda	7.23	15.48
175	▼7	Ivory Coast	6.36	5.14
176	▼11	Sierra Leone	7	5.63
177	▼5	Mozambique	4.79	4.12
178		Burundi	4.6	
179	▼10	North Korea	3.79	7.45
180	▼14	Cambodia	3.47	5.59
181	▼11	Laos	2.92	4.63
182	▼9	Liberia	3.04	3.82
177		Democratic Republic of the Congo		1.28

== See also ==
- List of countries by milk production
- List of countries by tea consumption per capita
- List of dairy products
