= Salcë shakulli =

Albanian dairy product

- Country of origin: Albania
- Region: Përmet
- Source of milk: Sheep, Goat
- Pasteurised: No
- Texture: Soft
- Aging time: two to three months

Salcë shakulli (lit. 'Hide-sack sauce') is a traditional Albanian dairy product made from strained sheep’s or goat’s yogurt matured in a salted animal-skin sack known as shakull. The method has been carried out by shepherds in the southern mountain pastures of Trebeshinë, Dhëmbel and Nemërçkë as a means of preserving yogurt for extended periods during the summer grazing season.

== History ==
The production of salcë shakulli is rooted in the centuries-old practice of transhumance, whereby shepherds moved their flocks between lowland settlements and high-altitude pastures. Since fresh dairy products spoiled quickly under these conditions, shepherds developed ways for long-term preservation. Aging strained yogurt inside an animal skin created a dense, highly concentrated dairy product that could be stored for several months without refrigeration, while forming a distinctive rich, tangy flavor.

== Preparation ==
Preparation begins with the shakull, typically made from the hide of a sheep or goat slaughtered during winter. The hide is heavily salted and cured for several months. Once preserved, the legs are tied closed, leaving only the neck as an opening. The skin is then inflated, cleaned, turned inside out and prepared for filling.

Sheep’s or goat’s yogurt is strained to remove excess whey and placed inside the prepared sack. Salt is added to the yogurt and regularly applied to the exterior of the skin. As the contents mature, moisture and whey gradually pass through the porous leather. Additional milk or yogurt may be added over several days until the shakull is full, after which it is tightly sealed and suspended to mature.

Maturation generally lasts between two and three months. During this period, whey that emerges through the skin is removed and the exterior is repeatedly salted to encourage further moisture loss. By late autumn, the yogurt has developed a thick, creamy consistency and a concentrated flavor which can be stored for consumption during the winter months.

== See also ==
- List of dairy products
