= Double skin milk =

Cantonese dessert

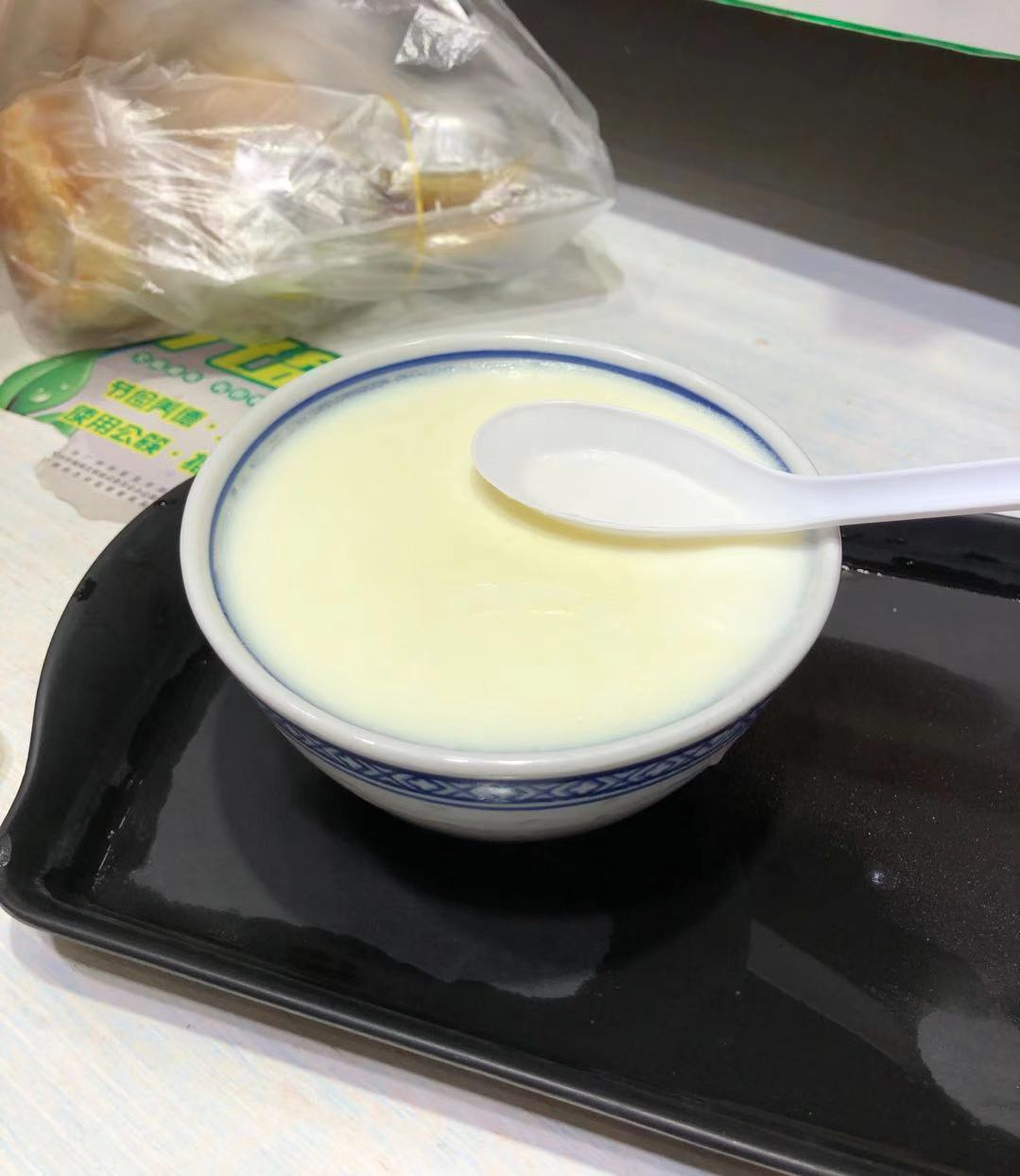
- A bowl of double skin milk from the Bai Hua Dessert Store in Guangzhou, China.
- Type: Dessert
- Course: Dessert
- Place of origin: China
- Region or state: Shunde, Guangdong
- Associated cuisine: Cantonese cuisine
- Serving temperature: Cold or warm
- Main ingredients: Milk (Buffalo milk), egg white, sugar
- Similar dishes: Pudding

Chinese name
- Traditional Chinese: 雙皮奶
- Simplified Chinese: 双皮奶
- Jyutping: soeng1 pei4 naai5
Transcriptions
Standard Mandarin
- Hanyu Pinyin: shuāngpínǎi
Yue: Cantonese
- Jyutping: soeng1 pei4 naai5

Double skin milk (Chinese: 雙皮奶; Jyutping: soeng1 pei4 naai5) is a Chinese dessert made of milk, egg whites, and sugar. It originated from Shunde, Guangdong. It is a velvety smooth milk custard somewhat resembling panna cotta, with two skins. The first skin is formed during cooling of the boiled milk and the second when cooling the cooked custard. Traditionally, buffalo milk is used; its higher fat content compared to cow's milk produces a smooth texture. The usage of milk from the swamp buffalo in China is unusual because of the low yield of milk as compared with that of cows and river buffalo used in the rest of the world. This dessert is particularly popular in Shunde, Guangzhou, Shenzhen, Macau, and Hong Kong.

Double skin milk is rich in protein, calcium, and lactose.

== History ==
Double skin milk originated in the Daliang, Shunde in Guangdong. It is said to have been created by Grandma Dong in Qing Dynasty in Shunde. At that time, there was no refrigeration and the temperature was always high in Guangdong. Cowherd Grandma Dong found difficulties in storing milk. In one experiment, she boiled the milk and found a skin formed on the milk after cooling it down. The skin was surprisingly delicious. Hence, she started to sell milk with skin in her store and the products became popular in the neighborhood. However, milk with skin tended to spill easily during transportation. To solve this problem, Grandma Dong added egg white to the milk, which allowed the milk to curdle after boiling. After several improvements, contemporary double skin milk developed, with Grandma Dong credited as the originator. Nowadays, the skills used in making double skin milk are listed as part of Shunde's intangible cultural heritage.

Double skin milk has remained popular despite a competitive market for traditional food in China. Traditional double skin milk has been combined with new food trends while its traditional essence is retained.

In 2018, double skin milk was declared a Provincial Intangible Cultural Heritage.

== Toppings ==
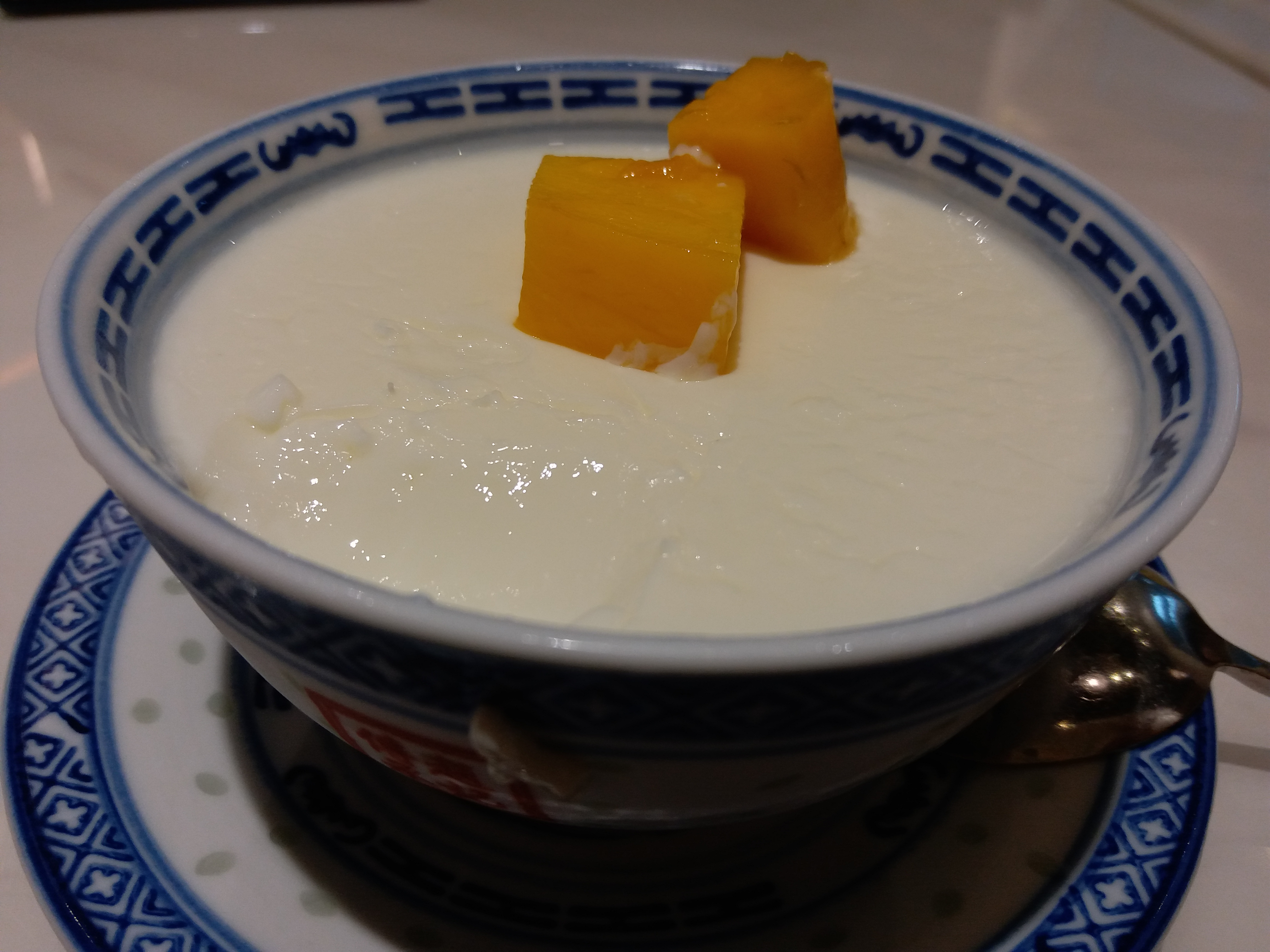
Double skin milk with mango

There are creative cooking methods of double skin milk that increase the diversity of its flavor. People like to add different toppings on the final product, for example, red bean, tapioca pudding, honey, fruit like mangos and so on.

== See also ==
- Milk skin
- List of Chinese desserts
- Dairy product
- List of sweet puddings
