= Kammerjunker (biscuit) =

Danish sweet biscuit

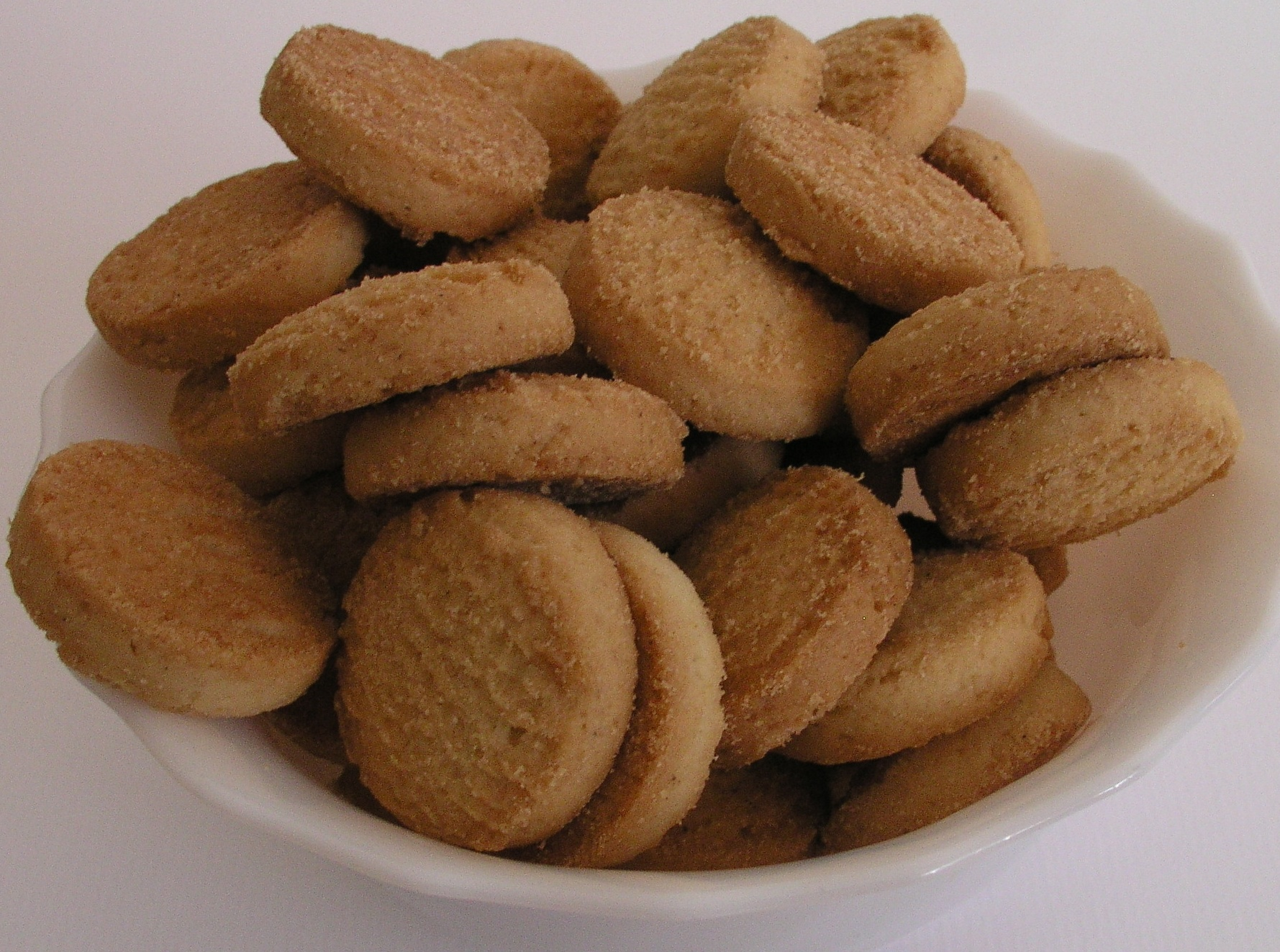
- Bowl of kammerjunkere
- Type: Biscuit
- Place of origin: Denmark
- Main ingredients: Flour, butter or other fat, eggs, sugar

A kammerjunker (lit. chamber-page) is a type of Danish sweet biscuit, which is typically eaten with koldskål, a buttermilk-based dessert. Like koldskål, kammerjunkere are eaten mostly in the summer.

Kammerjunkere are made from a dough of wheat flour, fat (for example, butter), eggs, sugar, salt, and baking soda. The dough is formed into rolls, pre-baked, sliced, and then baked again to completion. The dough is sometimes spiced with vanilla, lemon zest or cardamom, in some cases all three together. All three spices are used frequently in Scandinavian baking.
