= List of countries by milk production =

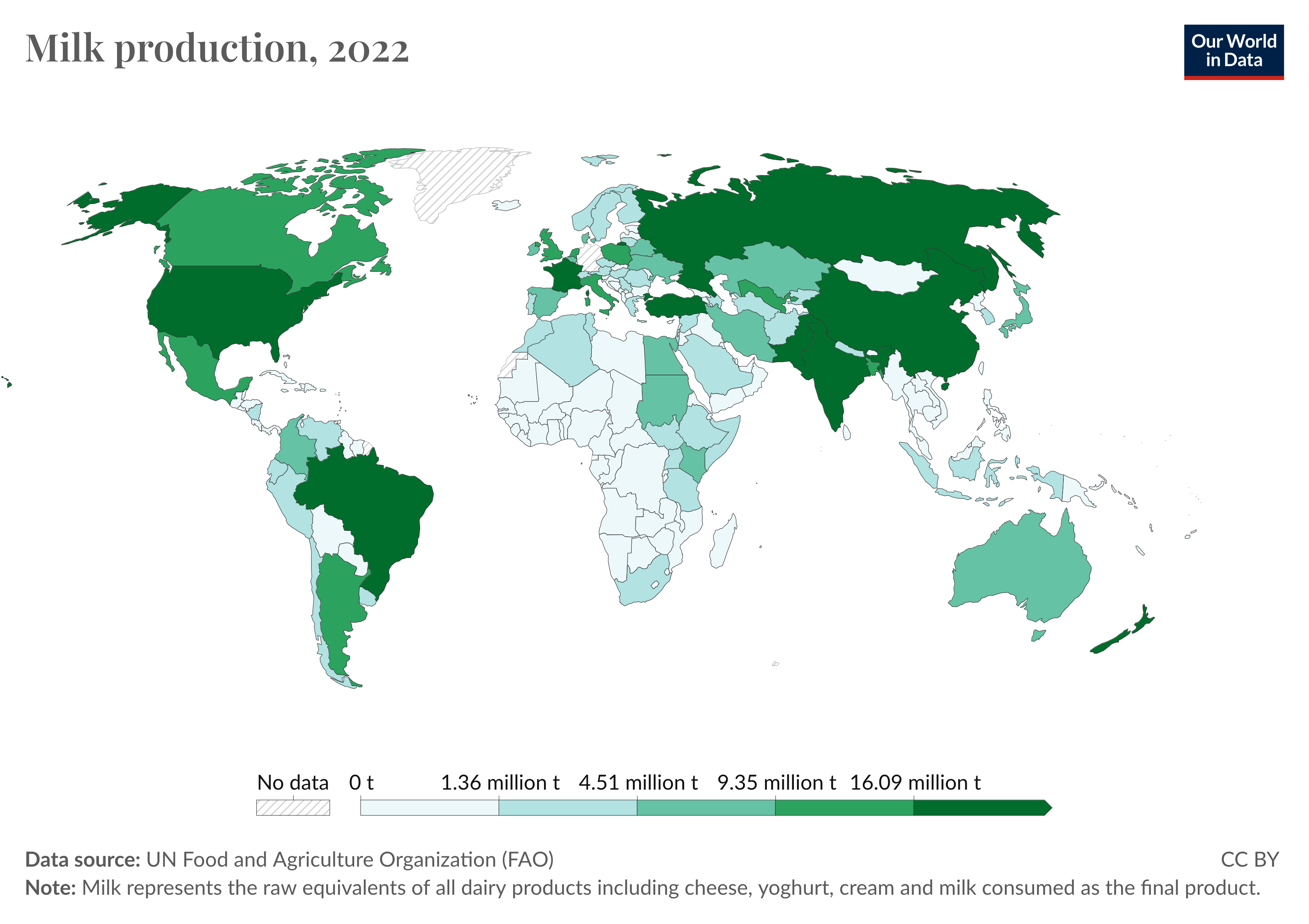
Milk production by country

The following article lists the world's largest producers of milk. Global milk production has increased rapidly over the past 50 years. According to Our World in Data, global milk production has nearly tripled since 1961, reaching around 930 million tonnes in 2022. The most popular milk is cow milk, followed by buffalo milk, goat milk, sheep milk and camel milk.

== Production by country ==
The table shows the countries by milk production.

Country	Milk production (tonnes)	Year
India	213,779,230	2022
United States	102,747,320	2022
Pakistan	62,557,950	2022
China	39,914,930	2023
Brazil	35,944,056	2022
Germany	33,188,890	2020
Russia	32,977,956	2022
France	25,028,850	2022
Turkey	21,563,492	2022
New Zealand	21,051,000	2022
United Kingdom	15,540,640	2022
Poland	15,218,080	2022
Netherlands	14,978,960	2022
Italy	13,971,690	2022
Mexico	13,728,428	2022
Bangladesh	13,074,000	2022
Argentina	11,904,142	2022
Uzbekistan	11,599,137	2022
Canada	8,483,000	2022
Australia	8,450,000	2022
Iran	8,342,913	2022
Belarus	7,887,512	2022
Ukraine	7,767,600	2022
Japan	7,617,473	2022
Colombia	7,421,000	2022
Kazakhstan	6,367,030	2022
Egypt	5,724,420	2022
Kenya	5,676,123	2022
Denmark	5,664,000	2022
Sudan	4,665,197	2022
Belgium	4,618,000	2022
Ethiopia	4,484,393	2022
Romania	4,261,900	2022
Austria	3,980,300	2022
South Africa	3,771,000	2022
Switzerland	3,740,200	2022
Tanzania	3,679,743	2022
South Sudan	3,449,313	2022
Czech Republic	3,339,810	2022
Algeria	3,321,114	2022
Saudi Arabia	2,849,957	2022
Sweden	2,764,840	2022
Nepal	2,725,634	2022
Venezuela	2,524,250	2022
Turkmenistan	2,498,450	2022
Chile	2,292,832	2022
Uruguay	2,286,703	2022
Peru	2,267,208	2022
Azerbaijan	2,264,679	2022
Finland	2,258,630	2022
Afghanistan	2,233,261	2022
Somalia	2,157,154	2022
Morocco	2,151,866	2022
Hungary	2,044,900	2022
Portugal	2,030,930	2022
Syria	2,029,839	2022
Greece	1,999,420	2022
South Korea	1,983,391	2022
Ecuador	1,872,346	2022
Kyrgyzstan	1,734,691	2022
Israel	1,691,672	2022
Uganda	1,674,018	2022
Indonesia	1,581,467	2022
Lithuania	1,521,940	2022
Norway	1,513,256	2022
Serbia	1,512,107	2022
Nicaragua	1,436,684	2022
Tunisia	1,412,476	2022
Niger	1,312,846	2022
Thailand	1,222,000	2022
Costa Rica	1,220,227	2022
Vietnam	1,184,673	2022
Tajikistan	1,077,337	2022
Mali	1,010,361	2022
Albania	999,273	2022
Mongolia	990,401	2022
Latvia	975,290	2022
Slovakia	926,980	2022
Myanmar	911,885	2022
Bulgaria	868,600	2022
Dominican Republic	860,771	2022
Estonia	848,600	2022
Honduras	691,734	2022
Armenia	654,170	2022
Bolivia	629,666	2022
Slovenia	628,110	2022
Bosnia and Herzegovina	615,687	2022
Georgia	598,563	2022
Paraguay	558,738	2022
Croatia	535,000	2022
Guatemala	528,051	2022
Nigeria	527,437	2022
Sri Lanka	522,793	2022
Zambia	514,308	2022
Madagascar	491,962	2022
Taiwan	474,534	2022
Chad	463,379	2022
Luxembourg	452,430	2022
Burkina Faso	435,408	2022
Jordan	431,055	2022
Zimbabwe	423,632	2022
Macedonia	387,967	2022
Yemen	386,574	2022
Lebanon	385,458	2022
Cuba	372,306	2022
Cyprus	366,230	2022
El Salvador	364,597	2022
Oman	363,767	2022
Mauritania	363,481	2022
Iraq	354,629	2022
Guinea	290,416	2022
Cameroon	284,390	2022
Senegal	249,724	2022
United Arab Emirates	242,006	2022
Moldova	240,400	2022
Libya	234,251	2022
Rwanda	233,987	2022
Puerto Rico	229,973	2022
Angola	223,902	2022
Botswana	222,938	2022
Malawi	219,551	2022
Palestine	211,263	2022
Jamaica	209,260	2022
Panama	179,469	2022
Montenegro	176,647	2022
Lesotho	175,926	2022
Benin	153,060	2022
Iceland	152,405	2022
Sierra Leone	149,146	2022
Eritrea	147,608	2022
Burundi	112,871	2022
Namibia	111,199	2022
Haiti	102,877	2022
North Korea	83,330	2022
Central African Republic	82,476	2022
Kuwait	74,945	2022
Guyana	55,000	2022
Ghana	50,178	2022
Gambia	48,679	2022
Bhutan	46,757	2022
Qatar	45,542	2022
Malaysia	44,560	2022
Malta	42,070	2022
Eswatini	39,719	2022
Guinea-Bissau	39,200	2022
Côte d'Ivoire	31,759	2022
Philippines	31,188	2022
Réunion	26,146	2006
Cambodia	23,902	2022
Mozambique	23,714	2022
Djibouti	14,943	2022
Comoros	13,058	2022
Fiji	12,767	2022
Togo	11,649	2022
Bahrain	11,065	2022
Gabon	10,686	2022
Cape Verde	9,972	2022
Democratic Republic of the Congo	9,213	2022
Liberia	8,601	2022
Laos	7,300	2022
Faroe Islands	7,197	2022
Dominica	7,012	2022
East Timor	6,562	2022
Belize	6,558	2022
Republic of the Congo	4,543	2022
Barbados	4,039	2022
Solomon Islands	3,053	2022
Suriname	2,840	2022
Vanuatu	2,450	2022
Mauritius	2,231	2022
Bahamas	2,058	2022
Antigua and Barbuda	1,970	2022
Samoa	1,661	2022
Trinidad and Tobago	1,394	2022
Saint Lucia	1,036	2022
French Polynesia	847	2022
Saint Vincent and the Grenadines	739	2022
Grenada	563	2022
Sao Tome and Principe	529	2022
New Caledonia	446	2022
Tonga	324	2022
French Guiana	293	2006
Papua New Guinea	203	2022
Brunei	172	2022
Seychelles	168	2022
Guadeloupe	160	2006
Hong Kong	60	2022
Niue	58	2022

== World production ==
World production in tonnes

Year	Production
1961	344,170,270
1962	346,835,300
1963	344,276,450
1964	349,473,180
1965	364,798,050
1966	373,451,460
1967	381,786,500
1968	390,060,400
1969	391,139,780
1970	391,927,680

Year	Production
1971	394,984,420
1972	405,233,570
1973	412,157,060
1974	420,401,660
1975	424,717,060
1976	433,538,980
1977	446,283,400
1978	452,706,460
1979	459,728,480
1980	465,797,060

Year	Production
1981	469,799,200
1982	480,000,960
1983	498,517,470
1984	503,380,380
1985	511,705,660
1986	521,277,570
1987	520,913,440
1988	528,357,700
1989	536,220,770
1990	542,448,830

Year	Production
1991	531,594,940
1992	524,339,650
1993	526,357,950
1994	531,231,600
1995	538,200,900
1996	545,521,340
1997	549,415,230
1998	558,327,200
1999	570,322,240
2000	579,159,100

Year	Production
2001	589,442,000
2002	603,930,900
2003	616,549,500
2004	629,925,570
2005	649,523,200
2006	666,201,540
2007	679,896,640
2008	695,300,600
2009	708,528,060
2010	725,338,700

Year	Production
2011	743,388,860
2012	761,761,000
2013	772,768,100
2014	802,548,600
2015	817,668,600
2016	827,616,260
2017	850,522,560
2018	871,573,570
2019	891,624,450
2020	921,289,400

Year	Production
2021	940,609,900
2022	930,295,040
2023	965,700,000
2024	982,000,000
2025	
2026	
2027	
2028	
2029	
2030	

== See also ==
- List of countries by milk consumption per capita
- List of largest dairy companies
