= Çökelek =

Turkish cheese

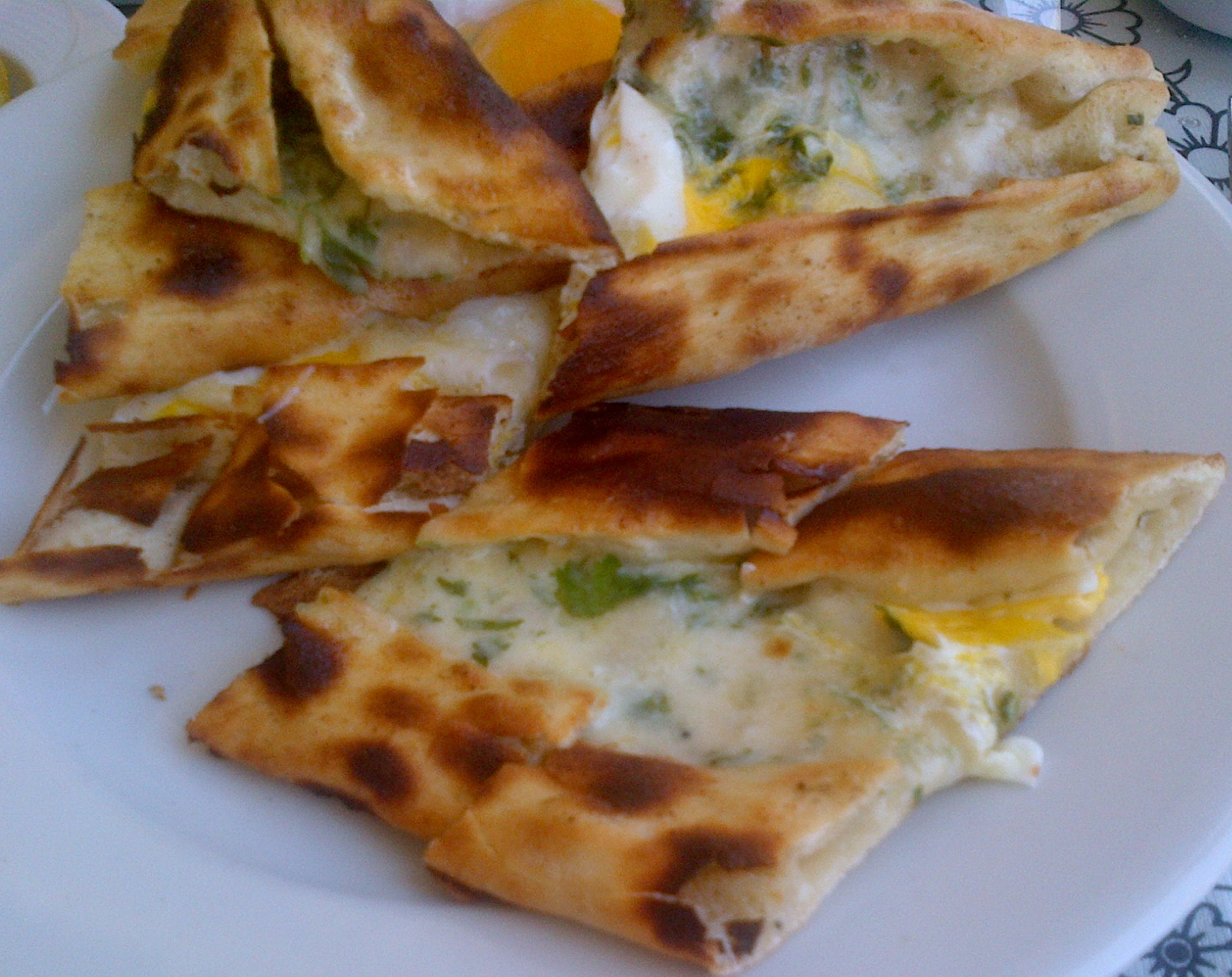
Pide with çökelek and egg filling

Çökelek (Azerbaijani: Şor) is a fermented and acid/heat coagulated fresh cheese from Turkey and Azerbaijan. It can be produced from heating fermented buttermaking by-products such as buttermilk (yayıkaltı), though skimmed milk yogurt can also be used as a starting material. It can also be obtained from yayık ayranı through heat exposure. Despite its similar appearance, it is distinct from Lor, a form of curdled whey product similar to cottage cheese. Keş, şor, ekşimik and minci are different local names associated with çökelek.

According to Sevan Nişanyan, çökelek is etymologically Turkish in origin. It has been postulated that çökelek had derived from the verb çök- (to coagulate, to sit in Turkish) and the suffix -ak/-ek. Oldest written record about the cheese could be dated to 15th century.

== See also ==
- Kashk
- Acid curd
