= Qimiq =

Dairy product

QimiQ is a dairy product consisting of 99% light cream and 1% gelatine. It is patented by HAMA Foodservice GmbH.

The product was developed by the austrians Hans Mandl and Rudolf Haindl in 1995. It was designed to replace artificial emulsifiers and stabilizers by blending with liquids such as alcohol, vinegar, or oil. QimiQ contains gelatine, which eliminates the need to soak gelatine sheets in liquid before usage. It is stable when exposed to heat or when mixed with acids or alcohol, therefore, it can be used in foods where milk or dairy products typically cannot be used.

== Background ==
QimiQ is a private Austrian company founded by Rudolf F. Haindl and Johann Mandl in 1995. QimiQ has many available variants namely; the "QimiQ Classic" (for cooking, baking, and refining), "QimiQ Whip", "Qimiq Whip Vanilla", "QimiQ Whip Chocolate", "QimiQ Whip Coffee" (for whipping), "QimiQ Sauce Base", "QimiQ Sauce Hollandaise" (for sauces and soups), "QimiQ Marinade Base" (patented liquid marinade), and 'Qiminaise' (mayonnaise without egg). According to their website, the QimiQ patent and trademark has been granted in 1999/2000, and launched in Austrian and German markets in 2000/2001 (foodservice and retail). The product has been launched in the Austrian and German foodservice and retail markets.

The two ingredients (light cream and gelatine) are blended in a production process, which protects the sensitive milk protein with a coating of milk fat and then a thin layer of gelatine. This results in a finer structure which is more compact and stable.

In 2003, QimiQ won the gold medal at the Mercury Awards and was pronounced the overall winner as the best and most innovative product. In 2004, it won the ICD Award (Switzerland) as the best and most innovative product as well.
