= So (dairy product) =

Dairy product from Japan

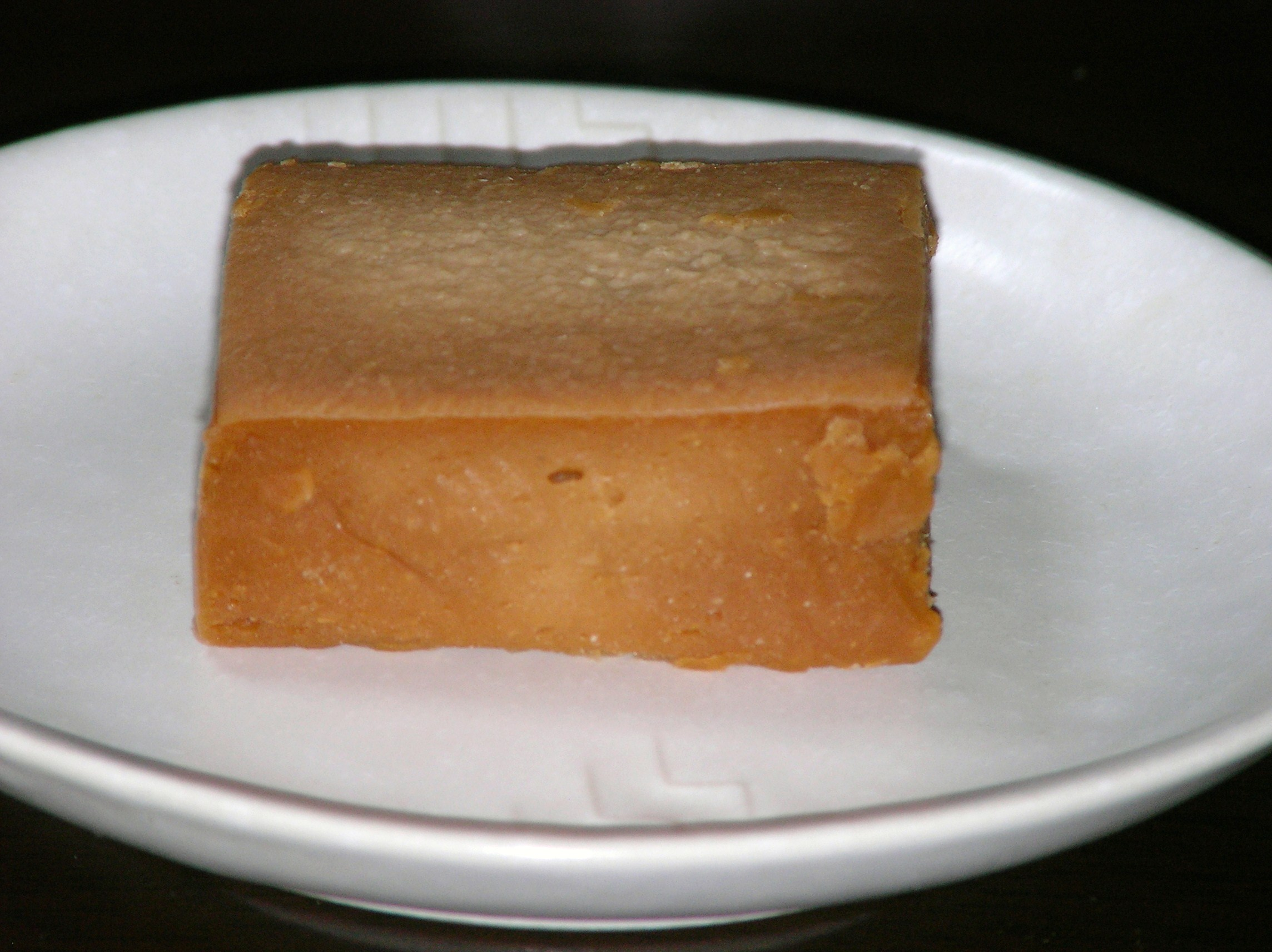
So (reproduced）

So (蘇, originally 酥) was a type of dairy product made in Japan between the seventh and 10th centuries. According to Engishiki, so was introduced from Baekje, and acted as a gift in kind to the emperors. Daigo was produced by further processing of so.

The first record of so was made during the era of Emperor Mommu (697–707 AD). Tennyakuryo, then a part of the Ministry of Imperial Household, was responsible for the production of so. It was used as a medicine and as an offering to gods.

The production sites known to date include Ajifu in Settsu (present-day Higashiyodogawa-ku in Osaka). So was made by solidifying layers of milk skin. The flavor was light, similar to that of cottage cheese.
