= Pytia =

Greek curdled milk

- Type: Curdled milk

Pytia (Greek: Πυτιά, Ancient Greek: Πυετία Pyetia also) is curdled milk obtained from an animal's stomach, containing (and used as) rennet.
