= Yayık ayranı =

Traditional Turkish beverage

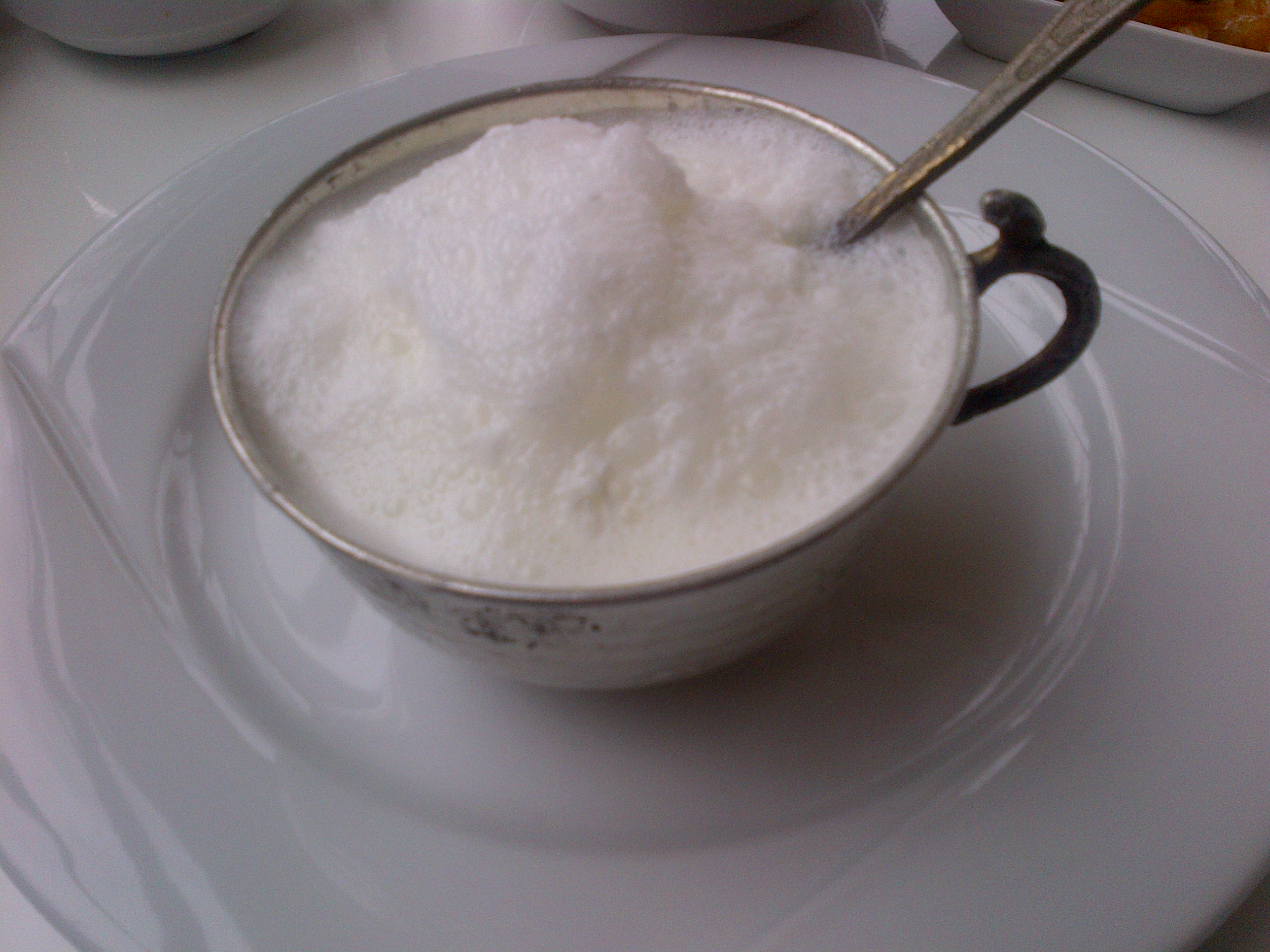
Yayık ayranı in a metal cup

Yayık ayranı, also known as Turkish buttermilk, is a traditional Turkish drink produced from fermented buttermaking by-products, water and salt. It has been traditionally prepared in barrel churns or skin bags. Despite the similar name, it is distinct from ayran. Goat, sheep, or cow's milk can be used for Turkish buttermilk production. Certain acid curd cheeses such as çökelek could also be obtained from yayık ayranı when heated.

Yayık ayranı is not available on gross markets since it is not produced on an industrial scale, though it is available in local markets.

== Production ==
Yayık ayranı is made of churned soured yogurt, water and salt. It is mostly produced in rural communities for domestic consumption during buttermaking out of yogurt. In general, yogurt for butter production is fermented longer than usual for extra acid production. The yayık ayranı thus has a distinct sour taste. Lactic acid bacteria isolated from yogurt, fermented butter and yayık ayranı encompass Lactobaccillus delbrueckii subsp. bulgaricus, Streptococcus thermophilus and Lactococcus diacetylactis.

=== Churning and salting ===
Traditional Turkish churns for butter and buttermilk production are made of various materials such as animal skin (dried and boiled goat or sheepskin), wood barrels, earthenware or metal, although in modern times electrically driven churns has become popular. Mechanical force needed for churning process can also be provided by riding animals such as horses and mules. This method of production is observed especially among nomadic pastoralist communities during seasonal yaylak migrations. There are also older reports stating that local communities in Turkey were using washing machines as churns.

Before churning, yogurt in churns is diluted by 50 per cent with cold water and partly-congealed butter accumulated on top is extracted after churning. Moreover, the amount of water used for dilution varies, resulting in yayık ayranı with different viscosities. Water dilation is followed by salting process, which comprises 0.5-1.0% salt addition.

== See also ==
- Buttermilk
- Ayran
