= Sarpuria =

Sweet originating from West Bengal, India

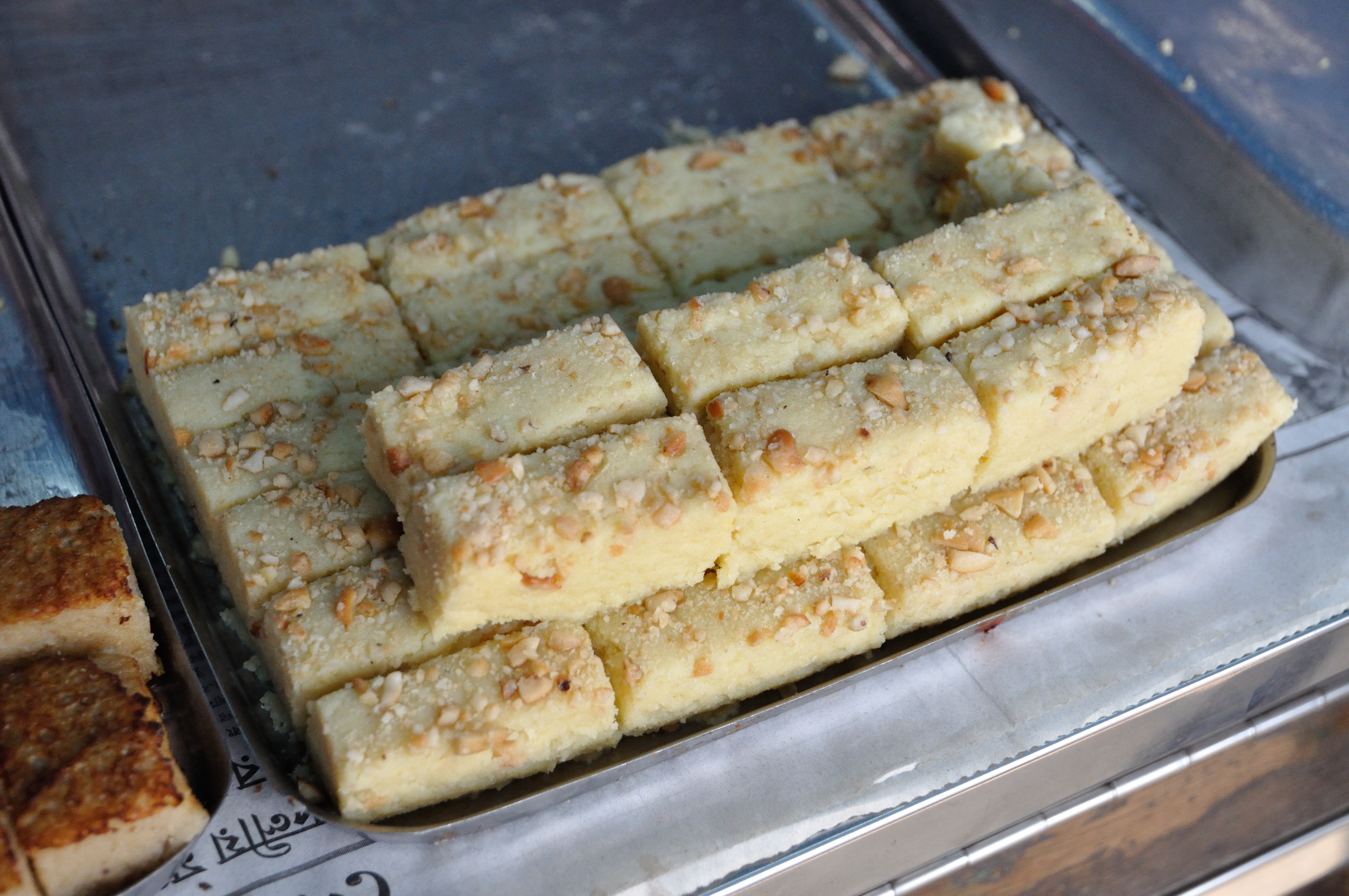
- Sarpuria of Krishnanagar
- Alternative names: সরভাজা
- Place of origin: India, Bangladesh
- Region or state: Bengal
- Main ingredients: Chana, Kheer, Sar
- Similar dishes: Sarbhaja

Sarpuria is a sweet originating from Bengal. It is a speciality of Krishnanagar, India. Sarpuria is a famous sweet in the rural areas of Bangladesh too.

== Origin ==
There are two leading stories that tell the origin of Sarapuriya. The first story associates it with the 15th-16th century religious leader Chaitanya. According to the 16th-century text Chaitanya Charitamrita written by Krishnadasa Kaviraja, sarpuria was one of the sweets served to Chaitanya.

The other story says the creator of Sarpuria was Adhar Chandra Das of Krishnanagar. By one account, Sarpuria's creator is his father, Surukumar Das. It is said that, behind closed doors, at night, he used to make Sarapuriya and Sarvaja with cottage cheese, condensed milk, and cream. The next morning, carrying them on his head, he would peddle them. Adhar Chandra learned how to cook sweets from his father. In 1902, he established a well-known sweet shop at Nadiar Para, in the present Ananta Hari Mitra Road.

== Geographical indication status ==
Sarpuria will get the GI registration as the origin of the sweet. The West Bengal Government sent the registration details for the GI tag on 25 May 2017.
