= Ábrystir =

Icelandic dessert

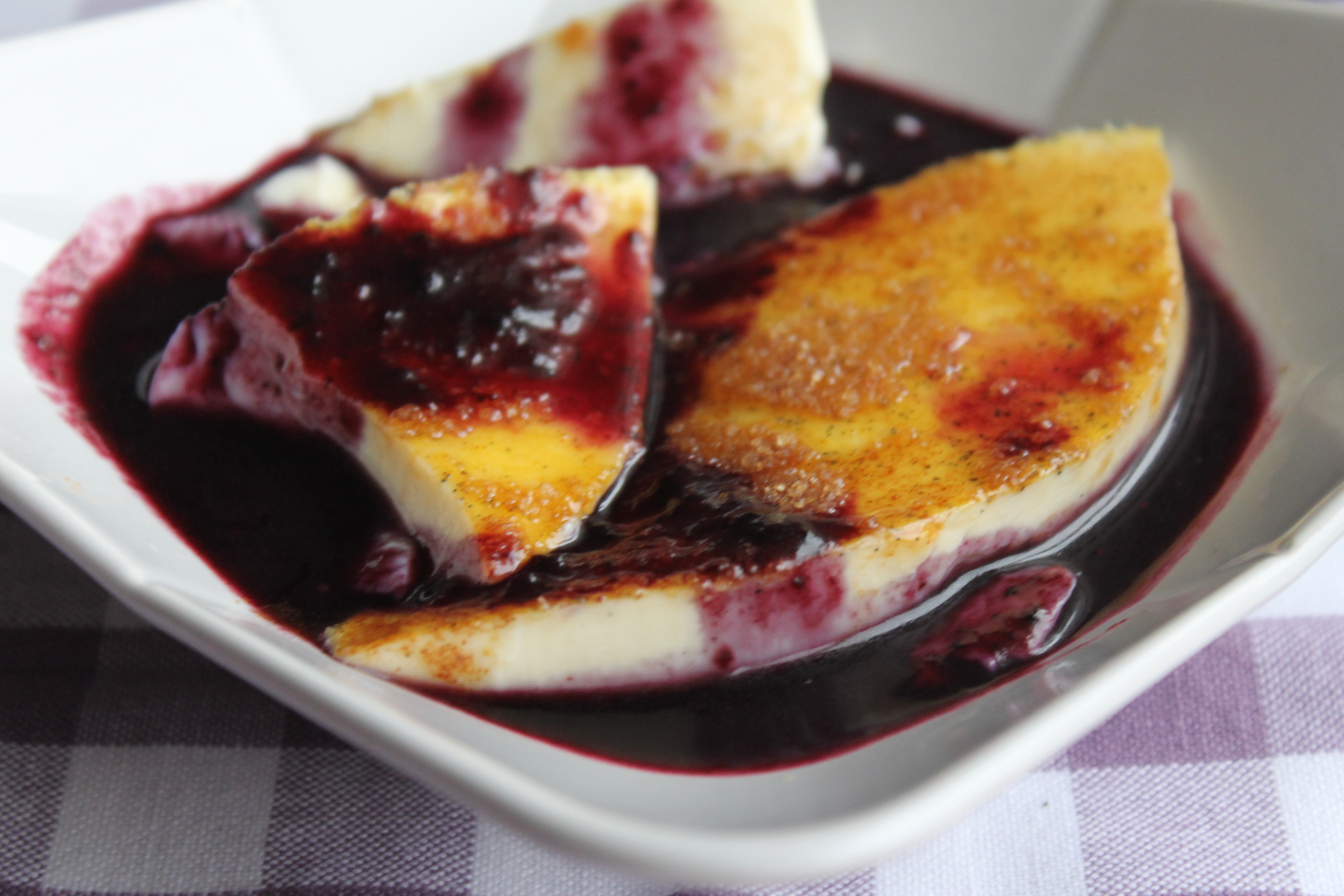
- Covered here with cinnamon sugar and blueberry sauce.
- Type: Pudding
- Place of origin: Iceland
- Main ingredients: Cow or sheep milk

Ábrystir (Icelandic pronunciation: [ˈauːˌprɪstɪr̥]) is a type of colostrum pudding consumed in Iceland. It is made from cow's or sheep's milk and has a rich and thick texture similar to that of crème caramel. Ábrystir can be eaten hot, tepid, or cold, and it is common to add sugar or cinnamon to the pudding to enhance its flavor.

== See also ==
- Beestings
