= Uunijuusto =

Finnish dessert made of colostrum

- Type: Dessert
- Place of origin: Finland
- Main ingredients: Colostrum, salt; or milk and eggs

Uunijuusto (Finnish pronunciation: [ˈuːniˌjuːsto]) is a Finnish dish made from cow's colostrum, the first milk of a calved cow, salted and baked. Sometimes uunijuusto is also made from ordinary milk and eggs. In Sweden, the dish is named kalvdans (calve's dance).

The word uunijuusto literally means "oven cheese", but uunijuusto is not properly a cheese.

Uunijuusto is sometimes eaten for dessert with berries (often cloudberries) or jam or mehukeitto, a soup made from fresh berries such as lingonberries or redcurrants.

== See also ==
- Kalvdans
- List of dairy products
- List of desserts
