= Buttermilk koldskål =

Danish dairy beverage/breakfast

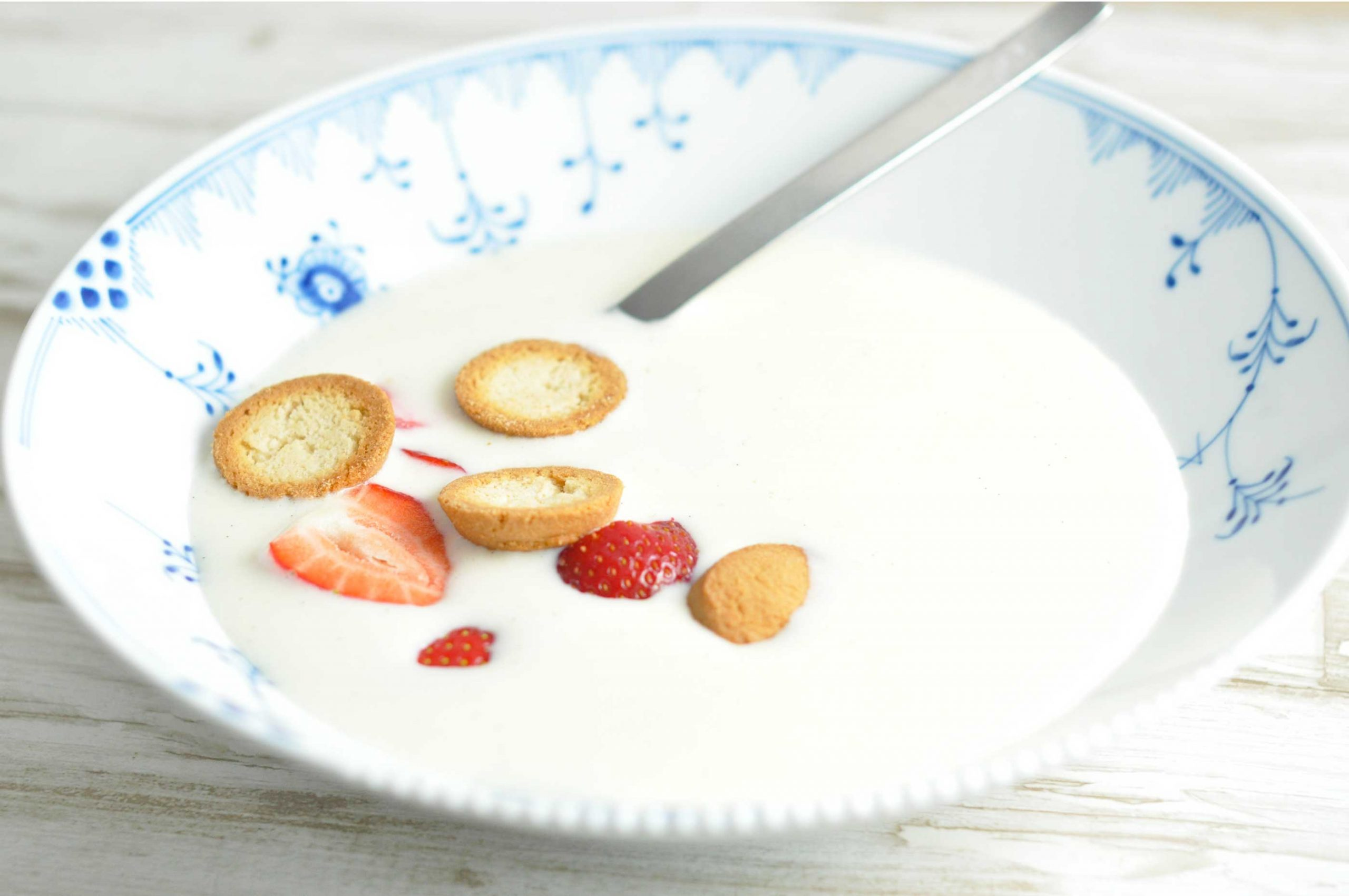
- Koldskål with kammerjunkere and strawberries served in a bowl
- Type: Beverage or soup
- Place of origin: Denmark
- Main ingredients: Buttermilk, eggs, sugar, yoghurt or other similar dairy products, vanilla, lemon

Buttermilk koldskål (Danish: kærnemælkskoldskål, often simply koldskål – literally cold bowl) is a sweet cold dairy beverage or dessert eaten in Denmark.

Koldskål is made with buttermilk and other varying ingredients: eggs, sugar, yoghurt and/or other similar dairy products, vanilla, and sometimes lemon. The dish arose when buttermilk became commonly available in Denmark in the early 1900s and was eaten chilled most days during the summer as a dessert or snack. Since 1979, there have been ready-made varieties on the Danish market, originally from Esbjerg Dairy, but now from a range of dairies, including Arla.

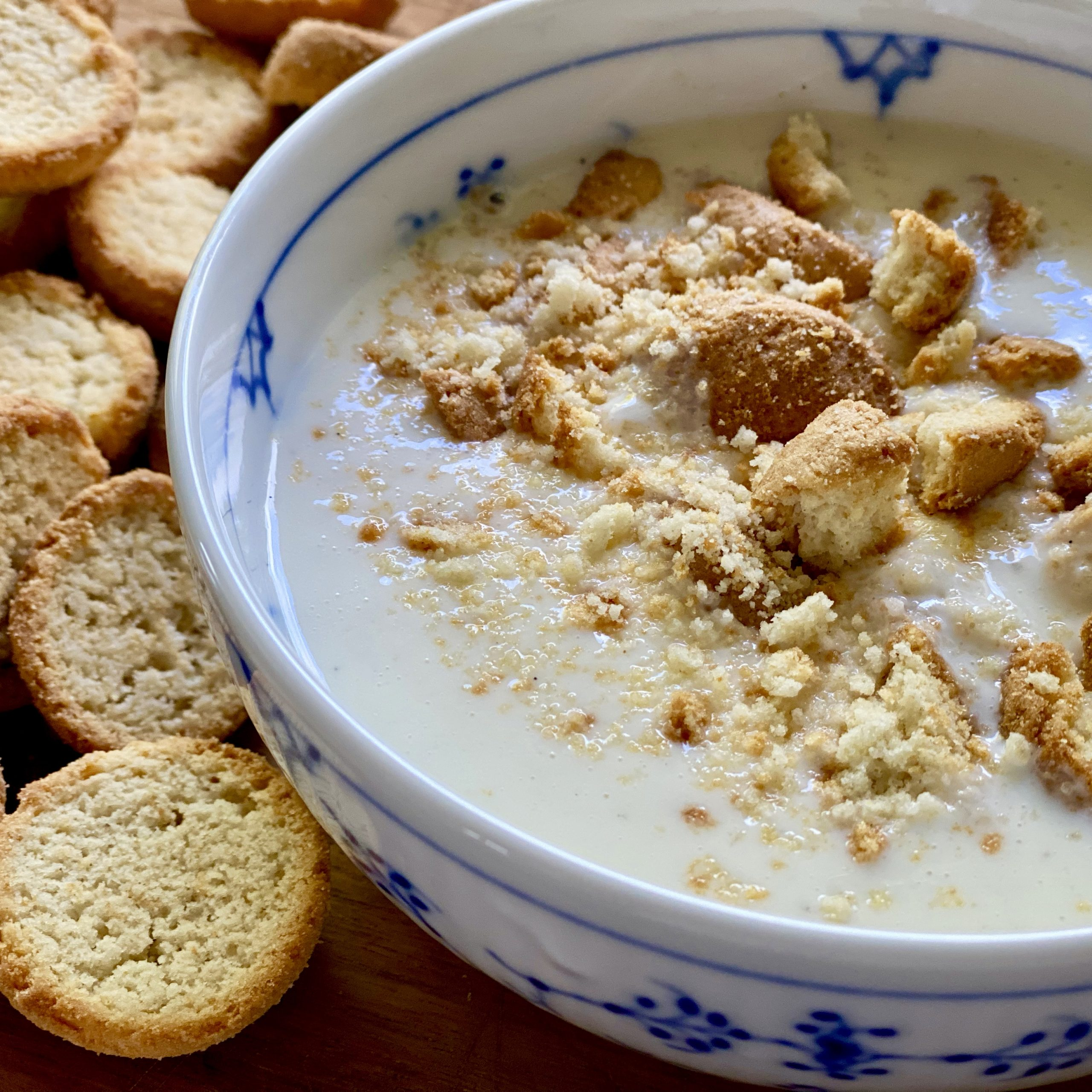
Koldskål with kammerjunkere (biscuits)

The earliest mentions of koldskål are from the 18th century, where the term was used to describe a sweet beer-based gruel, however this dish is not commonly eaten any more. It was not until the 19th century that recipes for buttermilk-based koldskål appeared, and it took until the 20th century for the dish to become a mainstay in Danish homes.

Traditionally, buttermilk koldskål is served with dry, crispy biscuits such as kammerjunkere or tvebakker. Sometimes sliced strawberries or bananas are added.

The consumption of koldskål is highly dependent on the weather, and a couple of weeks of warm weather can double the demand for ready-made koldskål. In 2013, Arla sold 3.8 million litres of koldskål in the month of July alone (about 2/3 litres per Dane).

== Similar dishes ==
Koldskål is also a popular dish in Schleswig-Holstein, Germany's northernmost state. While the 'Kaltschale' itself is the same, it is accompanied solely by Zwieback (rusk) instead of kammerjunkere. This dish features in many regional cookbooks such as "Eine Prise Ostseeluft" by Annekatrin Detlef from the island of Fehmarn.

== See also ==
- Danish cuisine
