= Kharvas =

Indian milk pudding

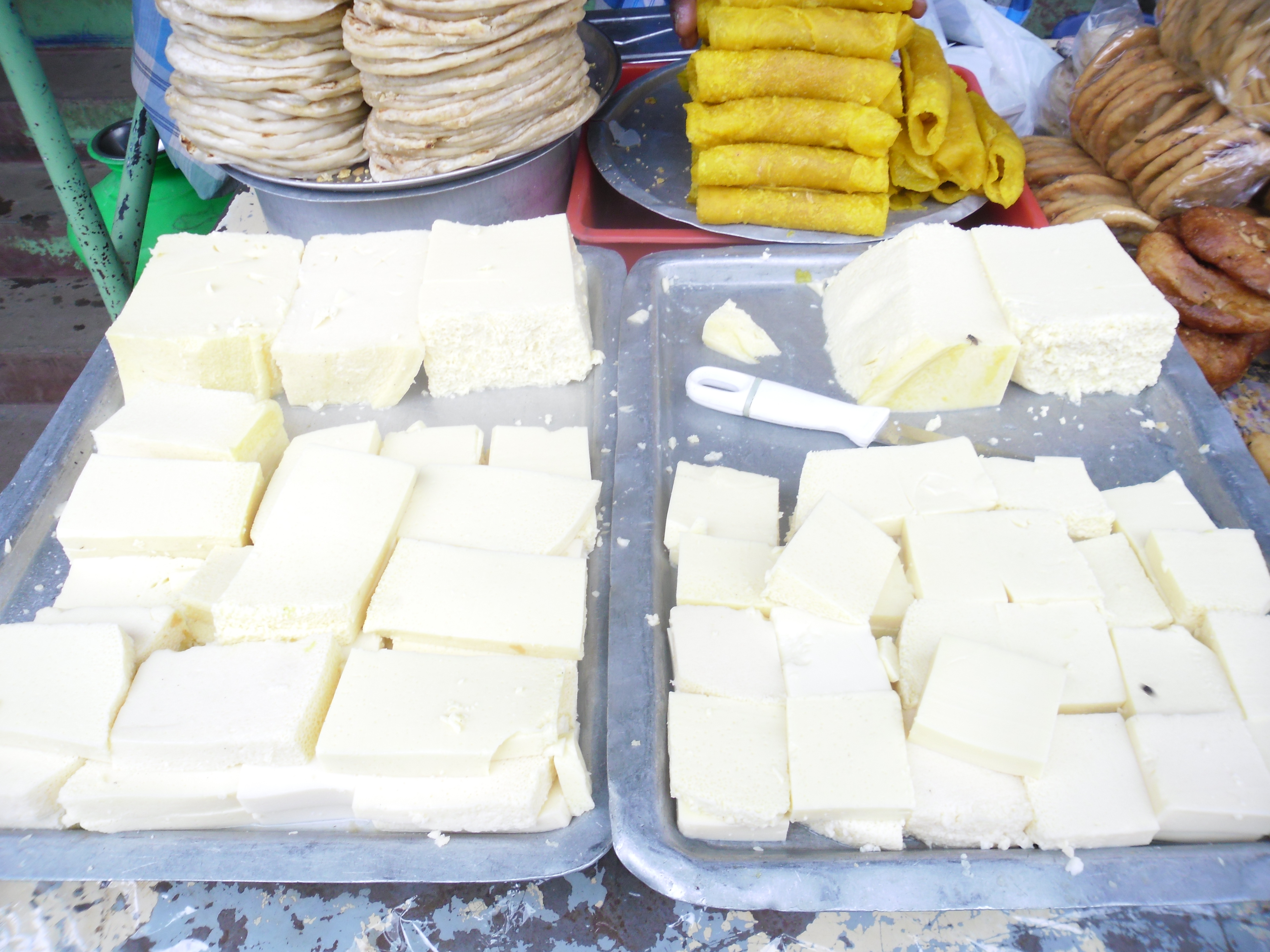
Kharvas/ Junnu/ Ginnu

Kharvas, also known as Junnu, or Ginnu, is an Indian milk pudding made from cow or buffalo colostrum, the first form of milk produced within one or two days of giving birth. It is prepared by steaming a mix of colostrum, milk, and jaggery or sugar until it coagulates into a jiggling solid. Cardamom, saffron, nutmeg or sesame is added for flavoring. The dish is rich in protein.
