= Sarpir-maṇḍa =

Type of dairy product

sarpir-maṇḍa

Chinese name
- Chinese: 醍醐
Transcriptions
Standard Mandarin
- Hanyu Pinyin: tíhú

Korean name
- Hangul: 제호
Transcriptions
- Revised Romanization: jeho

Japanese name
- Hiragana: だいご
Transcriptions
- Romanization: daigo

Sarpir-maṇḍa (Sanskrit: सर्पिर्मण्ड) was a type of dairy product, one of five stages of milk described in Hindu and Buddhist texts.

== In Buddhist texts ==
Buddhist texts including the Nirvana Sutra describe five stages of milk as an analogy to stages of purification of the spirit:

	Sanskrit	Chinese translation	English translation
1	क्षीर kṣīrá	乳 rǔ	milk
2	दधि dádhi	酪 lào	curd or sour milk
3	नवनीत návanīta	生酥 shēng sū	raw butter
4	सर्पिस् sarpís	熟酥 shú sū	ghee, cooked cheese
5	सर्पिर्मण्ड sarpir-maṇḍa	醍醐 tí hú	purified kumis, ghee, oil condensed on cheese

乳變為酪，酪為生酥，生酥為熟酥，熟酥為醍醐，醍醐為第一。

— 『長阿含經』

Milk yields curd; curd yields butter; butter yields sarpis; sarpis yields sarpir-maṇḍa; sarpir-maṇḍa is the best.

Sarpir-maṇḍa has been theorised to be the early form of ghee.

== In East Asia ==
In Chinese Buddhist texts, sarpir-maṇḍa was translated to tíhú (醍醐). The entry for tíhú in Compendium of Materia Medica (1578) quotes various references, the earliest of which was written in the 5th century Liu Song dynasty.

The word 醍醐 is pronounced daigo in Japan. The word has been used in Daigo Temple, Emperor Daigo and Emperor Go-Daigo (both of whom named after the temple), and the word daigo-mi (醍醐味), which means a superb flavor.

According to The Japanese Dairy Association, Emperor Daigo encouraged the production of so (酥, the aforementioned návanīta and sarpís), daigo, and other cheese-like products during his reign in the 10th century.

== See also ==
- Chrism
- Ghee
- Whey
