= Gombe (dish) =

Traditional Norwegian dish

Gombe is a traditional dish from Sogn og Fjordane in Norway. It is made from curdled unpasteurized milk which is boiled down with sugar for several hours. It is generally served with lefse.
