= Scalding =

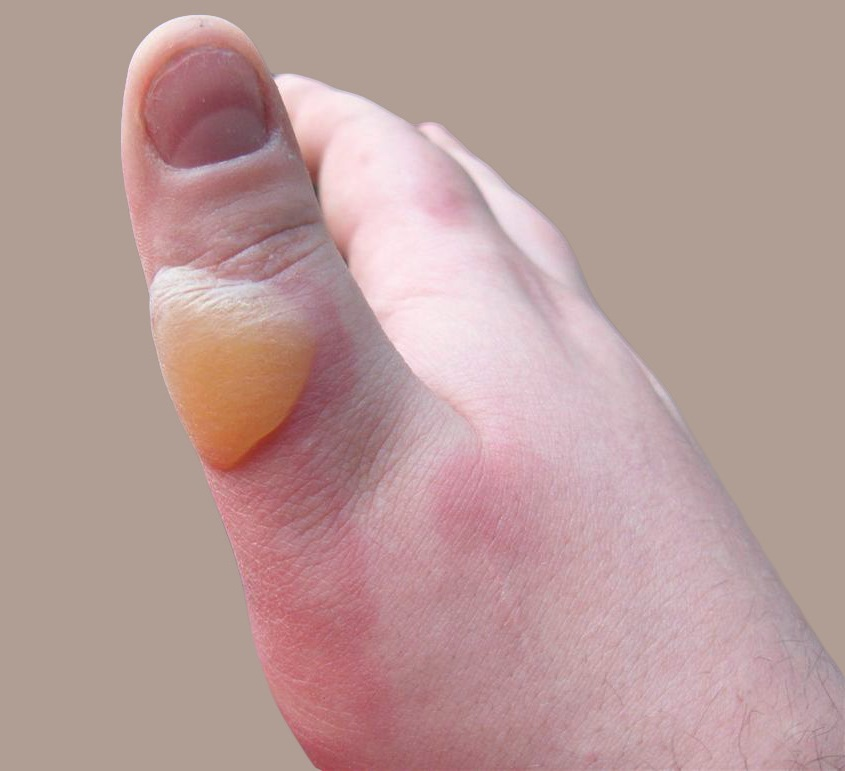
- Scalded thumb, two days after a radiator explosion.
- Specialty: Dermatology
- Causes: Hot liquids, steam

Scalding is a form of thermal burn resulting from heated fluids such as boiling water or steam. Most scalds are considered first- or second-degree burns, but third-degree burns can result, especially with prolonged contact. The term is from the Latin word calidus, meaning hot.

== Causes ==
Most scalds result from exposure to high-temperature water, such as tap water in baths and showers, water heaters, or cooking water, or from spilled hot drinks, such as coffee.

Scalds can be more severe when steam impinges on the naked skin, because steam can reach higher temperatures than water, and it transfers latent heat by condensation. However, when clothes are soaked with hot water, the heat transfer is often of a longer duration, since the body part cannot be removed from the heat source as quickly.

=== Temperatures ===
The temperature of tap water should not exceed 38–45 °C (100–113 °F) to prevent discomfort and scalding. However, it is necessary to keep warm water at a temperature of 55–60 °C (131–140 °F) to inhibit the growth of legionella bacteria.

The American Burn Association states that a scalding injury occurs when skin is placed in contact with water measuring 155 degrees Fahrenheit, or 68 degrees Celsius, for one second.

Degrees (F) x Time (s)
155 (68.33 °C)	148 (64.44 °C)	140 (60 °C)	133 (56.11 °C)	125 (51.66 °C)
1	2	5	15	90

Burn injuries may occur in two seconds, for water measuring 148 degrees Fahrenheit, or 64 degrees Celsius. At 140 degrees Fahrenheit, or 60 degrees Celsius, scalding injuries may occur within five seconds. Scalding injuries can occur within 15 seconds of exposure to water that is 133 degrees Fahrenheit, or 56 degrees Celsius. At 125 degrees Fahrenheit, or 52 degrees Celsius, scalding injuries may occur in 90 seconds.

Scalds are more common in children, especially from the accidental spilling of hot liquids.

== Food production ==
=== Beef, poultry and pork ===
The carcasses of beef, poultry and pork are commonly scalded after slaughter, to facilitate the removal of feathers and hair. Methods include immersion in tanks of hot water or spraying with steam. The scalding may be hard or soft, in which the temperature or duration is varied. A hard scald of 58 °C (136.4 °F) for 2.5 minutes will remove the epidermis of poultry; this is commonly used for carcasses that will be frozen, so that their appearance is white and attractive.

=== Scalding milk ===
Scalded milk is milk that has been heated to 82 °C (180 °F). At this temperature, bacteria are killed, enzymes in the milk are destroyed, and many of the proteins are denatured.

In cooking, milk is typically scalded to increase its temperature, or to change the consistency or other cooking interactions due to the denaturing of proteins.

Recipes that call for scalded milk include café au lait, baked milk, and ryazhenka. Scalded milk is used in yogurt to make the proteins unfold, and to make sure that all organisms that could out-compete the yogurt culture's bacteria are killed.

Milk is both scalded and also cooled in many recipes, such as for bread and other yeast doughs, as pasteurization does not kill all bacteria, and the wild yeasts that may also be present can alter the texture and flavor. In addition, scalding milk improves the rise due to inhibition of bread rise by certain undenatured milk proteins.
