= Cheese tea =

Tea-based drink

- Alternative names: Naigai cha
- Course: Drink
- Place of origin: Taiwan
- Serving temperature: Cold
- Main ingredients: Brewed tea, sugar, salt, cream cheese, cream, condensed milk

Cheese tea, also known as naigai cha, is a beverage consisting of fruity, layered iced teas topped with a pillow of salted, whipped cream cheese. Originating in Taiwan and popularized by Hey Tea in China, the drink has since expanded to other regions, including Asia, the United States, Australia, and the United Kingdom.

== Description ==
Cheese tea consists of cold green or black tea topped with a layer of cream cheese blended with cream or condensed milk, creating a cap that can be either sweet or slightly salty. The drink can be sprinkled with salt.

Food writer Tammie Teclemariam, describing a cheese tea she sampled, observed, "There was a Creamsicle-like appeal to the combination of dairy and medium-sweet fruit, but I didn’t quite know what to make of a drink that seemed like equal parts bubble tea, Slurpee, and Frappuccino."

Writing for The Guardian, Tim Jonze described the beverage's "cheese" aspect as slightly misleading, opining that it is rather "a velvety, mascarpone-like foam that has been whisked with sugar and salt before being allowed to float atop your tea," and noting that "the whole thing looks not dissimilar to a pint of beer."

== History ==
Cheese tea emerged in Taiwan’s night markets around 2010, where vendors created a foamy, tangy topping by blending powdered cheese and salt with whipping cream and milk over cold tea. By 2012, the trend had spread to China’s Guangdong province, where the founders of Chinese tea drink chain Hey Tea refined the concept by replacing powdered ingredients with real cream cheese and fresh milk, developing a more premium version of the savory and salty topping. Hey Tea is widely recognized for introducing the beverage in China before expanding to other parts of Asia (including Hong Kong, Singapore, and Malaysia), Australia, and the United Kingdom. When the chain's Shanghai branch opened in 2017, reports indicated that customers paid others to wait in line for up to three hours on their behalf. In a December 2018 article, The New York Times noted that the drink was "already a hit in San Francisco".

In the United States, cheese tea has gained prominence in cities such as New York, where Hey Tea opened its first location in December 2023. As of January 2025, the chain operates 15 locations in the city.
