= Eisbock milk =

Condensed milk beverage

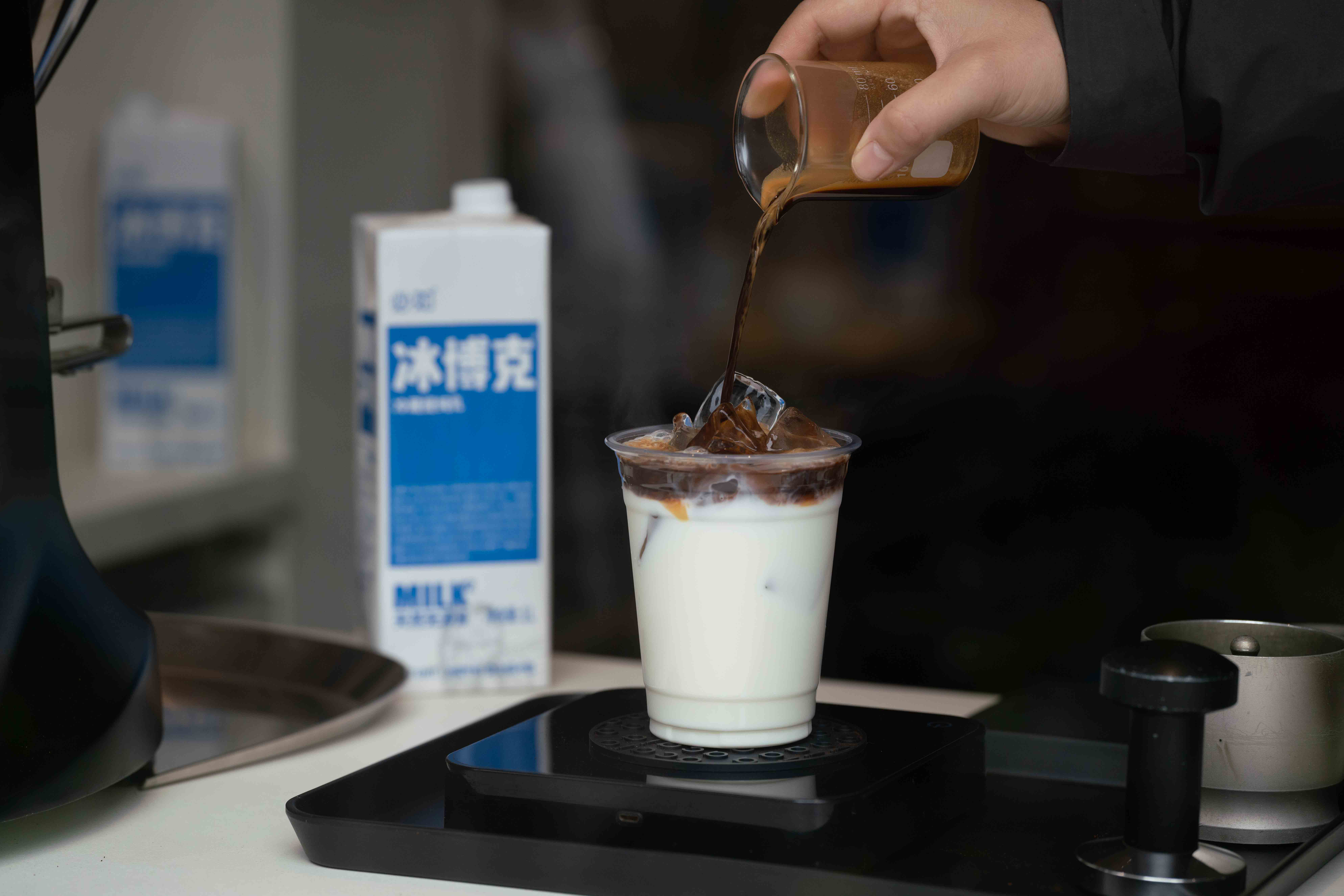
- Alternative names: Freeze distilled milk, bingboke (in Chinese)
- Place of origin: China
- Invented: 2017

Eisbock milk is a condensed milk drink. It is produced using low temperature filtration technology that physically purifies milk by removing part of its water content, the idea which is inspired by a type of strong beer from Germany.

== History ==
The process for hand-making fresh condensed milk was first attempted by Canadian barista Ben Put during the World Barista Championship in 2017. During the Chinese selection stage of the following year's competition, barista Pang Hui attempted the same technique, eventually passing on the technique to fellow barista Pan Zhimin, who used it to compete in the world championship.

After the competition, hand-making condensed milk was used to prepare milk coffee at coffee shops around China. After discovering it in coffee and tea shops in 2018, a Chinese company named BeFood (Shanghai Biru Foods Co., Ltd.) developed ways to mass-produce this type of fresh condensed milk and started to call it Bingboke (冰博克, "Ice Bock") in Chinese. BeFood officially launched its Eisbock product line in 2019. In 2020, beverage companies Hey Tea and Lele Tea developed milk tea products using Bingboke.

== Product details ==
Eisbock milk is purified twice so the milk contains less water content and a higher concentration of milk protein and calcium. Since the size of particles in milk is different, the combination of filters can separate the particles including water, protein and so on.

Eisbock's milk protein content can be as high as 6.2/100 ml with a calcium content as high as 210 mg/100 ml.

The taste can be described as sweet and mellow. It is thicker, sweeter, and creamier than regular fresh milk.

Eisbock milk is a common ingredient in “Dirty Coffee,” a coffee drink that consists of espresso layered on Eisbock milk. Dirty Coffee is achieved by carefully pouring hot and robust espresso onto chilled Eisbock milk. As the hot espresso intermingles with the pristine Eisbock milk, it gradually permeates through, resulting in an aesthetically captivating and slightly disheveled presentation, which accounts for its name. Served in a transparent glass, this visually appealing concoction allows the consumer to appreciate the artistic blend before savoring the creamy and indulgent flavors of the coffee.

== See also ==
- Baked milk
- Condensed milk
- Powdered milk
- Scalded milk
