= Evaporated milk =

Unsweetened milk product derived from cow's milk

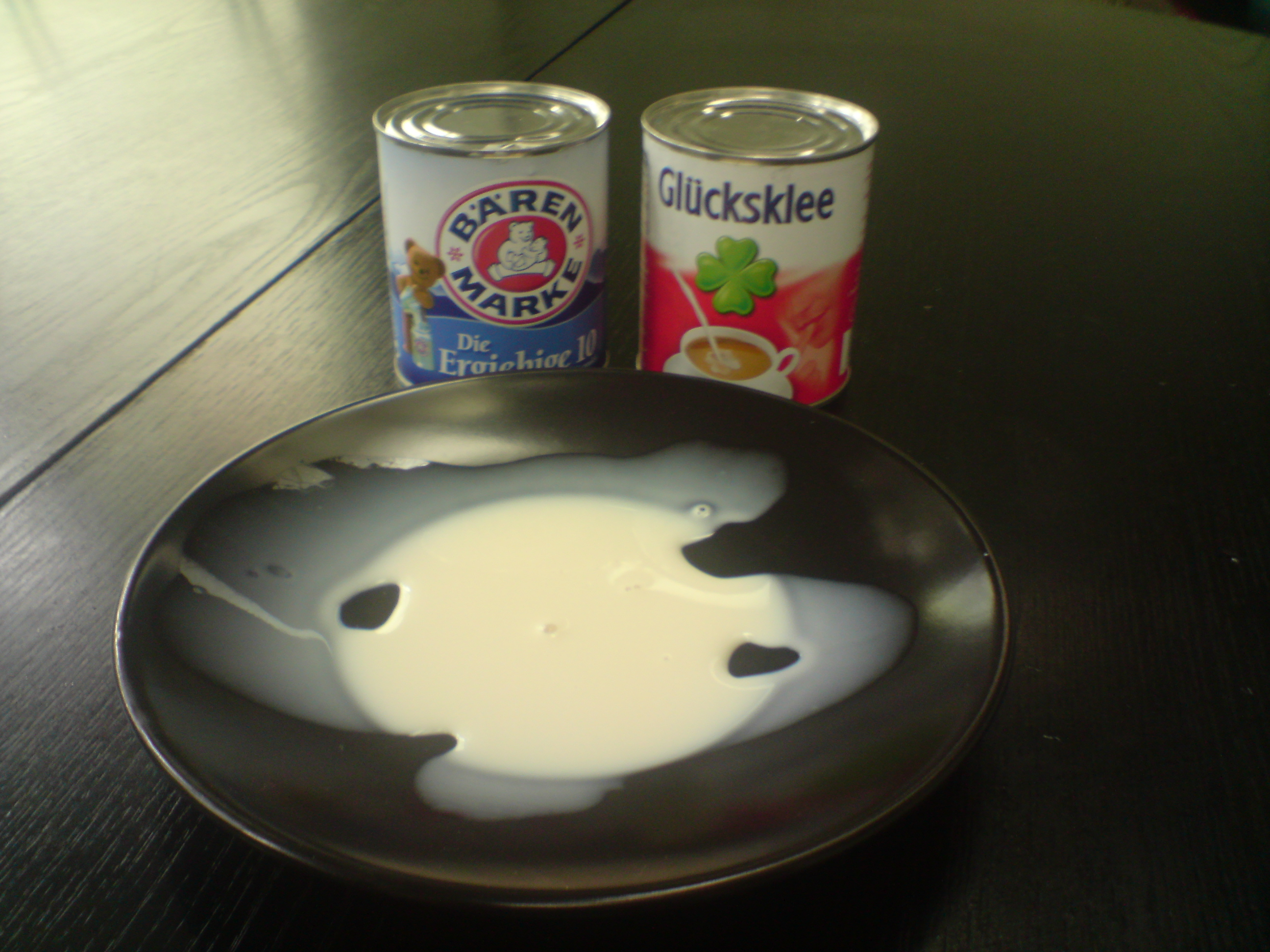

Evaporated milk, known in some countries as "unsweetened condensed milk", is a shelf-stable canned cow’s milk product, consisting of fresh milk from which approximately 60% of the water has been removed. French inventor Nicolas Appert, the "father of food science", perfected the process in the 1820s. It differs from sweetened condensed milk, which contains added sugar and requires less processing to preserve, as the added sugar inhibits bacterial growth. The production process involves the evaporation of 60% of the water from the milk, followed by homogenization, canning and heat sterilization.

Evaporated milk consumes half the space of its nutritional equivalent in fresh milk. When the liquid product is mixed with a proportionate amount of water (150%), evaporated milk becomes the rough equivalent of fresh milk. This allows the product to have a shelf life of months or even years, depending upon the fat and sugar content, which made evaporated milk very popular before the age of refrigeration as a safe and reliable substitute for perishable fresh milk, as it could be shipped easily to locations lacking the means of safe milk production or storage.

== As infant formula ==
In the 1920s and 1930s, evaporated milk became widely commercially available at low prices. The Christian Diehl Brewery, for instance, entered the business in 1922, producing Jerzee brand evaporated milk as a response to the Volstead Act, which prohibited alcoholic beverages. Several clinical studies from that time period suggest that babies fed evaporated milk formula thrived as well as did breastfed babies. However, modern guidelines issued by the World Health Organization consider breastfeeding, in most cases, to be healthier for the infant because of the colostrum in early milk production, as well as the specific nutritional content of human breast milk.

== Production ==
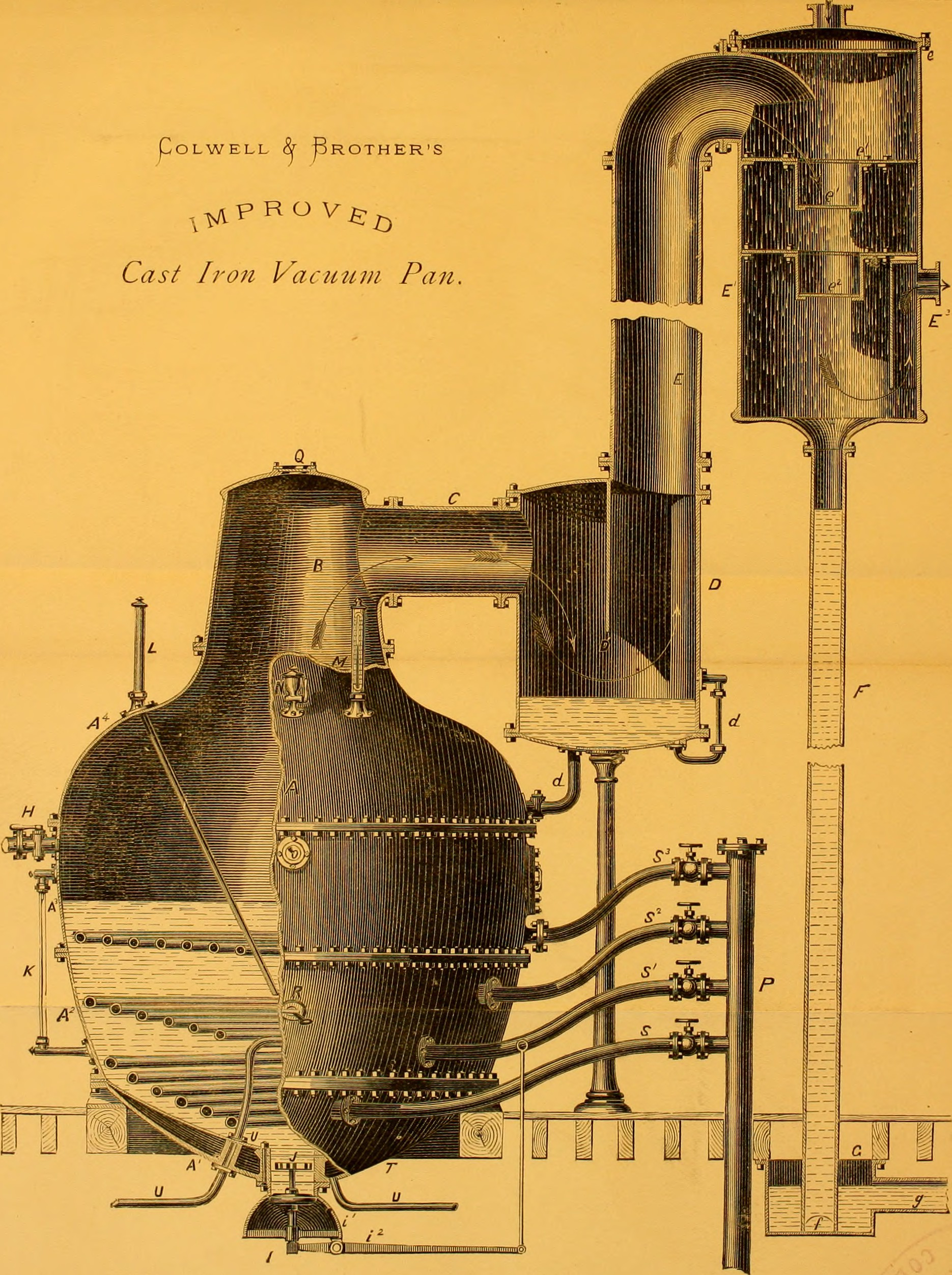
Colwell & Brothers cast iron vacuum pan for evaporating milk, 1860s

Evaporated milk is made from fresh, homogenised milk from which 60% of the water has been removed. After the water has been removed, the product is chilled, stabilised, sterilised and packaged. It is commercially sterilised at 240–245 °F (116–118 °C) for 15 minutes. A slightly caramelised flavor results from the high heat process (Maillard reaction), and it is slightly darker in colour than fresh milk. The evaporation process concentrates the nutrients and the food energy (kcal); unreconstituted evaporated milk contains more nutrients and calories than does fresh milk per unit volume.

== Additives ==
Evaporated milk generally contains disodium phosphate (to prevent coagulation) and carrageenan (to prevent solids from settling), as well as added vitamins C and D.

== Reconstitution and substitution ==
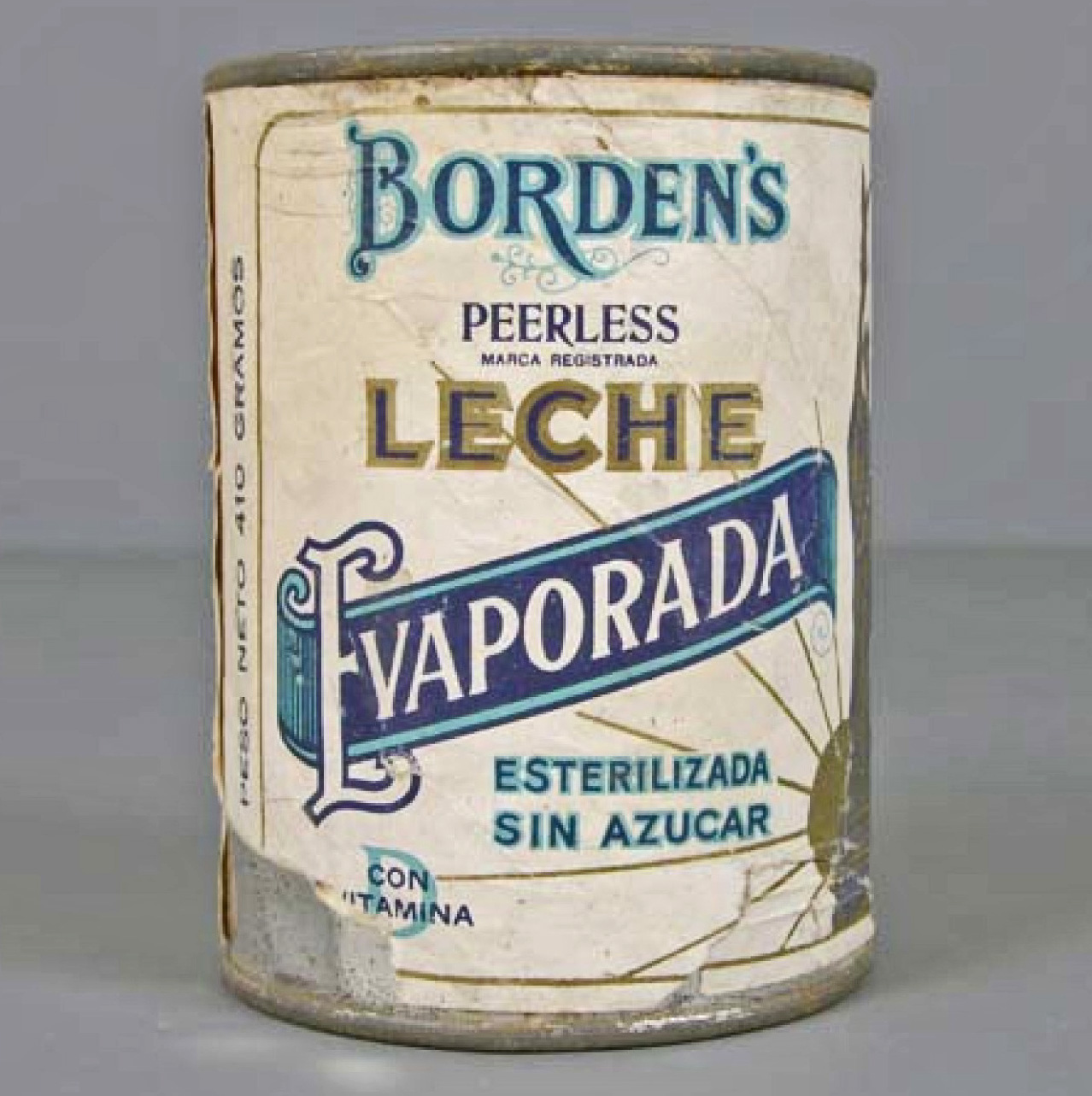
Can of Borden's evaporated milk from the second half of the 20th century. From the Museo del Objeto del Objeto collection in Mexico City.

Evaporated milk is sometimes used in its concentrated form in tea or coffee, or as a topping for desserts. Reconstituted evaporated milk, roughly equivalent to normal milk, is mixed one part by volume of evaporated milk with 1 1/4 parts of water.

=== In the United States ===
According to the United States Code of Federal Regulations, Title 21, Chapter 1, Part 131, Sub part B, Section 130 "Evaporated milk", (April 2006):

(a) Description. Evaporated milk is the liquid food obtained by partial removal of water only from milk. It contains not less than 6.5 percent by weight of milk fat, not less than 16.5 percent by weight of milk solids not fat, and not less than 23 percent by weight of total milk solids. Evaporated milk contains added vitamin D as prescribed by paragraph (b) of this section. It is homogenized. It is sealed in a container and so processed by heat, either before or after sealing, as to prevent spoilage. ...

Sections (b)–(f) of the code regulate vitamin addition, optional ingredients, methods of analysis, nomenclature and label declaration.

=== Canada ===
Evaporated milk in Canada is defined to be milk from which water has been evaporated and contains at least 25% milk solids and 7.5% milk fat. It may contain added vitamin C if a daily intake of the product contains between 60 and 75 milligrams, and may also contain vitamin D in an amount no less than 300 international units and no more than 400 international units. Disodium phosphate or sodium citrate (or both) may be added, as well as an emulsifying agent.

=== Shelf life ===
The shelf life of canned evaporated milk varies according to both its added content and its proportion of fat. For the regular unsweetened product, a shelf life of 15 months may be expected before any noticeable destabilization occurs.

== Notable producers ==
Evaporated milk is sold by several manufacturers:

- Carnation Evaporated Milk (now owned by Nestlé and licensed to Smuckers in Canada)
- Dairy Isle (Canada by ADL)
- PET Evaporated Milk (now owned by Smuckers)
- Magnolia evaporated milk - (now produced by Eagle Family Foods )
- Viking Melk (Norway) - invented by Olav Johan Sopp in 1891, a Nestlé brand since 1897
- F&N Evaporated Milk
- California Farms Evaporated Milk
- Rainbow Milk, a brand of Royal Friesland Foods
- Nordmilch AG (Now DMK Deutsches Milchkontor) - Germany
- Jerzee Evaporated Milk (purchased in 2006 from Diehl Food Products)
- O-AT-KA Evaporated Milk
- Ferdi Evaporated Milk (Malaysia)
- Vitalait Evaporated Milk (Senegal)
- Luna Evaporated Milk (Saudi Arabia)
- Gloria Evaporated Milk (Peru)

== See also ==
- Baked milk
- Condensed milk
- Filled milk
- John Augustus Just
- List of dried foods
- Powdered milk
- Scalded milk
