= Heytea =

Chinese tea drink chain

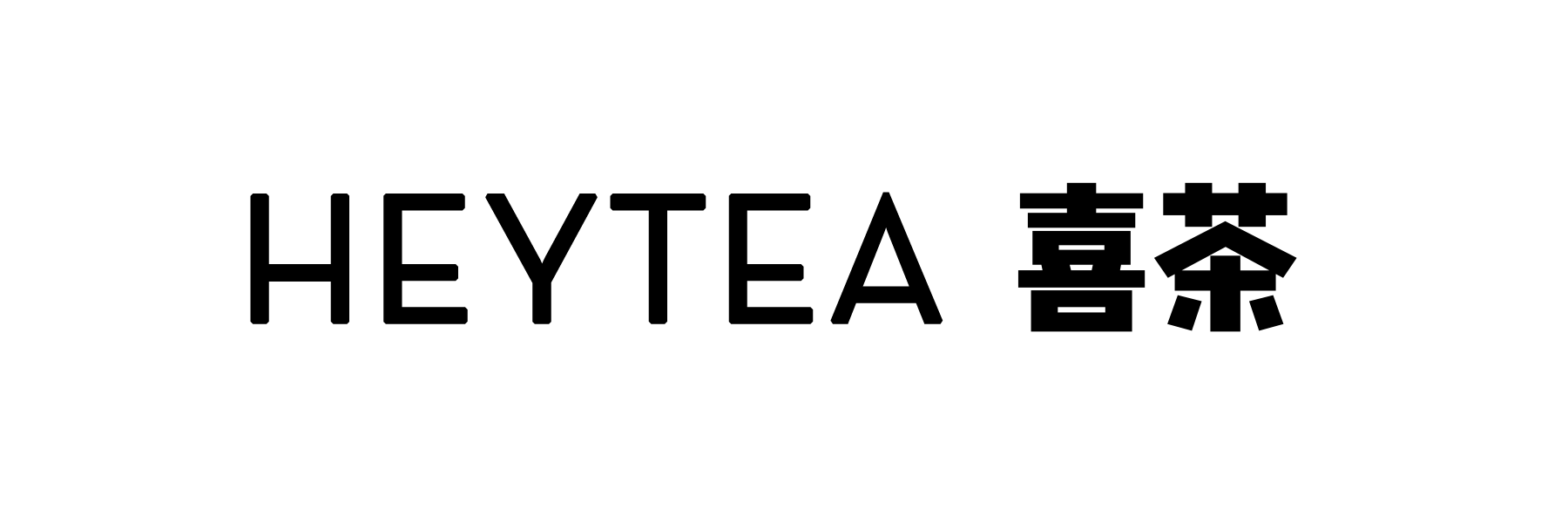

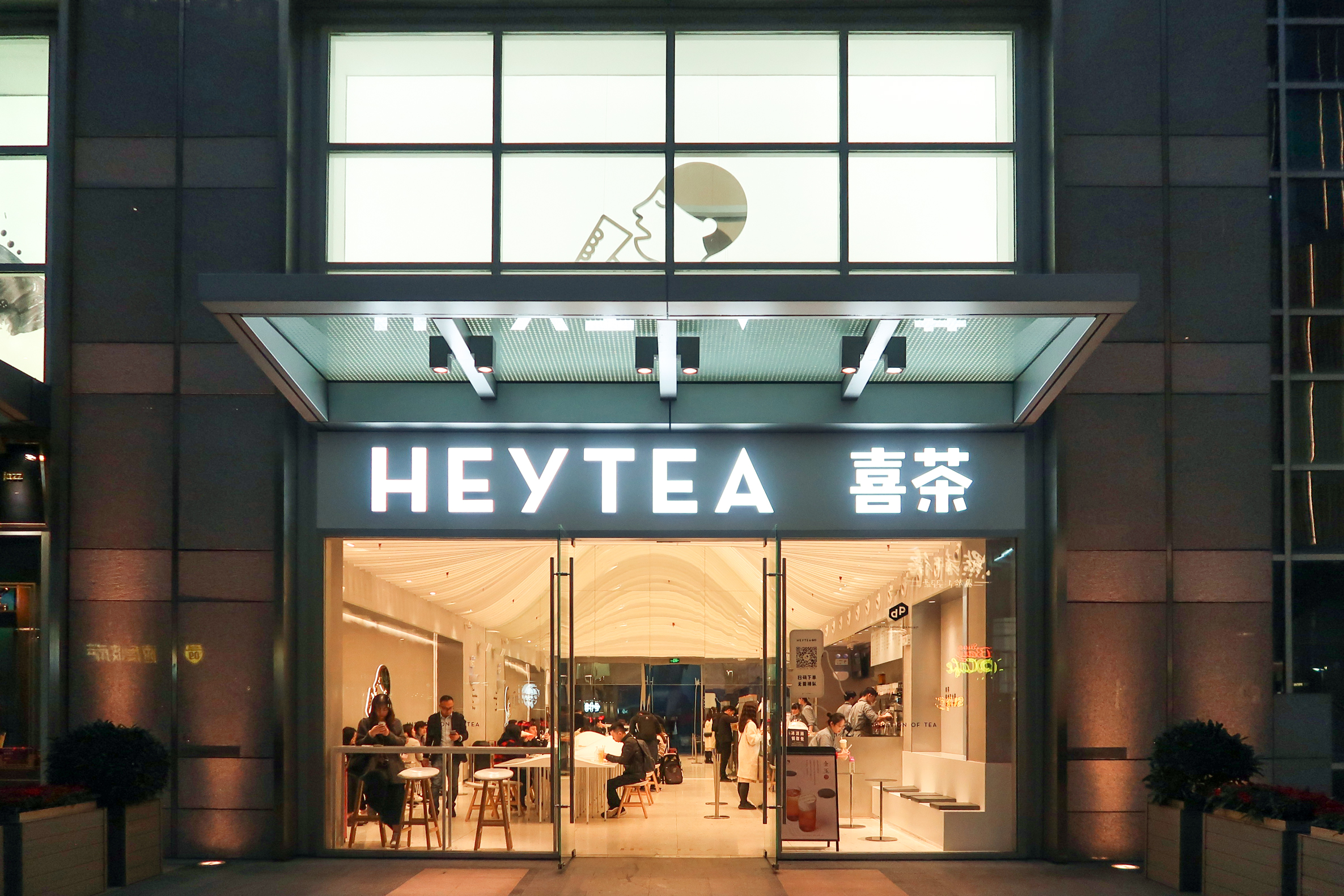
- HeyTea location in Guangzhou
- Type: Private
- Industry: Tea shops
- Founded: 2012 in Jiangmen
- Headquarters: Nanshan District, Shenzhen, China
- Parent: Shenzhen Meixixi Catering Management

Chinese name
- Simplified Chinese: 深圳美西西餐饮管理有限公司
- Traditional Chinese: 深圳美西西餐飲管理有限公司
- Literal meaning: Shenzhen Meixixi (Beautiful West West) Food and Beverage Management Co., Ltd.
Transcriptions
Standard Mandarin
- Hanyu Pinyin: Shēnzhèn Měixīxī Cānyǐn Guǎnlǐ Yǒuxiàngōngsī
Yue: Cantonese
- Jyutping: sam1 zan3 mei5 sai1 sai1 caan1 jam2 gun2 lei5 jau5 haan6 gung1 si1
- Website: www.heytea.com

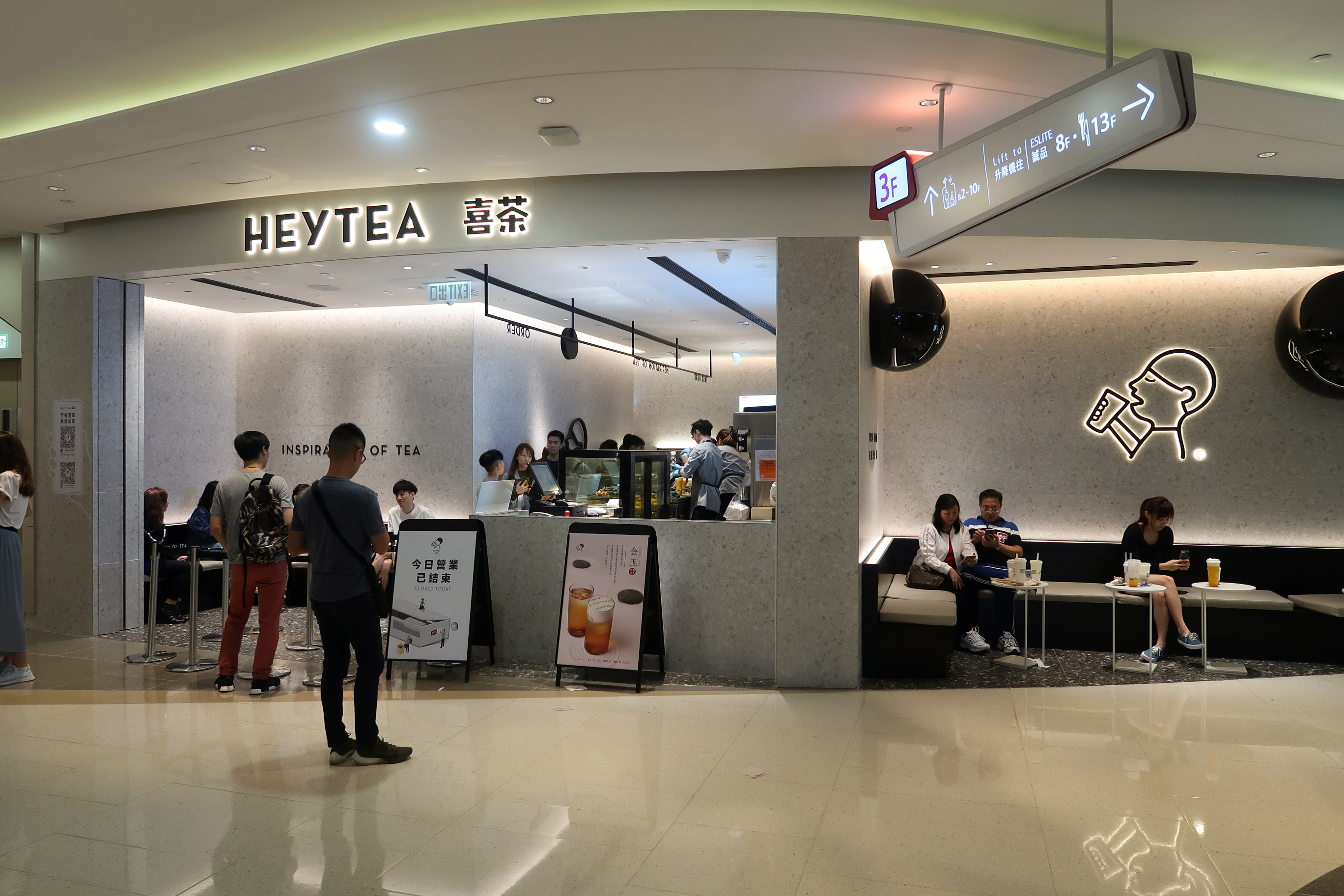
Heytea storefront

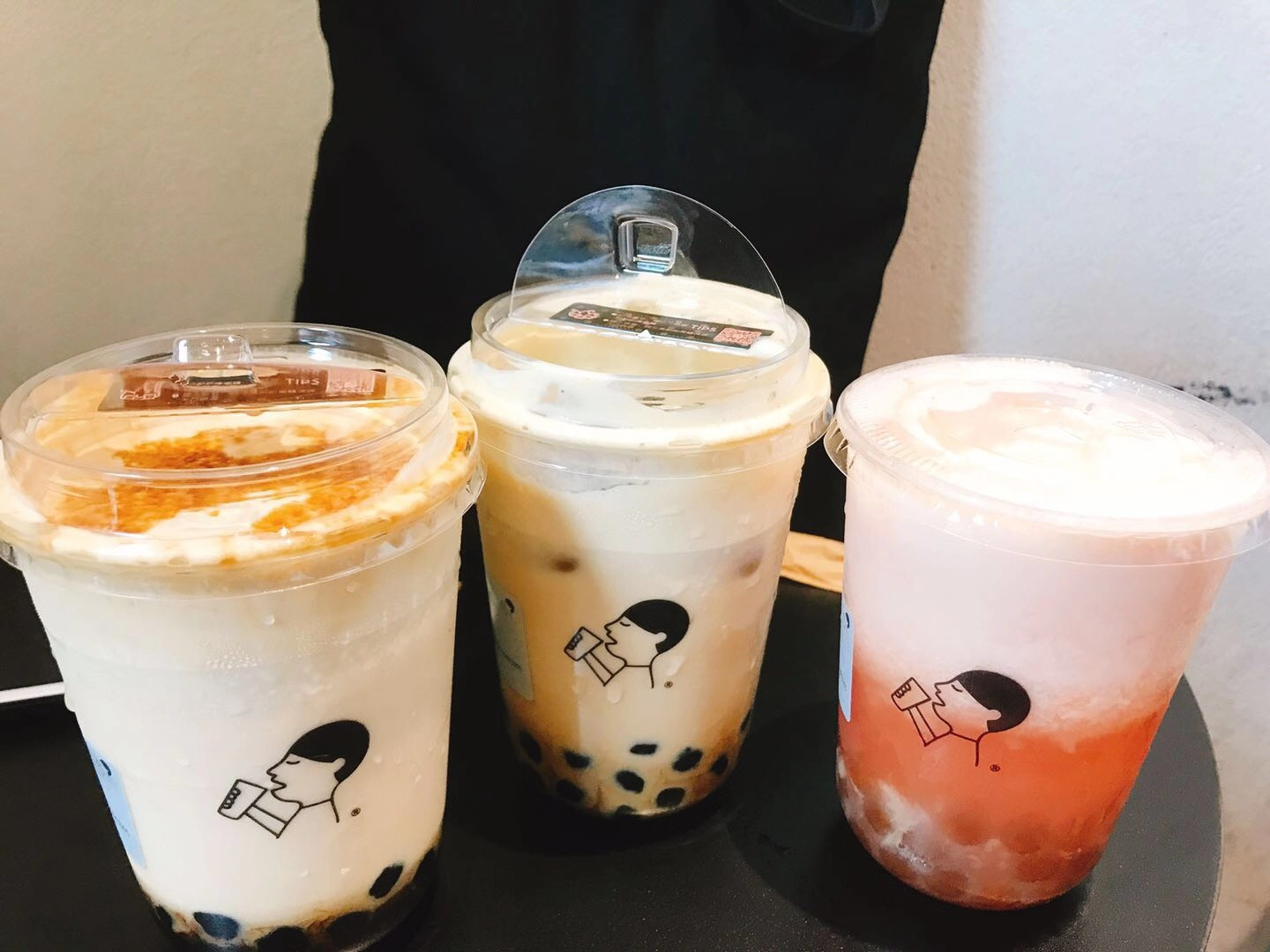
Drinks from Heytea

Heytea (Chinese: 喜茶; pinyin: Xǐ Chá; Jyutping: hei2 caa4; Cantonese Yale: Héi Chàh; lit. 'Happy Tea') is a Chinese tea beverage chain founded in 2012 and headquartered in Nanshan District, Shenzhen. Originally established as "Royal Tea" (Chinese: 皇茶; pinyin: Huáng Chá; Jyutping: wong4 caa4) in Jiangmen, Guangdong Province, the company quickly expanded across Guangdong and other regions of China. Following a trademark dispute, the brand was renamed "Heytea" in 2016. As of 2026, the chain operates over 4,000 locations, primarily in China.

Heytea is often classified as a "wanghong" brand due to its popularity on social media. It is known for its modern store design, photogenic packaging and innovative beverages, including cheese tea and fruit teas. Its signature cheese tea uses a mixture of New Zealand Anchor cheese, milk, cream and salt. The brand has locations in several countries like the US, UK, Australia, Canada, Singapore, Malaysia, and South Korea, as well as Hong Kong and Macau.

== History ==
Heytea opened in 2012 as Royal Tea in Jiangmen but rebranded to avoid trademark conflicts.

In 2015, the company expanded to the first-tier cities of Guangzhou and Shenzhen.

After receiving an investment of 100 million yuan from IDG Capital and angel investors in 2016, Heytea expanded into Guangxi.

The brand entered Shanghai in 2017, where the opening of its first store at Raffles City attracted significant attention on social media. However, it was later found that Heytea and competitor Alittle Tea both hired actors to create long lines. In the same year, its bakery concept, "Heytea Mix," launched in Guangzhou.

Heytea opened its first Hong Kong store in 2018 at New Town Plaza, later expanding to Hong Kong Times Square, Hysan Place, Yoho Mall, Yuen Long, and Citywalk. The chain now has locations across most first- and second-tier Chinese cities, as well as in Singapore.

In 2020, Adidas released a sneaker in collaboration with Heytea. The same year, Heytea also partnered with Fenty Beauty on a cream blush product.

In 2021, Heytea introduced a milk-tea product based on Eisbock milk.

In December 2023, Heytea entered the U.S. market with its first store in New York City. By January 2025, the chain had 15 stores in New York City.

== Stores ==
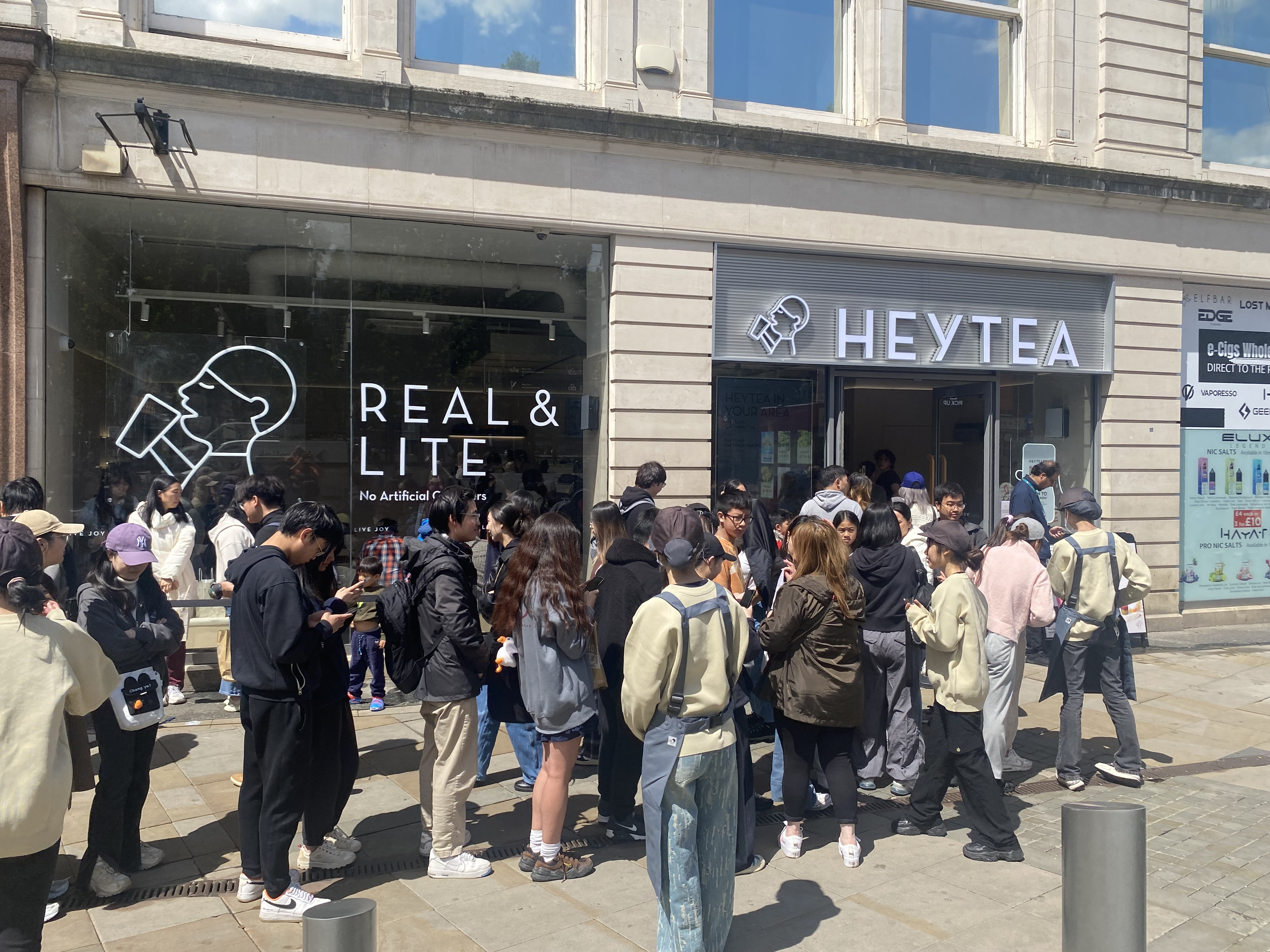
First day of Heytea Manchester Piccadilly Garden shop

=== Types of stores ===
- Standard Stores
- Heytea Lab: a Lab-style concept store. The first store was opened at Shenzhen Central town Square in October 2016
- Heytea Black: a black and gold themed store. The first store was opened at Shenzhen MixC in January 2017
- Heytea Mix: a store that mainly sells freshly baked bread. The first store was opened in March 2017 in Guangzhou
- Heytea Pink: a pink themed store that targets at young women. The first store was opened at Shenzhen Mixc in September 2017
- Heytea DP: a store that originates from Heytea Daydreamer Project. The store had a cross-border cooperation with independent designers. The first store was opened at Shenzhen Uniwalk in October 2017
- Heytea Go: a small size store that customers can order online through Hey Tea Go App

== Controversies ==
=== Food safety issues ===
As Heytea continued to expand, multiple outlets were successively reported for food safety issues. Between December 2018 and June 2019, a period of six months, the company was reported to have been involved in four separate sanitation incidents.

On 4 December 2018, a customer at the Shanghai HKRI Taikoo Hui outlet of Heytea reported finding a suspected “transparent finger cot”–like foreign object in their drink. The company subsequently responded that no similar transparent items were used in its packaging, staff attire, or utensils, and suggested that the issue may have been caused during delivery by an “unregulated errand runner.”

In 2019, a report found that 10 brands of pearl milk tea, including Heytea, contained caffeine at an average level of 258 mg/kg. Each cup of Heytea's milk tea was estimated to contain an amount of caffeine comparable to 3.5 cans of Red Bull.

In the same year, a pregnant woman in Suzhou reported finding a fly in a drink purchased at the Heytea store in Yuanrong. After unsuccessful negotiations with the company, she appealed to the media and regulatory authorities. On May 31, local authorities closed the Yuanrong store due to internal hygiene issues. On the same day, another Heytea location in Suzhou was also closed for similar hygiene violations.

Additionally, a supervision inspection at a Heytea store in Xiamen found excessive water on the kitchen floor, improperly stored fruits and containers with an ATP index (measured using ATP bioluminescence, a rapid method to assess organic matter and microbial contamination on surfaces, indicating potential food safety risks) significantly exceeding the prescribed standard.

=== Violent dispute ===
In September 2019, a video posted online showed a physical altercation between Heytea staff and a takeaway rider at a store in Jinan. The video depicted staff members using chairs and other objects during the conflict. The company later explained that the incident occurred around 13:00 on September 14 and stemmed from a misunderstanding while handling an order.
