= Sarcode =

Sarcode may refer to:

- Sarcode, an early concept to explain the make up of an amoeba
- Sarcode, an early description of protoplasm (Dujardin, 1835, 1841)
- Sarcode, a preparation in homeopathy

== See also ==
- Sarcoid (disambiguation)
