= Ryazhenka =

Fermented dairy beverage

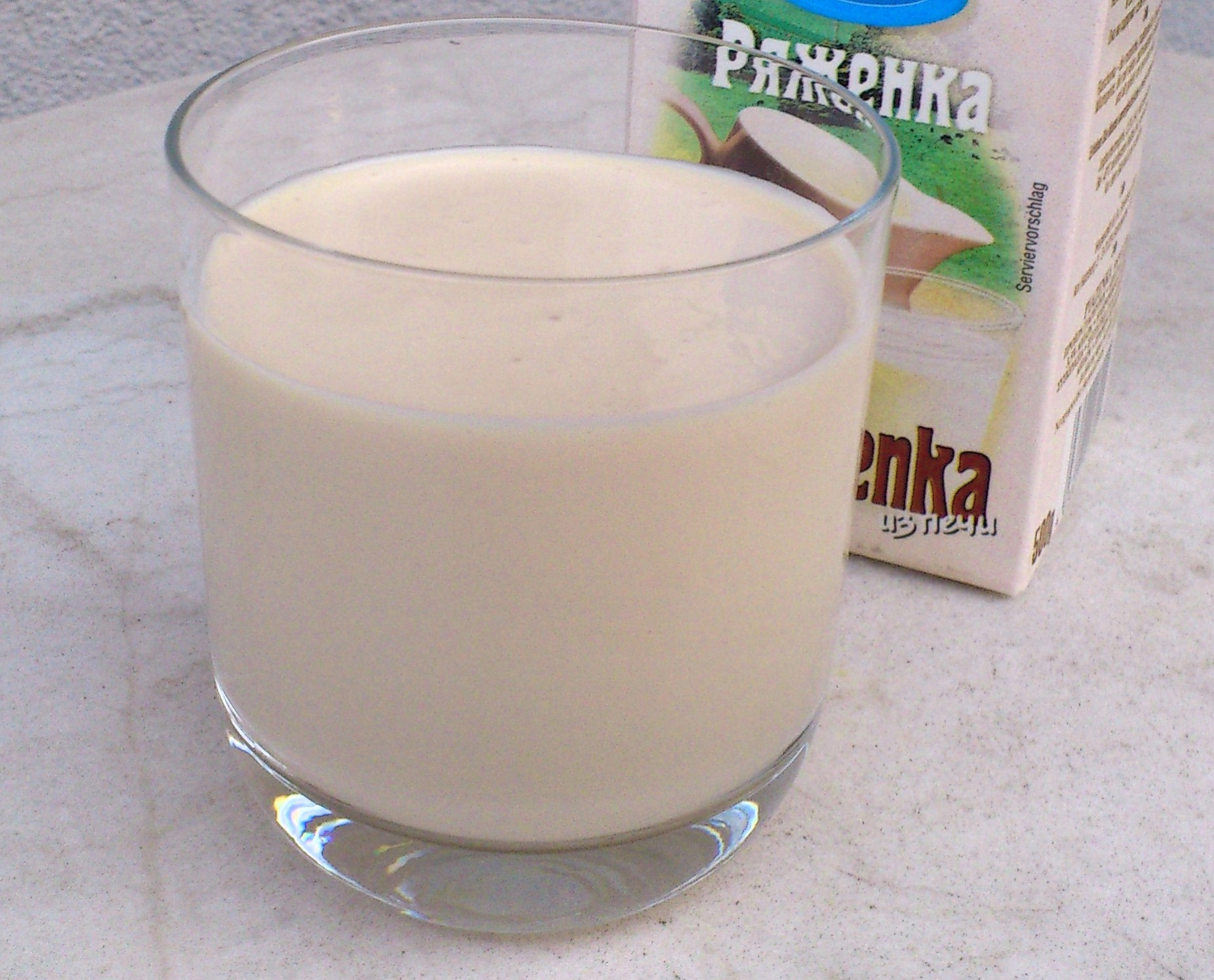
- Place of origin: Ukraine
- Associated cuisine: Belarusian; Russian; Ukrainian
- Main ingredients: Milk
Nutritional value
(per 100 g serving)
- Protein: ≥3 g
- Fat: 0.5−8.9 g
- Carbohydrate: 4−5 g

Ryazhenka or ryazhanka (Russian: ряженка; Belarusian: ражанка; Ukrainian: ряжанка), is a traditional fermented milk product in Ukraine, Russia, and Belarus. It is made from baked milk by lactic acid fermentation.

== Origin and etymology ==
Russian and Soviet sources call it "Little Russian ryazhenka", "Ukrainian ryazhenka", or "Ukrainian soured milk" (украинская простокваша, ukrainskaya prostokvasha) and attribute its origin to Ukrainian cuisine. The name is cognate with the Ukrainian "пряжений" as in "пряжене молоко" (pryazhene moloko, "baked milk").

=== Similar dairy products ===
Similar traditional products made by fermenting baked milk have been known in Russia as varenets. While some dictionaries define both names as synonyms, the industry standard GOST distinguishes between the two products, specifying somewhat different production processes.

Similar products include qatiq and kaymak, in Turkic countries. The milk is heated to a high temperature before fermentation, which is the main factor distinguishing ryazhenka, varenets, qatiq, and kaymak from yogurt-based drinks.

== Production ==
Ryazhenka is made by first pasteurizing milk before simmering it on low heat for eight hours, at minimum. Historically, this was done by placing a clay pot (hlechyk or krynka) with milk in a traditional Ukrainian oven for a day, until it was coated with a brown crust. Prolonged exposure to heat leads to the Maillard reaction between the milk's amino acids and sugars, resulting in the formation of melanoidin compounds that give it a creamy color and caramel flavor. A great deal of moisture evaporates, resulting in a change of consistency. In household production, sour cream (smetana) is subsequently added to trigger fermentation. In modern industrial production, pure thermophile bacterial cultures (Streptococcus thermophilus and Lactobacillus delbrueckii subsp. bulgaricus) are used instead. The mixture is then kept in a warm place; the fermentation occurs at temperatures above ca. 40 °C / 100 °F and usually takes from three to six hours.

The fat content of industrially produced ryazhenka is typically 3.5–4%, but in general, it is allowed to vary from <0.5% (if made from skimmed milk) up to 8.9%. The protein content is at least 3%. The carbohydrate content is usually 4–5%. Like scalded milk, ryazhenka is free of harmful bacteria and enzymes and can be stored safely at room temperature for up to forty hours.
