= Varenets =

Russian fermented dairy product

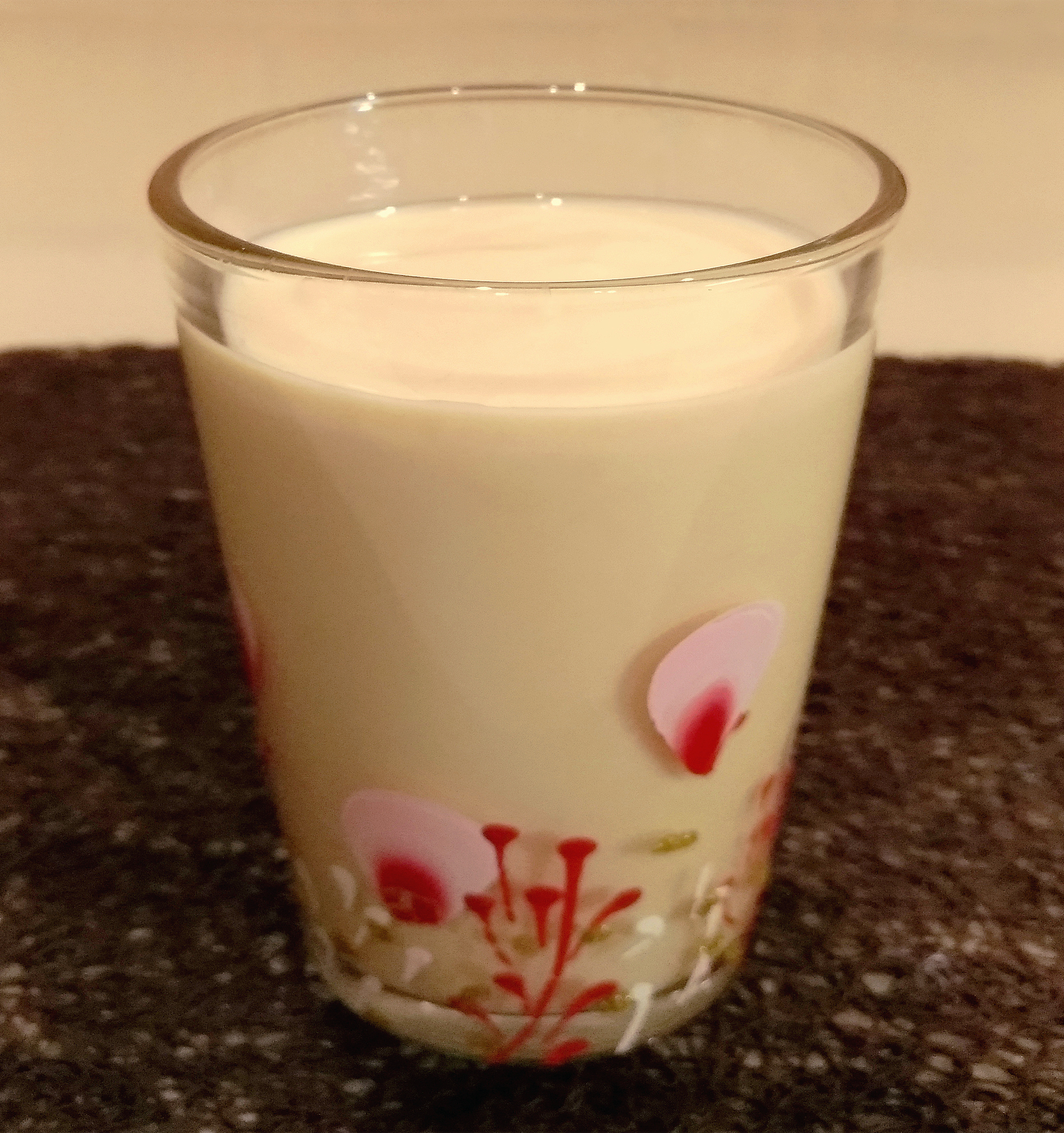
- Alternative names: Stewler, simmeler
- Place of origin: Russia
- Main ingredients: Milk

Varenets (Russian: варенец, lit. 'the stewed one'), sometimes anglicised as stewler or simmeler, is a fermented milk product that is popular in Russia. Similar to ryazhenka, it is made by adding sour cream (smetana) to baked milk.

== Production ==
Varenets is a fermented dairy drink with a caramel taste and creamy color. Varenets was traditionally produced by baking milk in a Russian oven and fermenting it with sour cream.

Commercially available cultured varenets is milk that has been pasteurized and homogenized (with 0.5% to 8.9% fat), and then inoculated with a culture of Streptococcus thermophilus to simulate the naturally occurring bacteria in the old-fashioned product.

== Similar dairy products ==
Ryazhenka is the Russian word for a very similar fermented dairy product. While some dictionaries treat these two words as synonyms, the industry standard GOST distinguishes between the two products, specifying somewhat different production processes.

Also similar are qatiq and kaymak, commonly found in Turkic countries. The milk should be heated to a high temperature before fermentation. This is the main similarity of ryazhenka, varenets, qatiq, and kaymak that distinguishes it from other yogurt-based products, although kaymak and qatiq are thicker in consistency.

== See also ==
- List of dairy products
- List of Russian dishes
- List of yogurt-based dishes and beverages
