= Scalded milk =

Heat-treated milk

Scalded milk is dairy milk that has been heated to 83 °C (181 °F). At this temperature, bacteria are killed, enzymes in the milk are destroyed, and many of the proteins are denatured. Since most milk sold today is pasteurized, which accomplishes the first two goals, milk is typically scalded to increase its temperature, or to change the consistency or other cooking interactions by the denaturing of proteins.

During scalding, a cooking utensil known as a milk watcher may be used to prevent both boiling over and scorching (burning) of the milk.

== Uses ==
=== Béchamel sauce ===
Scalded milk is called for in the original recipes for Béchamel sauce, as adding hot liquid, including milk, to a roux was thought less likely to make a lumpy sauce or one tasting of raw flour.

=== Bread ===
Scalded and cooled milk is used in bread and other yeast doughs, as pasteurization does not kill all bacteria, and with the wild yeasts that may also be present, these can alter the texture and flavor. Recipes old enough to have been based on hand-milked, slowly cooled, unpasteurized milk specify scalded milk with much more justification, and modern cookbooks tend to maintain the tradition. In addition, scalding milk improves the rise due to inhibition of bread rise by certain undenatured milk proteins.

=== Yogurt ===
Scalded milk is used in yogurt to make the proteins unfold, and to make sure that all organisms that could outcompete the yogurt culture's bacteria are killed. In traditional yogurt making, as done in the Eastern Mediterranean and Near East, the milk is often heated in flat pans until reduced to about half. Whatever the effect of scalding on milk protein may be, it is mainly this concentrating that reduces whey separation. Modern commercial processors use dried or concentrated milk or vegetable gums and gelatins such as pectin, carrageenan, or agar ("vegetable gelatin") to prevent whey separation in yogurt.

=== Other uses ===
- New Orleans-style Café au lait and baked milk use scalded milk, ryazhenka uses baked milk.
- Scalded and cooled milk is used in many recipes for raised doughnuts, probably for the same reason it is so often specified in bread recipes.

However, latte art does not use scalded milk, as scalding destroys the microfoam texture; milk for latte art is heated to below the scalding point.

== See also ==
- Baked milk
- Condensed milk
- Eisbock milk
- Evaporated milk
- Powdered milk
- Clotted cream
- Warm milk
