= Yihetang =

Chinese bubble tea chain

Yihetang (Chinese: 益禾堂; pinyin: Yìhétáng), sometimes stylized as YH.TANG, is a Chinese bubble tea chain offering baked milk products. It was founded in 2012. As of 2024 the company has over 8000 franchises throughout China, with locations in Vietnam, Thailand, and Malaysia.

== Products ==
Yihetang is known for milk teas prepared using caramelized baked milk. According to Supermarket News, Yihetang and Mixue Ice Cream & Tea "dominate" the "fresh-made tea drink" segment in Southern China.

== Organization ==
Yihetang is a tea beverage brand under Wuhan Yihuiyin Technology Co., Ltd., founded in 2012. Yihetang mainly operates in a franchise mode. In 2013, Yihetang opened up chain franchise. In April 2018, Wuhan Yihuiyin Technology Co., Ltd. was established.

== History and growth ==
Hu Jihong (also translated as Hu Ji Hong) opened a beverage store called Changyingang in 2006. In 2012, Wuhan Yihuiyin Technology Co., Ltd. officially established Yihetang brand. In 2017, Yihetang had more than 1,000 stores in China, covering more than 100 cities in 26 provincial regions. By 2019 Yihetang had 4000 stores.

In 2021, Yihetang underwent its sixth comprehensive upgrade, with Olympic champion Lv Xiaojun becoming a spokesperson. By 2022 it had over 5000 franchises.

By 2024, the number of contracted stores in China had surpassed 8,000 with locations opened in other countries in Southeast Asia, including Vietnam, Thailand, and Malaysia.

== Controversies ==
The company has been plagued by food safety issues at its franchises. On May 5, 2022, some of Yihetang's stores in Zhengzhou, Henan Province, used expired and moldy ingredients and had food hygiene issues such as tampering with the shelf life of opened materials. On May 6, Yihetang's official Weibo account issued an apology statement, saying that it had terminated its cooperation with the franchisee involved and had closed the store involved.

In July 2021, Yihetang's new product promotional copy, such as "a cup this big is enough for three or four of your secretaries to drink" and "the quality of a flight attendant but the price of Jixiang Village", referring to a notorious red-light district in Xi'an, was questioned for insulting women and being vulgar. On July 25, Yihetang issued an apology letter, saying that due to some inappropriate words in the original video, misunderstandings had been caused, which had brought a very bad feeling to everyone. The brand expressed deep guilt and had deleted and removed the relevant videos from various platforms.

== Infringement issue ==
Yihetang entered the Vietnamese market in 2019 and has more than 30 stores. Yihetang's success in the Vietnamese market also brought about the problem of counterfeit and shoddy products. In order to protect the rights and interests of brands and consumers, Yihetang has clarified the authorization of Vietnamese branch as the only official port, and has established a rights protection team and a scientific rights protection system to combat infringement in the market.
