= Melanoidin =

Polymers formed from sugars and amino acids in certain conditions

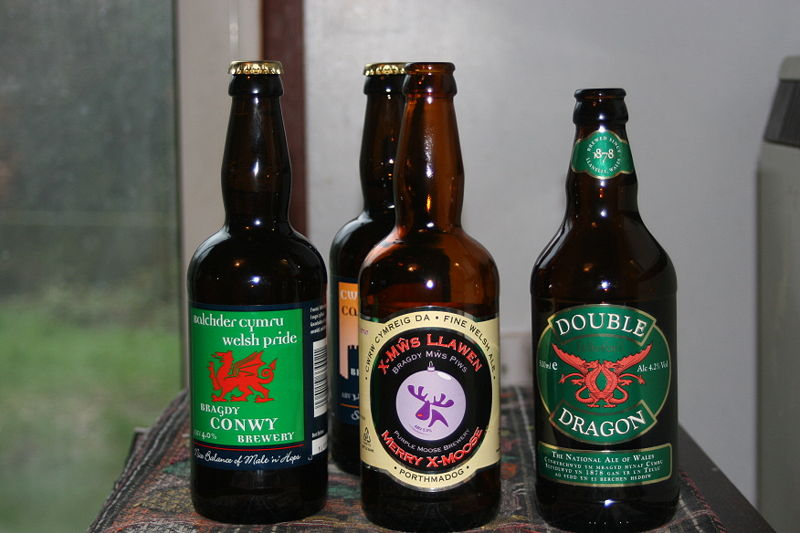
Foods containing toasted barley malt, such as some beers, are one source of melanoidins.

Melanoidins (Note: From Greek melas, black, dark (which also gives rise to melanin); eidos, resembling, like (which also gives rise to sarcoid, coracoid); and a common suffix in biochemistry used for chemicals -in (as in protein, keratin). Overall the word refers to "a dark colored chemical which looks like melanin".) are brown, high molecular weight heterogeneous polymers that are formed when sugars and amino acids combine (through the Maillard reaction) at high temperatures and low water activity. They were discovered by Schmiedeberg in 1897. Melanoidins are commonly present in foods that have undergone some form of non-enzymatic browning, such as barley malts (Vienna and Munich), bread crust, bakery products, and coffee. They are also present in the wastewater of sugar refineries, necessitating treatment in order to avoid contamination around the outflow of these refineries.

Some of the melanoidins are metabolized by the intestinal microflora.

Coffee is one of the main sources of melanoidins in the human diet, yet coffee consumption is associated with some health benefits and antiglycative action.
