= Sarcoid =

Sarcoid may refer to:

- relating to Sarcoidosis, a non-infectious granulomatous disease
- Equine sarcoids, skin cancer in horses

== See also ==
- Sarcoma, a type of cancer
- Sarcode (disambiguation)
