= Baked milk =

Beverage derived from milk

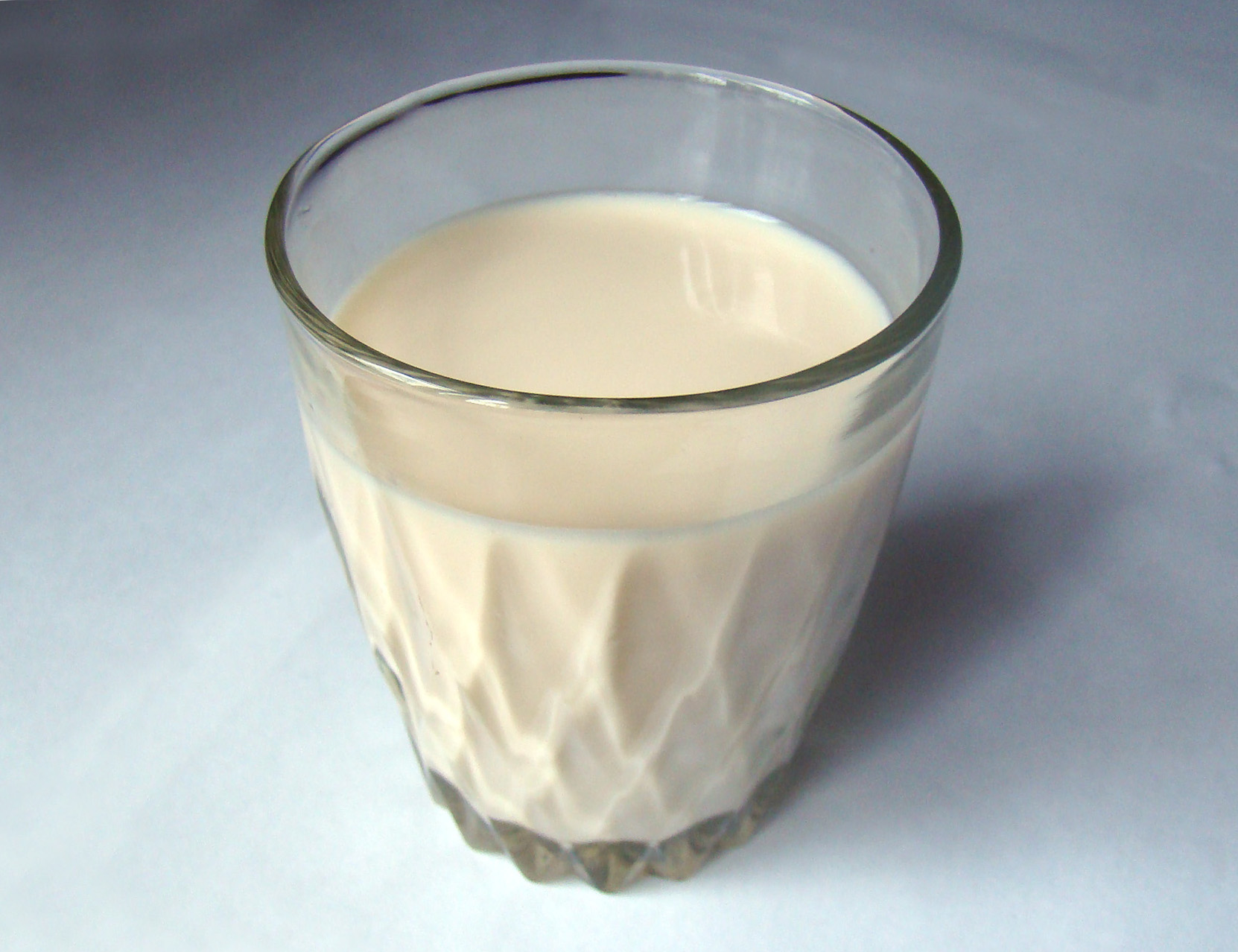
A glass of baked milk

Baked milk (Russian: топлёное молоко [tɐˈplʲɵnəjə məɫɐˈko]; Ukrainian: пряжене молоко; Belarusian: топленае малако) is a variety of boiled milk that has been particularly popular in Russia, Ukraine and Belarus. It is made by simmering milk on low heat for eight hours or longer.

== History ==
Baked milk was relatively popular outside of Russia as well. It was deemed more palatable than boiled milk, and was described in medical literature as potentially more digestible. The most simple recipe suggested by 19th-century cookbooks for baked milk instructed one to leave milk in an oven overnight; however more elaborate recipes could be found as well.

In rural areas, baked milk has been produced by leaving a jug of boiled milk in an oven for a day or overnight until it is coated with a brown crust. Prolonged exposure to heat causes reactions between the milk's amino acids and sugars, resulting in the formation of melanoidin compounds that give it a creamy color and caramel flavor. A great deal of moisture evaporates, resulting in a change of consistency. The stove in a traditional Russian loghouse (izba) sustains "varying cooking temperatures based on the placement of the food inside the oven".

Today, baked milk is produced on an industrial scale. Like scalded milk, it is free of bacteria and enzymes and can be stored safely at room temperature for up to forty hours. Home-made baked milk is used for preparing a range of cakes, pies, and cookies.

Long term consumption of baked milk may help for resolution of milk allergy. However, in some cases, acquired tolerance reverts to unresolved allergy.

== Fermented baked milk ==
Ryazhenka and varenets are fermented baked milk products, a type of traditional yoghurt. It is a common breakfast drink in Ukraine, Belarus, and Russia.

In peasant communities, varenets has been made in the traditional East Slavic oven by "baking sour milk to a golden brown color". In the Soviet era, the name "ryazhenka" came to be applied to a government-produced creme-colored drink without the skin.

== In China ==
In China, the Yihetang chain popularized baked milk (Chinese: 烤奶; pinyin: kǎo nǎi) as an ingredient in bubble tea.

== See also ==
- Dulce de leche, a similar preparation used in home-made pastries
- List of baked goods
