= Hungary =

Country in Central Europe

Hungary Magyarország
- Flag Coat of arms
- Anthem: "Himnusz" (English: "Hymn")
- Location of Hungary (dark green) – in Europe (green & dark grey) – in the European Union (green)
- Capital and largest city: Budapest; 47°26′N 19°15′E
- Official languages: Hungarian
- Ethnic groups (2022 census (Note: Multiple answer was available in the census, hence the total may add to more than 100%.) (Note: Excludes the population who did not answer the question (13.7%))): 97.7% Hungarian; 2.4% Romani; 1.2% German; 1.3% other
- Religion (2022 census): 42.5% Christianity; 29.2% Catholicism; 13.3% other Christian; 40.1% no answer; 16.1% irreligion; 1.3% others
- Demonyms: Hungarian; Magyar
- Government: Unitary parliamentary republic
  - President: András Baka
  - Prime Minister: Péter Magyar
  - Speaker of the National Assembly: Ágnes Forsthoffer
- Legislature: Országgyűlés

Formation
  - Hungarian conquest of the Carpathian Basin: 862–895
  - Principality of Hungary: 895
  - Christian Kingdom: 25 December 1000
  - Golden Bull of 1222: 24 April 1222
  - Battle of Mohács: 29 August 1526
  - Liberation of Buda: 2 September 1686
  - Revolution of 1848: 15 March 1848
  - Austria-Hungary: 30 March 1867
  - Restoration of Independence: 31 October 1918
  - Treaty of Trianon: 4 June 1920
  - Third Republic: 23 October 1989

Area
  - Total: 93,030 km^{2} (35,920 sq mi) (108th)
  - Water (%): 3.7

Population
  - January 2026 estimate: ▼9,489,000 (96th)
  - 2022 census: 9,603,634
  - Density: 102/km^{2} (264.2/sq mi) (111th)
- GDP (PPP): 2026 estimate
  - Total: ▲$486.618 billion (56th)
  - Per capita: ▲$51,028 (46th)
- GDP (nominal): 2026 estimate
  - Total: ▲$265.911 billion (53rd)
  - Per capita: ▲$27,884 (50th)
- Gini (2023): ▲29.0 low inequality
- HDI (2023): ▲0.870 very high (46th)
- Currency: Forint (HUF)
- Time zone: UTC+1 (CET)
  - Summer (DST): UTC+2 (CEST)
- Calling code: +36
- ISO 3166 code: HU
- Internet TLD: .hu

Hungary (Note: Hungarian: Magyarország [ˈmɒɟɒrorsaːɡ]) is a landlocked country in Central Europe. Spanning much of the Carpathian Basin, it is bordered by Slovakia to the north, Ukraine to the northeast, Romania to the east and southeast, Serbia to the south, Croatia and Slovenia to the southwest, and Austria to the west. Hungary lies within the Danube River's drainage basin and is dominated by great lowland plains. It has a population of over 9.5 million, consisting mostly of ethnic Hungarians (Magyars) and a significant Romani minority. Hungarian is the official language and among the few in Europe outside the Indo-European family. Budapest is the country's capital, largest city, and cultural and economic centre.

Before the establishment of the Hungarian state, the territory was settled by various groups, including Celts, Romans, Huns, Germanic peoples, Avars, and Slavs. Statehood began in the late ninth century with the Principality of Hungary, which became a medieval Christian kingdom under King Stephen I in 1000. After it was defeated by the Ottoman Empire at the Battle of Mohács in 1526, the kingdom was split into three regions for over 150 years until its reunion under Habsburg rule before the turn of the 18th century. Several uprisings against the Habsburgs precipitated the formation of the Austro-Hungarian Monarchy in the Compromise of 1867; Austria-Hungary remained a European great power until World War I. Hungary's modern borders were then established by the 1920 Treaty of Trianon, which resulted in severe losses for the country, including 71% of its historical territory and the majority of its economy and population; a third of ethnic Hungarians were left outside the new borders.

Hungary endured turmoil in the early interwar period, culminating in the national-conservative regime of regent Miklós Horthy. Hungary joined the Axis powers in World War II, suffering significant damage and casualties. After a brief Soviet occupation, the Hungarian People's Republic was established in 1949 as a satellite state inside the Warsaw Pact. Subsequent political repression and economic stagnation led to the unsuccessful Hungarian Revolution of 1956, though communist rule softened in the following decades. During the Revolutions of 1989, Hungary peacefully transitioned into a democratic parliamentary republic. It joined the European Union (EU) in 2004 and the Schengen Area in 2007. Under the leadership of Viktor Orbán and Fidesz from 2010 to 2026, the country experienced democratic backsliding.

Hungary is a high-income economy with universal health care and tuition-free tertiary education. It has a long history of significant contributions to arts, music, literature, sports, and science and technology. As a popular tourist destination in Europe, Hungary had 24.5 million international visitors in 2019. Hungary is a member of numerous international organizations, including the Council of Europe, EU, NATO, United Nations, World Health Organization, World Trade Organization, World Bank, Asian Infrastructure Investment Bank, and the Visegrád Group.

== Etymology ==
The "H" in the name of Hungary is most likely derived from historical associations with the Huns, who had settled Hungary prior to the Avars. The rest of the word comes from the Latinised form of Byzantine Greek Oungroi (Οὔγγροι). The Greek name might be borrowed from Old Slavonic ągrinŭ, in turn borrowed from Oghur-Turkic Onogur ('ten [tribes of the] Ogurs'). Onogur was the collective name for the tribes who later joined the Bulgar tribal confederacy that ruled the eastern parts of Hungary after the Avars. Peter B. Golden also considers the suggestion of Árpád Berta that the name derives from Khazar Turkic ongar (oŋ "right", oŋar- "to make something better, to put (it) right", oŋgar- "to make something better, to put (it) right", oŋaru "towards the right") "right wing". This points to the idea that the Magyar Union before the Conquest formed the "right wing" (western wing) of the Khazar military forces.

The Hungarian endonym is Magyarország, composed of magyar ('Hungarian') and ország ('country'). The name "Magyar", which refers to the people of the country, more accurately reflects the name of the country in some other languages such as Turkish, Persian and other languages as Magyaristan or Land of Magyars or similar. The word magyar is taken from the name of the leading tribe of the seven major semi-nomadic Hungarian tribes.

== History ==
=== Before 895 ===
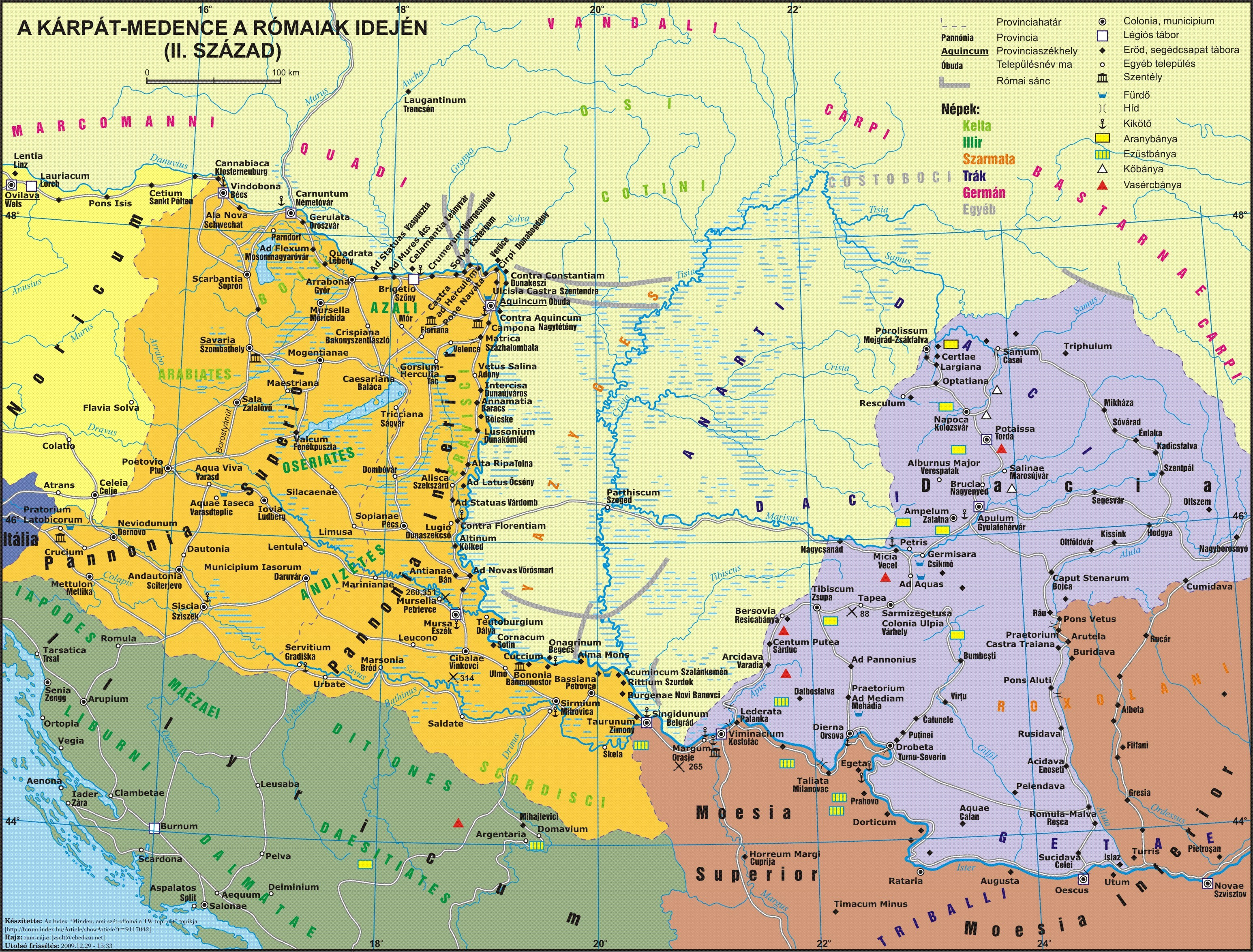
Roman provinces and barbarian peoples in and near the Carpathian Basin in the 2nd century AD

The Roman Empire conquered the territory between the Alps and the area west of the Danube River from 16 to 15 BC, the Danube being the frontier of the empire. In 14 BC, Pannonia, the western part of the Carpathian Basin, which includes the west of today's Hungary, was recognised by emperor Augustus in the Res Gestae Divi Augusti as part of the Roman Empire. The area south-east of Pannonia was organised as the Roman province Moesia in 6 BC. An area east of the river Tisza became the Roman province of Dacia in 106 AD, which included today's east Hungary. It remained under Roman rule until 271.

From 235, the Roman Empire went through troubled times, caused by revolts, rivalry and rapid succession of emperors. The Western Roman Empire collapsed in the 5th century under the stress of the migration of Germanic tribes and Carpian pressure. This period brought many invaders into Central Europe, beginning with the Hunnic Empire (c. 370–469). The most powerful ruler of the Hunnic Empire was Attila the Hun (434–453), who later became a central figure in Hungarian mythology. After the disintegration of the Hunnic Empire, the Gepids, an Eastern Germanic tribe, who had been vassalised by the Huns, established their own kingdom in the Carpathian Basin. Other groups which reached the Carpathian Basin during the Migration Period were the Goths, Vandals, Lombards, and Slavs.

In the 560s, the Avars founded the Avar Khaganate, a state that maintained supremacy in the region for more than two centuries. The Franks under Charlemagne defeated the Avars in a series of campaigns during the 790s. Between 804 and 829, the First Bulgarian Empire conquered the lands east of the Danube and took over the rule of the local Slavic tribes and remnants of the Avars. By the mid-9th century, the Balaton Principality, also known as Lower Pannonia, was established west of the Danube as part of the Frankish March of Pannonia.

=== Middle Ages (895–1526) ===
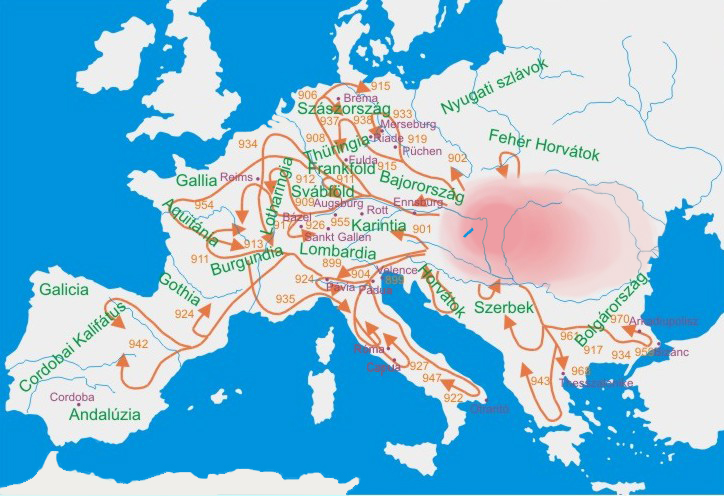
Hungarian raids in the 9–10th centuries: Between 899 and 970, the researchers count 47 (38 to West and 9 to East) raids in different parts of Europe. From these campaigns only 8 were unsuccessful and the others ended with success.

The foundation of the Hungarian state is connected to the Hungarian conquerors, who arrived from the Pontic-Caspian steppe as a confederation of seven tribes. The Hungarians arrived in the Carpathian Basin as a branch of a strong centralised steppe-empire under the leadership of Grand Prince Álmos and his son Árpád: founders of the Árpád dynasty, the Hungarian ruling dynasty and the Hungarian state. The Árpád dynasty claimed to be a direct descendant of Attila the Hun. The Hungarians took possession of the area in a pre-planned manner, with a long move-in between 862 and 895. The rising Hungary conducted successful fierce campaigns and raids, from Constantinople to as far as today's Spain. The Hungarians defeated three major East Frankish imperial armies between 907 and 910. A defeat at the Battle of Lechfeld in 955 signalled a provisory end to most campaigns on foreign territories, at least towards the west.

==== Age of Árpádian kings ====
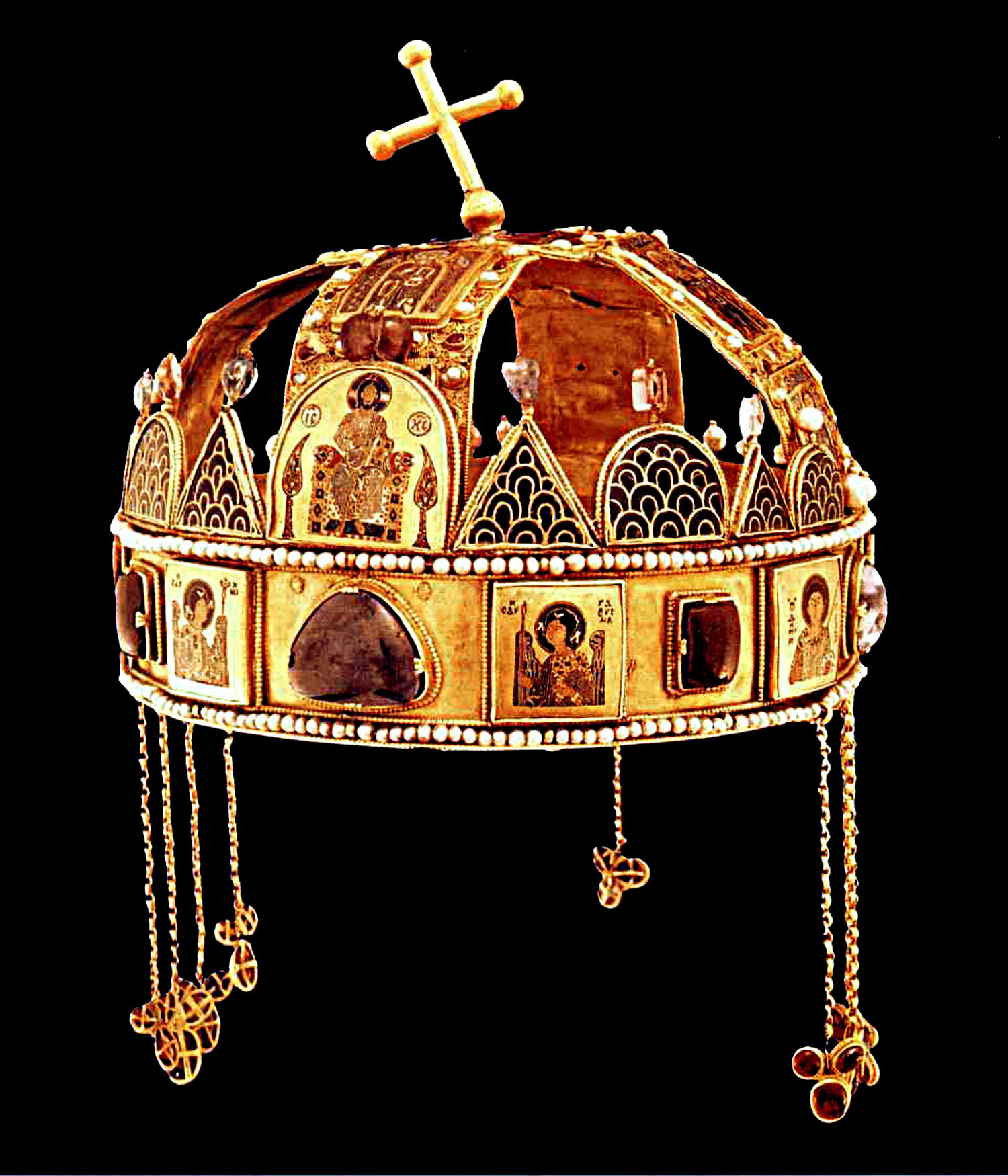
The Holy Crown (Szent Korona), one of the key symbols of Hungary. It was gifted to Saint Stephen, the first King of Hungary, who converted the nation to Christianity.

In 972, the ruling prince (Hungarian: fejedelem) Géza of the Árpád dynasty officially started to integrate Hungary into Christian Western Europe. His son Saint Stephen I became the first King of Hungary after defeating his pagan uncle Koppány. Under Stephen, Hungary was recognised as a Catholic Apostolic Kingdom. Applying to Pope Sylvester II, Stephen received the insignia of royalty (including probably a part of the Holy Crown of Hungary) from the papacy.

By 1006, Stephen consolidated his power and started sweeping reforms to convert Hungary into a Western-style feudal state. The country switched to using Latin for administration purposes, and until as late as 1844, Latin remained the official language of administration. King Saint Ladislaus completed the work of King Saint Stephen, consolidating the Hungarian state's power and strengthening Christianity. His charismatic personality, strategic leadership, and military talents resulted in the termination of internal power struggles and foreign military threats. The wife of the Croatian king Demetrius Zvonimir was Ladislaus's sister. At Helen's request, Ladislaus intervened in the conflict and invaded Croatia in 1091. The Kingdom of Croatia entered a personal union with the Kingdom of Hungary in 1102 with the coronation of King Coloman as "King of Croatia and Dalmatia" in 1102 in Biograd.

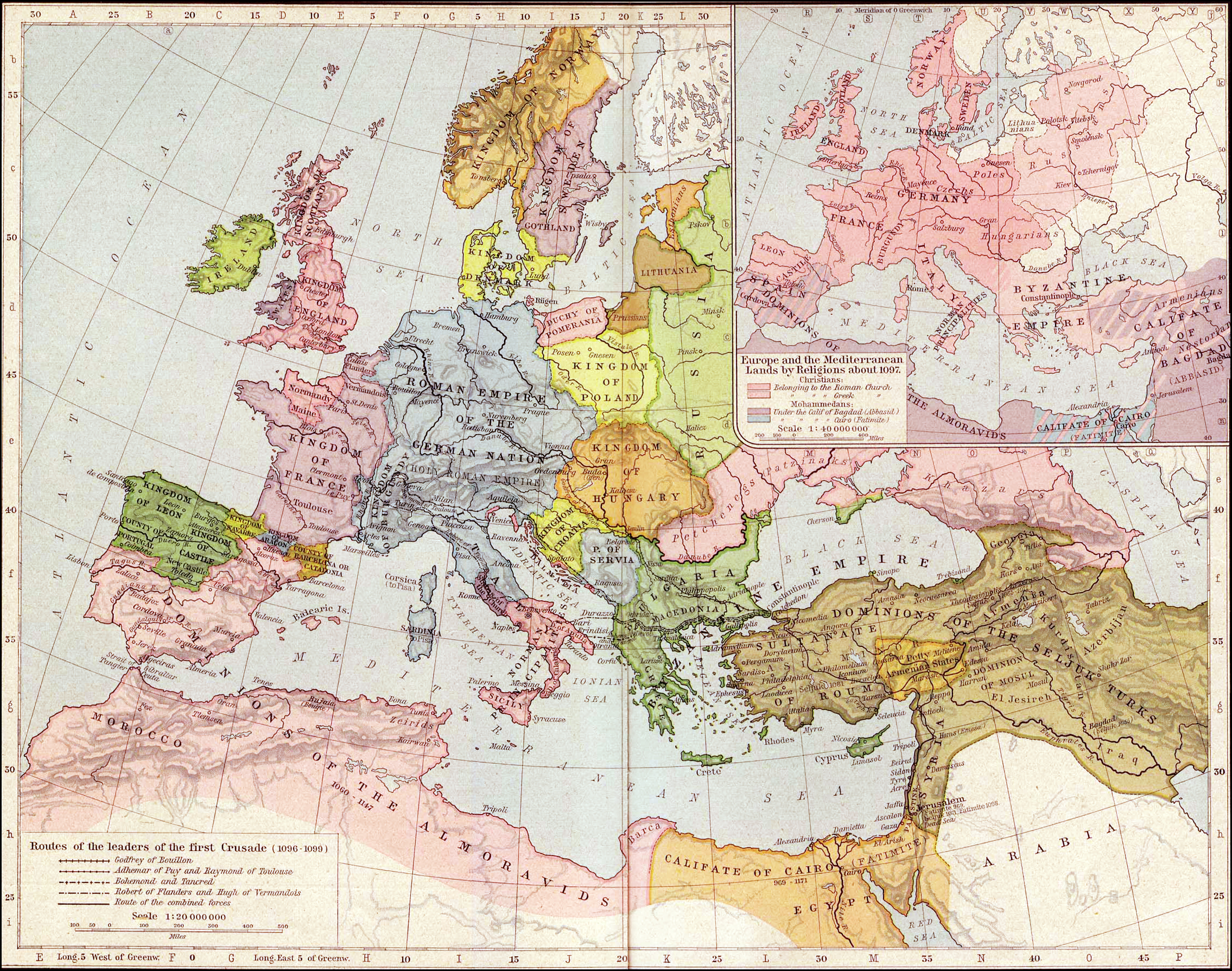
Europe in 1097

One of the most powerful and wealthiest kings of the Árpád dynasty was Béla III, who disposed of the equivalent of 23 tonnes of silver per year, according to a contemporary income register. This exceeded the income of the French king (estimated at 17 tonnes) and was double the receipts of the English Crown. Andrew II issued the Diploma Andreanum which secured the special privileges of the Transylvanian Saxons and is considered the first autonomy law in the world. He led the Fifth Crusade to the Holy Land in 1217, setting up the largest royal army in the history of Crusades. His Golden Bull of 1222 was the first constitution in Continental Europe. The lesser nobles also began to present Andrew with grievances, a practice that evolved into the institution of the parliament (parlamentum publicum).

In 1241–1242, the kingdom received a major blow with the Mongol (Tatar) invasion. Up to half of Hungary's population of 2 million were victims of the invasion. King Béla IV let Cumans and Jassic people, who were fleeing the Mongols, into the country. Over the centuries, they were fully assimilated. After the Mongols retreated, King Béla ordered the construction of hundreds of stone castles and fortifications, to defend against a possible second Mongol invasion. The Mongols returned to Hungary in 1285, but the newly built stone-castle systems and new tactics (using a higher proportion of heavily armed knights) stopped them. The invading Mongol force was defeated near Pest by the royal army of King Ladislaus IV. As with later invasions, it was repelled handily, the Mongols losing much of their invading force.

==== Age of elected kings ====
The Kingdom of Hungary reached one of its greatest extents during the Árpádian kings, yet royal power was weakened at the end of their rule in 1301. After a destructive period of interregnum (1301–1308), the first Angevin king, Charles I of Hungary – a bilineal descendant of the Árpád dynasty – successfully restored royal power and defeated oligarch rivals, the so-called "little kings". The second Angevin Hungarian king, Louis the Great (1342–1382), led many successful military campaigns from Lithuania to southern Italy (Kingdom of Naples) and was also King of Poland from 1370. After King Louis died without a male heir, the country was stabilised only when Sigismund of Luxembourg (1387–1437) succeeded to the throne, who in 1433 also became Holy Roman Emperor. The first Hungarian Bible translation was completed in 1439. For half a year in 1437, there was an antifeudal and anticlerical peasant revolt in Transylvania which was strongly influenced by Hussite ideas. From a small noble family in Transylvania, John Hunyadi grew to become one of the country's most powerful lords, thanks to his capabilities as a mercenary commander. He was elected governor, then regent. He was a successful crusader against the Ottoman Turks, one of his greatest victories being the siege of Belgrade in 1456.

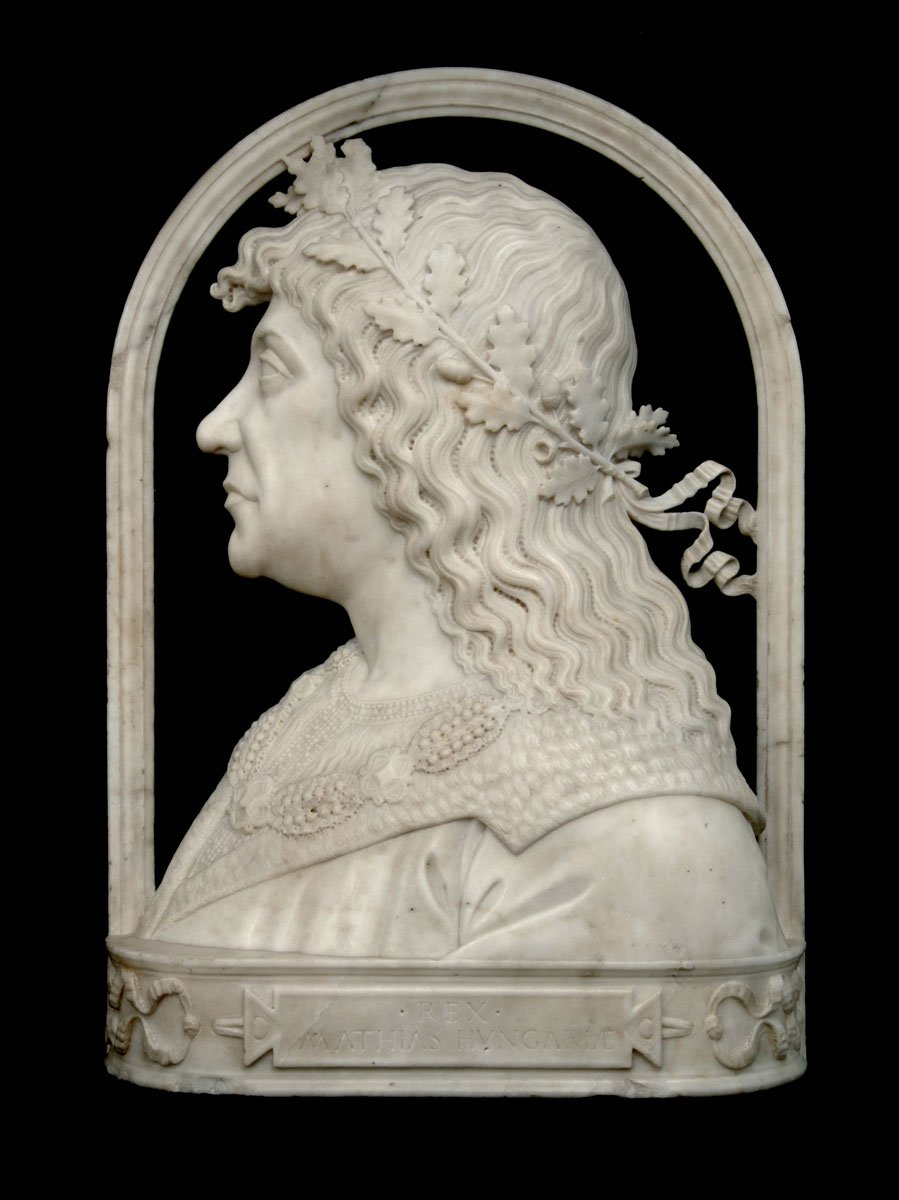
Renaissance portrait of Matthias Corvinus, King of Hungary and Croatia (1458–1490), King of Bohemia (1469–1490) and Archduke of Austria (1487–1490)

The last strong king of medieval Hungary was the Renaissance king Matthias Corvinus (1458–1490), son of John Hunyadi. His election was the first time that a member of the nobility mounted the Hungarian royal throne without a dynastic background. He was a successful military leader and an enlightened patron of the arts and learning. His library, the Bibliotheca Corviniana, was Europe's greatest collection of historical chronicles, philosophic and scientific works in the 15th century, and second only in size to the Vatican Library. Items from the Bibliotheca Corviniana were inscribed on UNESCO's Memory of the World Register in 2005. The serfs and common people considered him a just ruler because he protected them from excessive demands and other abuses by the magnates. Under his rule, in 1479, the Hungarian army destroyed the Ottoman and Wallachian troops at the Battle of Breadfield. Abroad, he defeated the Polish and German imperial armies of Frederick at Breslau (Wrocław). Matthias' mercenary standing army, the Black Army of Hungary, was an unusually large army for its time, and it conquered Vienna as well as parts of Austria and Bohemia.

King Matthias died without lawful sons, and the Hungarian magnates procured the accession of the Pole Vladislaus II (1490–1516), supposedly because of his weak influence on Hungarian aristocracy. Hungary's international role declined, its political stability was shaken, and social progress was deadlocked. In 1514, the weakened old King Vladislaus II faced a major peasant rebellion led by György Dózsa, which was ruthlessly crushed by the nobles, led by John Zápolya. The resulting degradation of order paved the way for Ottoman preeminence. In 1521, the strongest Hungarian fortress in the South, Nándorfehérvár (today's Belgrade, Serbia), fell to the Turks. The early appearance of Protestantism further worsened internal relations in the country.

=== Ottoman wars (1526–1699) ===
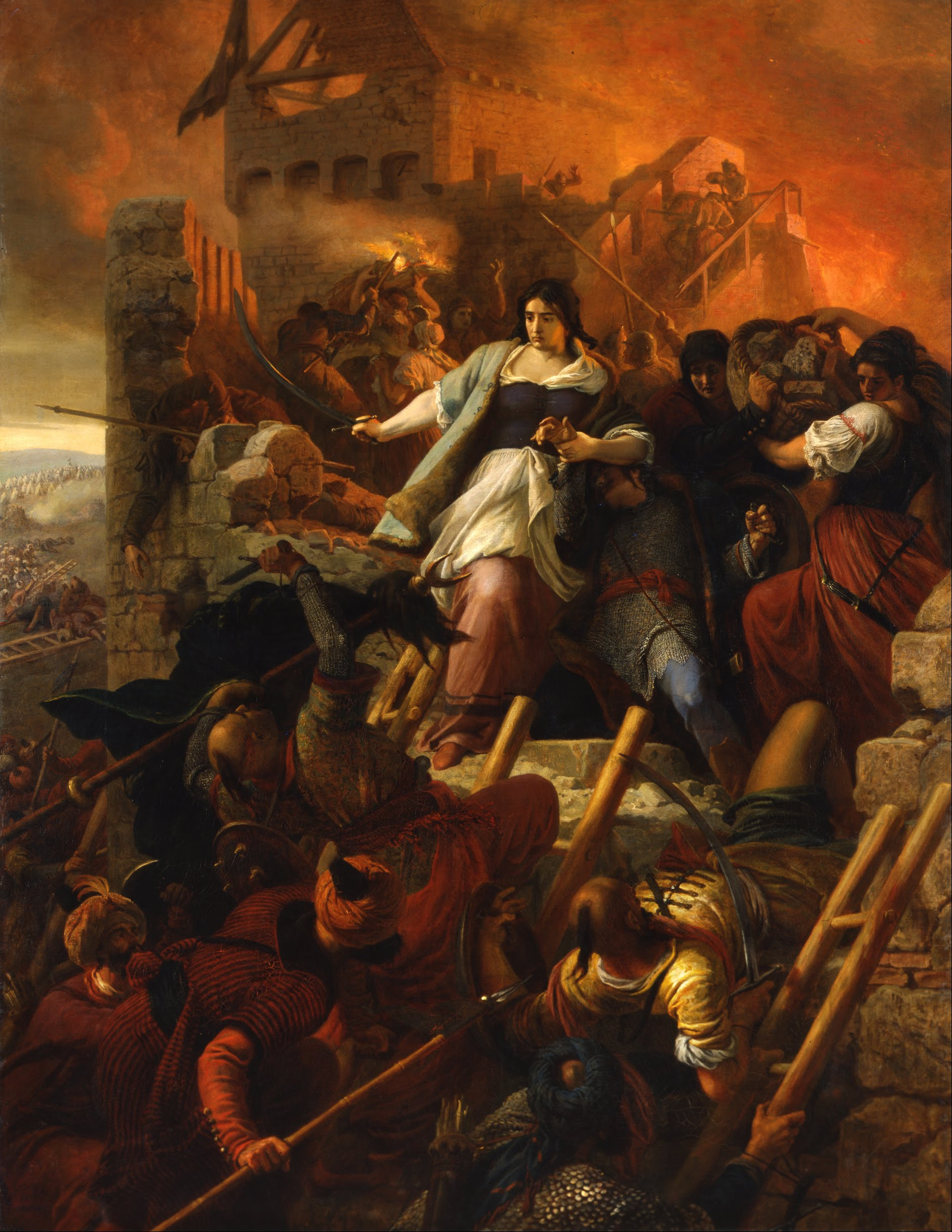
"The Women of Eger", oil painting from 1867 commemorating the siege of Eger, a major victory against the Ottomans

After some 150 years of wars with the Hungarians and other states, the Ottomans gained a decisive victory over the Hungarian army at the Battle of Mohács in 1526, where King Louis II died while fleeing. Amid political chaos, the divided Hungarian nobility elected two kings simultaneously, John Zápolya and Ferdinand I of the Habsburg dynasty. With the conquest of Buda by the Turks in 1541, Hungary was divided into three parts and remained so until the end of the 17th century. The north-western part, termed as Royal Hungary, was annexed by the Habsburgs, who ruled as kings of Hungary. The eastern part of the kingdom became independent as the Principality of Transylvania, under Ottoman (and later Habsburg) suzerainty. The remaining central area, including the capital Buda, was known as the Pashalik of Buda.

In 1686, the Holy League's army, containing over 74,000 men from various nations, reconquered Buda from the Turks. After more crushing defeats of the Ottomans in the next few years, the Kingdom of Hungary was removed from Ottoman rule by 1718. The last raid into Hungary by the Ottoman vassals Tatars from Crimea took place in 1717. The constrained Habsburg Counter-Reformation efforts in the 17th century reconverted the majority of the kingdom to Catholicism. The ethnic composition of Hungary was fundamentally changed as a consequence of the prolonged warfare with the Turks. A large part of the country became devastated, population growth was stunted, and many smaller settlements perished. The Austrian-Habsburg government settled large groups of Serbs and other Slavs in the depopulated south, and settled Germans (called Danube Swabians) in various areas, but Hungarians were not allowed to settle or re-settle in the south of the Carpathian Basin.

=== From the 18th century to World War I (1699–1918) ===
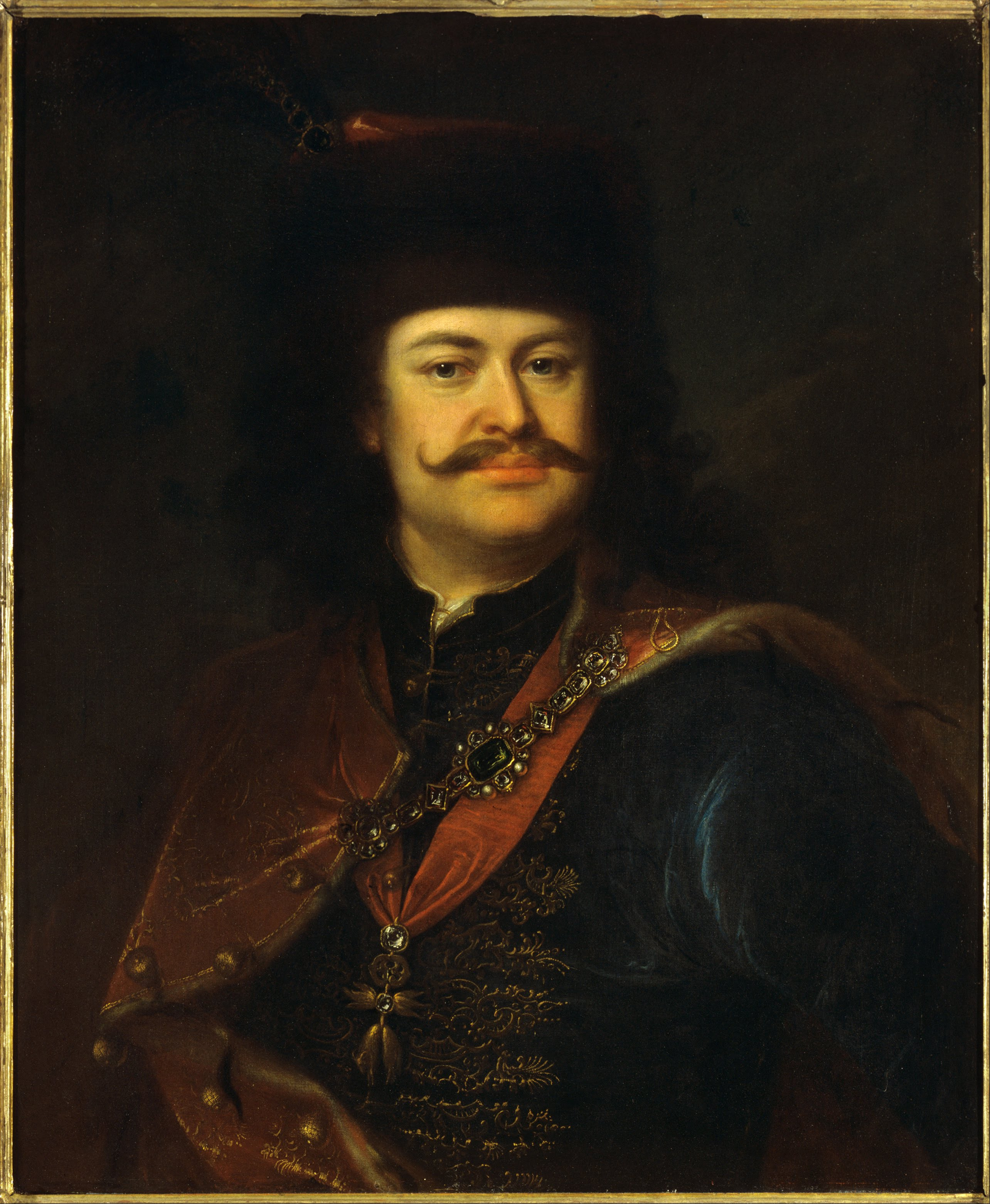
Francis II Rákóczi, leader of the war of independence against Habsburg rule (1703–1711)

Between 1703 and 1711, there was a large-scale war of independence led by Francis II Rákóczi, who after the dethronement of the Habsburgs in 1707 at the Diet of Ónod, took power provisionally as the ruling prince for the wartime period, but refused the Hungarian crown and the title "king". The uprisings lasted for years. The Hungarian Kuruc army, although taking over most of the country, lost the main battle at Trencsén (1708). Three years later, because of the growing desertion, defeatism, and low morale, the Kuruc forces surrendered.

During the Napoleonic Wars and afterward, the Hungarian Diet had not convened for decades. In the 1820s, the emperor was forced to convene the Diet, which marked the beginning of a Reform Period (1825–1848, Hungarian: reformkor). The Hungarian Parliament was reconvened in 1825 to handle financial needs. A liberal party emerged and focused on providing for the peasantry. Lajos Kossuth emerged as a leader of the lower gentry in the Parliament. A remarkable upswing started as the nation concentrated its forces on modernisation, even though the Habsburg monarchs obstructed all important liberal laws relating to civil and political rights and economic reforms. Many reformers (Lajos Kossuth, Mihály Táncsics) were imprisoned by the authorities.

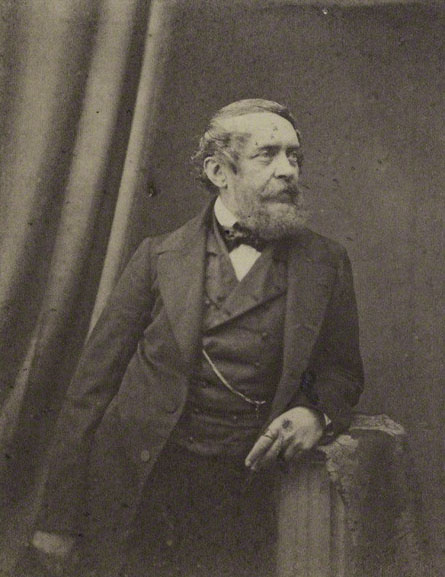
Lajos Kossuth, Regent-President during the Hungarian Revolution of 1848

On 15 March 1848, mass demonstrations in Pest and Buda enabled Hungarian reformists to push through a list of 12 demands. Under Governor and President Lajos Kossuth and Prime Minister Lajos Batthyány, the House of Habsburg was dethroned. The Habsburg ruler and his advisors skillfully manipulated the Croatian, Serbian and Romanian peasantry, led by priests and officers firmly loyal to the Habsburgs, into rebelling against the Hungarian government, though the Hungarians were supported by the vast majority of the Slovak, German and Rusyn nationalities and by all the Jews of the kingdom, as well as by a large number of Polish, Austrian and Italian volunteers. In July 1849, the Hungarian Parliament proclaimed and enacted the first laws of ethnic and minority rights in the world. Many members of minority nationalities, like János Damjanich and Józef Bem, gained the coveted highest positions within the Hungarian Army. The Hungarian forces (Honvédség) defeated the Austrian armies. To counter the successes of the Hungarian revolutionary army, Habsburg Emperor Franz Joseph I asked for help from the "Gendarme of Europe", Tsar Nicholas I, whose Russian armies invaded Hungary. This made Artúr Görgey surrender in August 1849. The leader of the Austrian army, Julius Jacob von Haynau, became governor of Hungary for a few months and ordered the execution of the 13 Martyrs of Arad, leaders of the Hungarian army, and Prime Minister Batthyány in October 1849. Kossuth escaped into exile. Following the war of 1848–1849, the whole country was in "passive resistance".

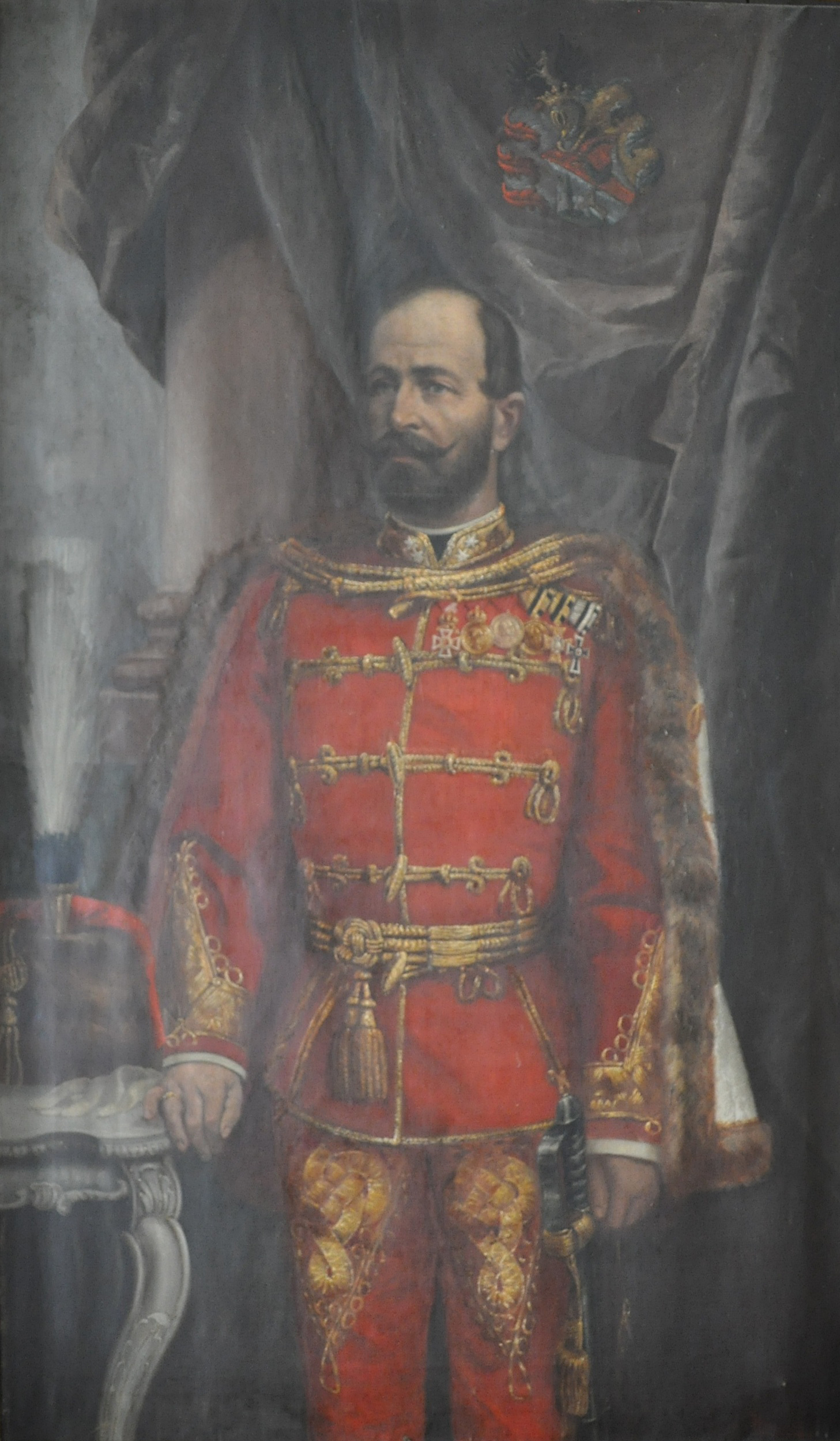
János Kubinyi, General in the Hungarian Honvéd army, Knight of the Order of Leopold.

Because of external and internal problems, reforms seemed inevitable, and major military defeats of Austria forced the Habsburgs to negotiate the Austro-Hungarian Compromise of 1867, by which the dual monarchy of Austria-Hungary was formed. This empire had the second largest area in Europe (after the Russian Empire), and it was the third most populous (after Russia and the German Empire). The two realms were governed separately by two parliaments from two capital cities, with a common monarch and common external and military policies. Economically, the empire was a customs union. The old Hungarian Constitution was restored, and Franz Joseph I was crowned as King of Hungary. The era witnessed impressive economic development. The formerly backward Hungarian economy became relatively modern and industrialised by the turn of the 20th century, although agriculture remained dominant until 1890. In 1873, the old capital Buda and Óbuda were officially united with Pest, creating the new metropolis of Budapest. Many of the state institutions and the modern administrative system of Hungary were established during this period.

The Lands of the Crown of Saint Stephen consisted of the territories of the Kingdom of Hungary (16) and the Kingdom of Croatia-Slavonia (17).

After the assassination of Archduke Franz Ferdinand in Sarajevo, Prime Minister István Tisza and his cabinet tried to avoid the outbreak and escalation of a war in Europe, but their diplomatic efforts were unsuccessful. Austria-Hungary drafted over 4 million soldiers from the Kingdom of Hungary on the side of Germany, Bulgaria, and Turkey. The troops raised in the Kingdom of Hungary spent little time defending the actual territory of Hungary, with the exceptions of the Brusilov offensive in June 1916 and a few months later when the Romanian army made an attack into Transylvania, both of which were repelled. The Central Powers conquered Serbia, southern Romania, and the Romanian capital Bucharest. In 1916, Franz Joseph died, and the new monarch Charles IV sympathised with the pacifists. With great difficulty, the Central Powers stopped and repelled the attacks of the Russian Empire.

The Eastern Front of the Allied (Entente) Powers completely collapsed. The Austro-Hungarian Empire then withdrew from all defeated countries. Despite great success on the Eastern Front, Germany suffered complete defeat on the Western Front. By 1918, the economic situation had deteriorated (strikes in factories were organised by leftist and pacifist movements) and uprisings in the army had become common. In the capital cities, the Austrian and Hungarian leftist liberal movements and their leaders supported the separatism of ethnic minorities. Austria-Hungary signed a general armistice in Padua on 3 November 1918. In October 1918, Hungary's union with Austria was dissolved.

=== Between the World Wars (1918–1941) ===
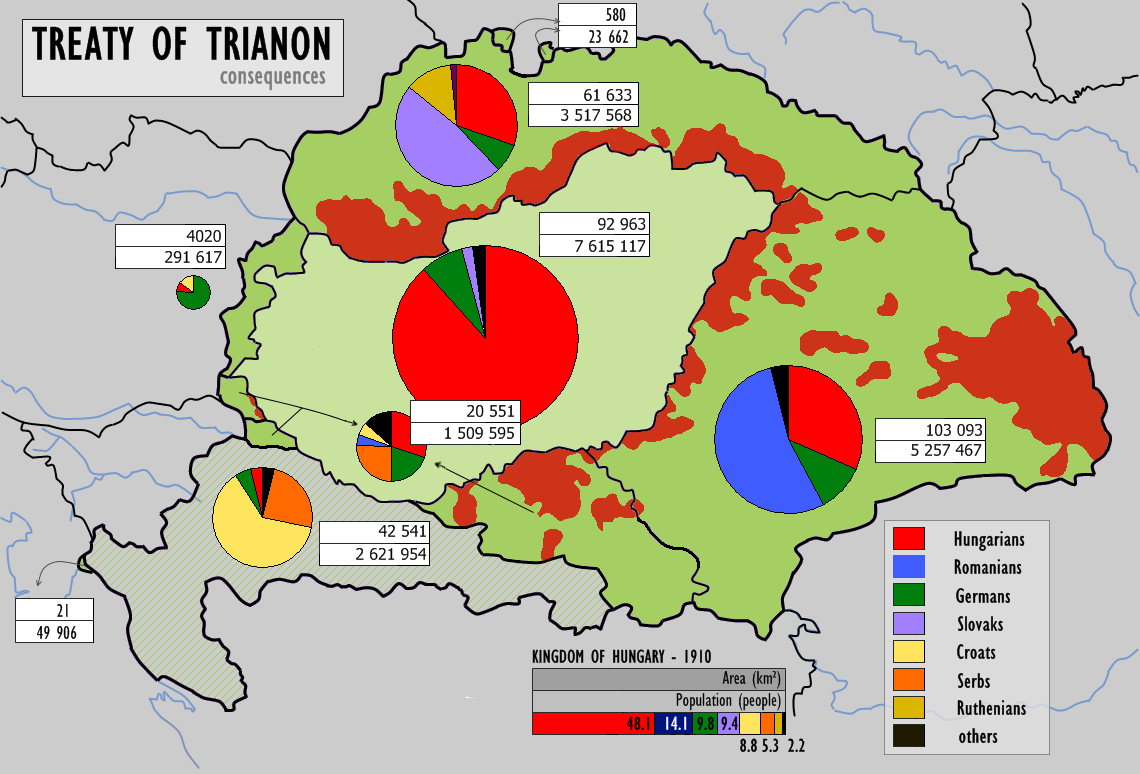
With the 1920 Treaty of Trianon, Hungary lost 72% of its territory, its sea ports, and 3,425,000 ethnic Hungarians. Majority Hungarian areas (according to the 1910 census) detached from Hungary

Following the First World War, Hungary underwent a period of profound political upheaval, beginning with the Aster Revolution in 1918, which brought the social-democratic Mihály Károlyi to power as prime minister. The Hungarian Royal Honvéd army still had more than 1,400,000 soldiers when Károlyi was installed. Károlyi yielded to U.S. President Woodrow Wilson's demand for pacifism by ordering the disarmament of the Hungarian army. Disarmament meant that Hungary was to remain without a national defence at a time of particular vulnerability. During the rule of Károlyi's pacifist cabinet, Hungary lost control over approximately 75% of its pre-war territories (325,411 square kilometres (125,642 sq mi)) without a fight and was subject to foreign occupation. The Little Entente, sensing an opportunity, invaded the country from three sides—Romania invaded Transylvania, Czechoslovakia annexed Upper Hungary (today's Slovakia), and a joint Serb-French coalition annexed Vojvodina and other southern regions. In March 1919, communists led by Béla Kun ousted the Károlyi government and proclaimed the Hungarian Soviet Republic (Tanácsköztársaság), followed by a thorough Red Terror campaign. Despite some successes on the Czechoslovak front, Kun's forces were ultimately unable to resist the Romanian invasion; by August 1919, Romanian troops occupied Budapest and ousted Kun.

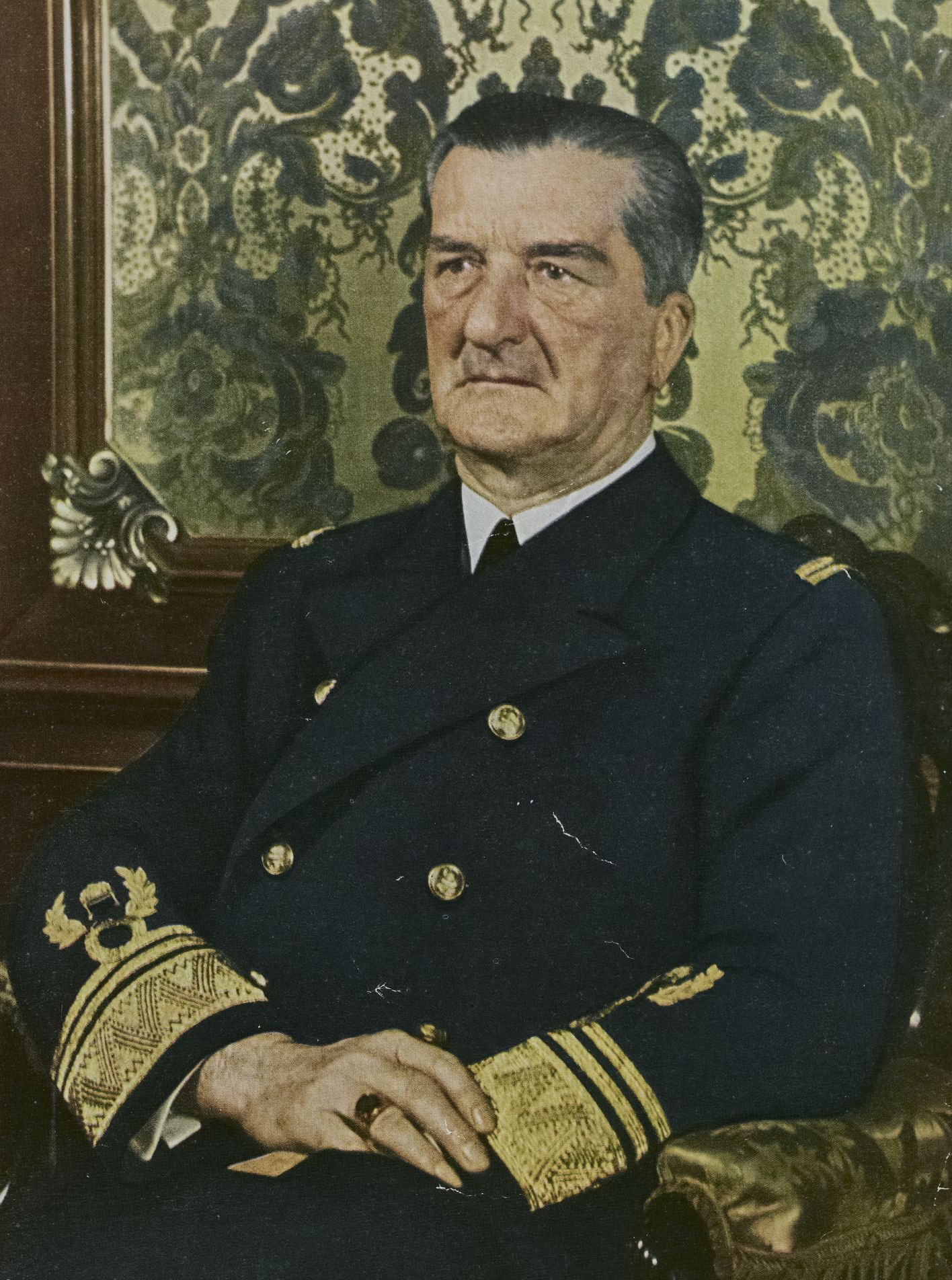
Miklós Horthy, Regent of the Kingdom of Hungary (1920–1944)

In November 1919, rightist forces led by former Austro-Hungarian admiral Miklós Horthy entered Budapest; exhausted by the war and its aftermath, the populace accepted Horthy's leadership. In January 1920, parliamentary elections were held, and Horthy was proclaimed regent of the reestablished Kingdom of Hungary, inaugurating the so-called "Horthy era" (Horthy-kor). The new government worked quickly to normalise foreign relations while turning a blind eye to a White Terror that swept through the countryside; extrajudicial killings of suspected communists and Jews lasted well into 1920.

On 4 June 1920, the Treaty of Trianon established new borders for Hungary. The country lost 71% of its territory and 66% of its pre-war population, as well as many sources of raw materials and its sole port at Fiume. An estimated 3.3 million ethnic Hungarians were living in the ceded territories, mostly in what is now Romania, Slovakia and Serbia, although modern sources for this figure range from 2 million to 5 million. Though the revision of the treaty quickly rose to the top of the national political agenda, the Horthy government was not willing to resort to military intervention to do so.

The initial years of the Horthy regime were preoccupied with putsch attempts by Charles IV, the Austro-Hungarian pretender; continued suppression of communists; and a migration crisis triggered by the Trianon territorial changes. The government's actions continued to drift right with the passage of antisemitic laws and, because of the continued isolation of the Little Entente, economic and then political gravitation towards Italy and Germany. The Great Depression further exacerbated the situation, and the popularity of fascist politicians increased, such as Gyula Gömbös and Ferenc Szálasi, promising economic and social recovery. Horthy's nationalist agenda reached its apogee in 1938 and 1940, when the Nazis rewarded Hungary's staunchly pro-Germany foreign policy in the First and Second Vienna Awards, peacefully restoring ethnic-Hungarian-majority areas lost after Trianon. In 1939, Hungary regained further territory from Czechoslovakia through force. Hungary formally joined the Axis powers on 20 November 1940 and in 1941 participated in the invasion of Yugoslavia, gaining some of its former territories in the south.

=== World War II (1941–1945) ===
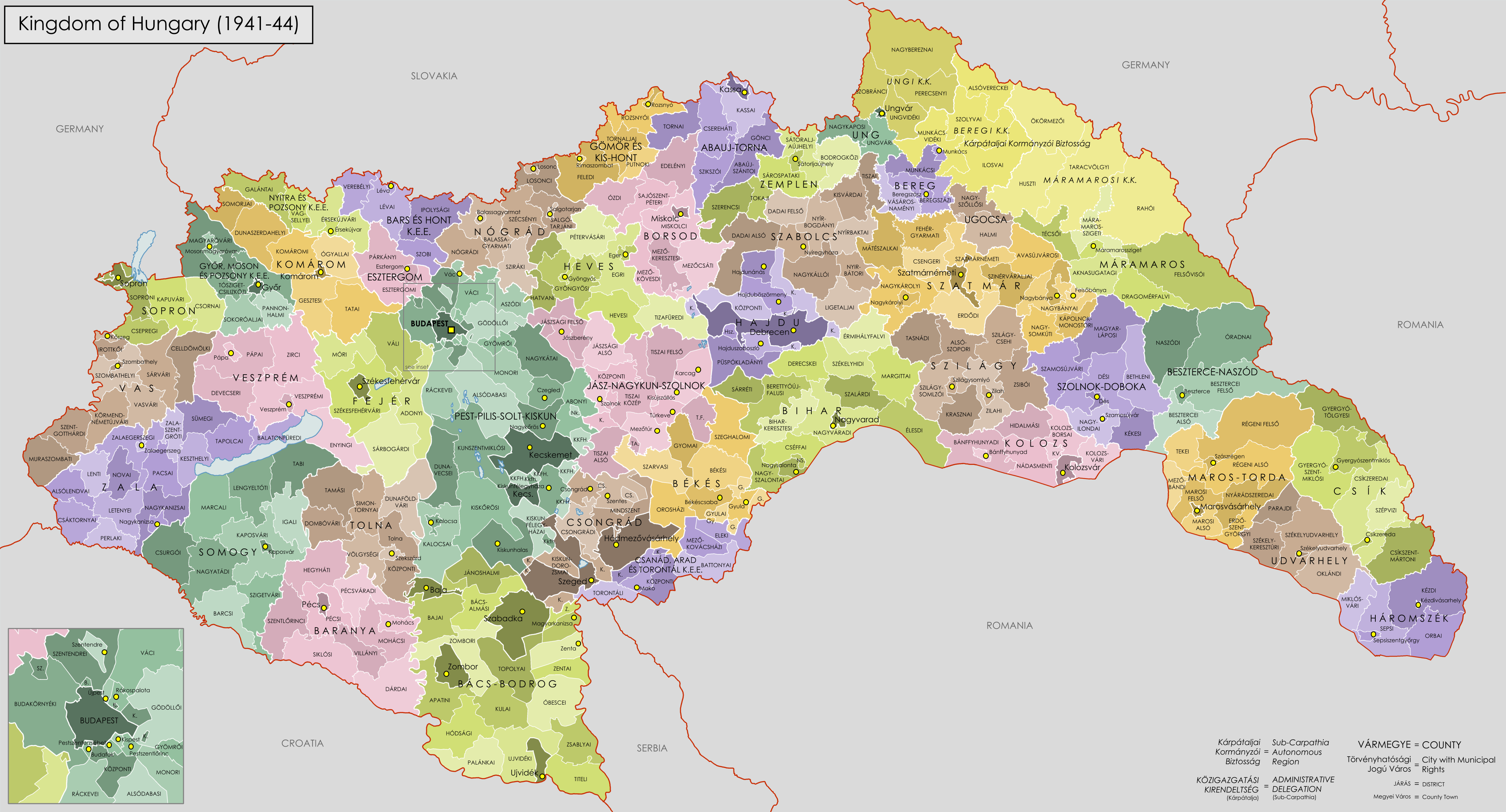
Kingdom of Hungary, 1941–1944

Hungary formally entered World War II as an Axis power on 26 June 1941, declaring war on the Soviet Union after unidentified planes bombed Kassa, Munkács, and Rahó. Hungarian troops fought on the Eastern Front for two years. Despite early success at the Battle of Uman, the government began seeking a secret peace pact with the Allies after the Second Army suffered catastrophic losses at the River Don in January 1943. Learning of the planned defection, German troops occupied Hungary on 19 March 1944 to guarantee Horthy's compliance.

In October, as the Soviet front approached, and the government made further efforts to disengage from the war, German troops ousted Horthy and installed a puppet government under Szálasi's fascist Arrow Cross Party. Szálasi pledged all the country's capabilities in service of the German war machine. By October 1944, the Soviets had reached the river Tisza, and despite some losses, succeeded in encircling and besieging Budapest in December.

On 13 February 1945, Budapest surrendered; by April, German troops left the country under Soviet military occupation. 200,000 Hungarians were expelled from Czechoslovakia in exchange for 70,000 Slovaks living in Hungary. 202,000 ethnic Germans were expelled to Germany, and through the 1947 Paris Peace Treaties, Hungary was again reduced to its immediate post-Trianon borders.

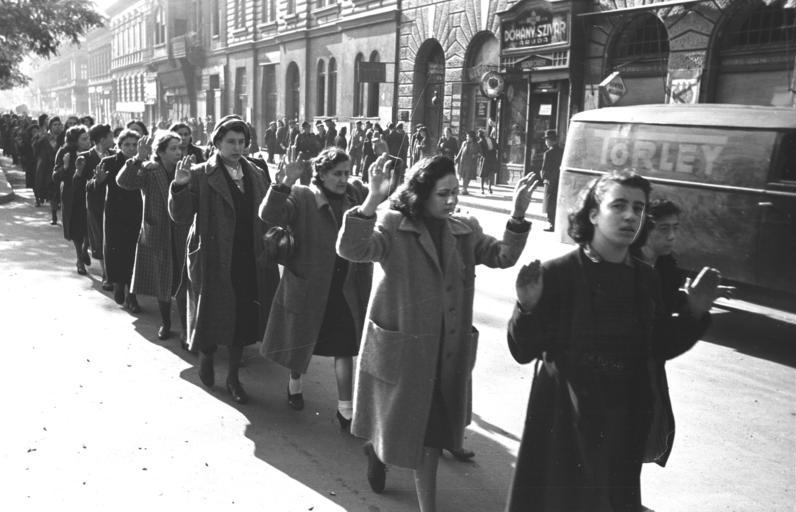
Jewish women being arrested on Wesselényi Street in Budapest during the Holocaust, c. 20–22 October 1944

The war left Hungary devastated, destroying over 60% of the economy and causing significant loss of life. In addition to the over 600,000 Hungarian Jews killed, as many as 280,000 other Hungarians were raped, murdered and executed or deported for slave labour. After German occupation, Hungary participated in the Holocaust, deporting nearly 440,000 Jews, mainly to Auschwitz; nearly all of them were murdered. The Horthy government's complicity in the Holocaust remains a point of controversy and contention.

=== Communism (1945–1989) ===
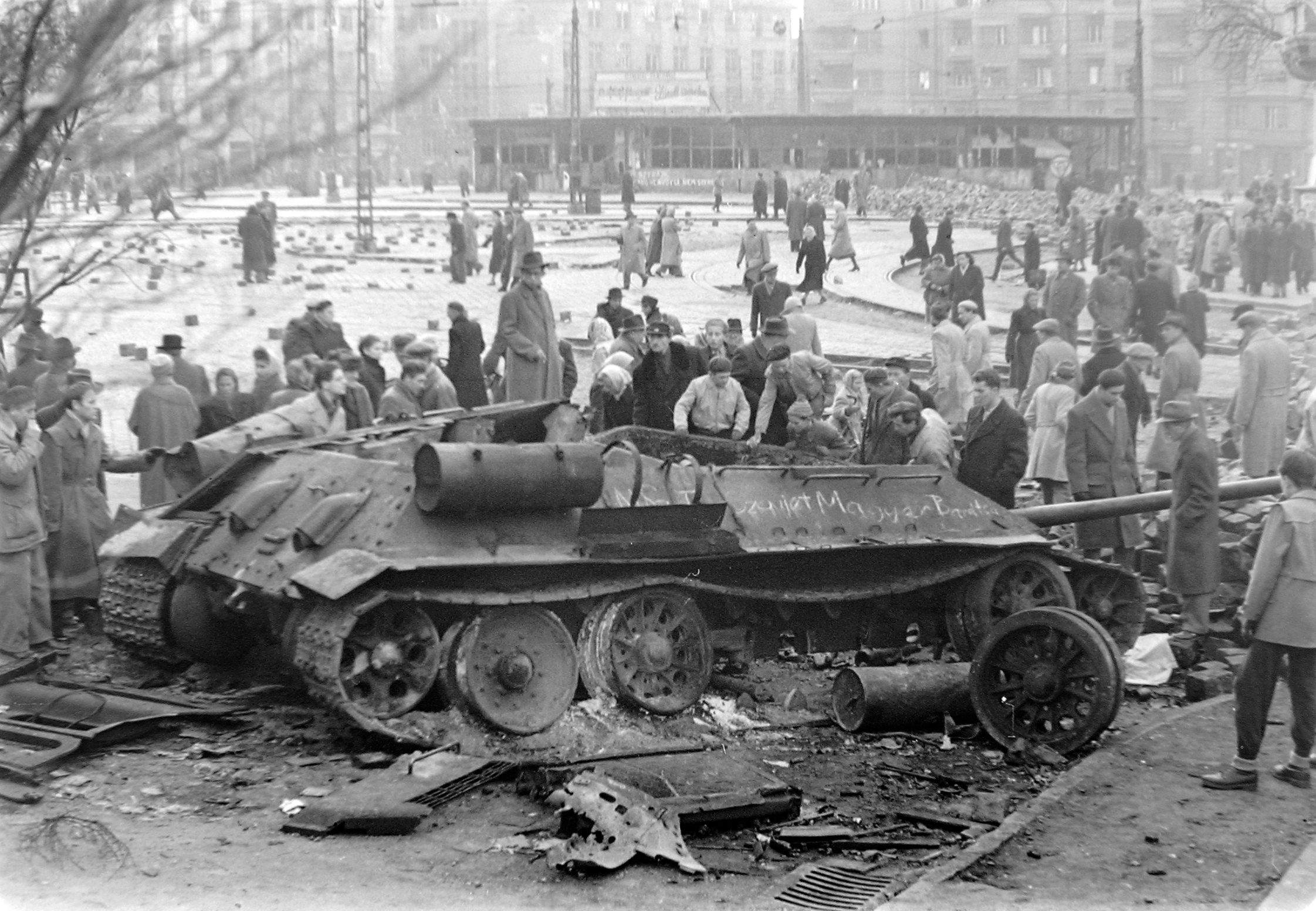
A destroyed Soviet tank in Budapest during the Revolution of 1956. Time's Man of the Year for 1956 was the Hungarian freedom fighter.

Following the defeat of Nazi Germany, Hungary became a satellite state of the Soviet Union. The Soviet leadership selected Mátyás Rákosi to front the Stalinisation of the country, and Rákosi de facto ruled Hungary from 1949 to 1956. His government's policies of militarisation, industrialisation, collectivisation, and war compensation led to a severe decline in living standards. In imitation of Stalin's KGB, the Rákosi government established a secret political police, the ÁVH, to enforce the regime; approximately 350,000 officials and intellectuals were imprisoned or executed from 1948 to 1956. Many freethinkers, democrats, and Horthy-era dignitaries were secretly arrested and extrajudicially interned in domestic and foreign gulags. Some 600,000 Hungarians were deported to Soviet labour camps, where at least 200,000 died.

After Stalin's death in 1953, the Soviet Union pursued a programme of de-Stalinisation that was inimical to Rákosi, leading to his deposition. The following political cooling saw the ascent of Imre Nagy to the premiership. Nagy promised market liberalisation and political openness. Rákosi eventually managed to discredit Nagy and replace him with the more hard-line Ernő Gerő. Hungary joined the Warsaw Pact in May 1955, as societal dissatisfaction with the regime swelled. Following the firing on peaceful demonstrations by Soviet soldiers and secret police, and rallies throughout the country on 23 October 1956, protesters took to the streets in Budapest, initiating the 1956 Revolution.

In an effort to quell the chaos, Nagy returned as premier, promised free elections, and took Hungary out of the Warsaw Pact. The violence nonetheless continued as revolutionary militias sprung up against the Soviet Army and the ÁVH; the roughly 3,000-strong resistance fought Soviet tanks using Molotov cocktails and machine-pistols. Though the preponderance of the Soviets was immense, they suffered heavy losses, and by 30 October 1956, most Soviet troops had withdrawn from Budapest to garrison the countryside. For a time, the Soviet leadership was unsure how to respond but eventually decided to intervene to prevent a destabilisation of the Soviet bloc. On 4 November, reinforcements of more than 150,000 troops and 2,500 tanks entered the country from the Soviet Union. Nearly 20,000 Hungarians were killed resisting the intervention, while an additional 21,600 were imprisoned afterward for political reasons. Some 13,000 were interned and 230 brought to trial and executed. Nagy was secretly tried, found guilty, sentenced to death, and executed by hanging in June 1958. Because borders were briefly opened, nearly a quarter of a million people fled the country by the time the revolution was suppressed.

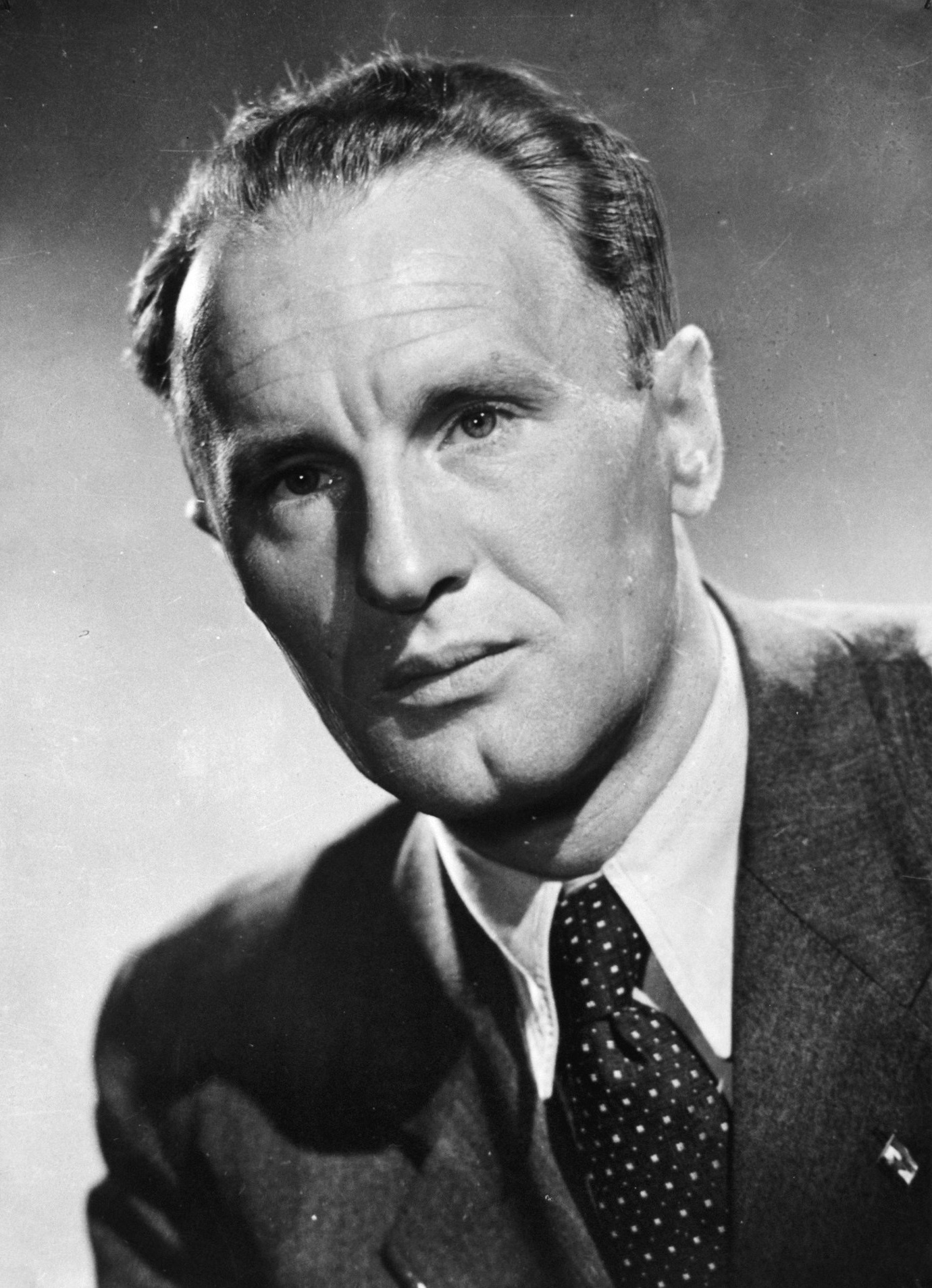
János Kádár, General Secretary of the Hungarian Socialist Workers' Party (1956–1988)

After a second, briefer period of Soviet military occupation, János Kádár, Nagy's former minister of state, was chosen by the Soviet leadership to head the new government and chair the new ruling Socialist Workers' Party. Kádár quickly normalised the situation. In 1963, the government granted a general amnesty. Kádár proclaimed a new policy line, according to which the people were no longer compelled to profess loyalty to the party if they tacitly accepted the socialist regime as a fact of life. Kádár introduced new planning priorities in the economy, such as allowing farmers significant plots of private land within the collective farm system (háztáji gazdálkodás). The living standard rose as consumer goods and food production took precedence over military production, which was reduced to one-tenth of prerevolutionary levels.

In 1968, the New Economic Mechanism introduced free-market elements into the socialist command economy. From the 1960s through the late 1980s, Hungary was often referred to as "the happiest barrack" within the Eastern bloc. During the latter part of the Cold War Hungary's GDP per capita was fourth only to East Germany, Czechoslovakia, and the Soviet Union. As a result of this relatively high standard of living, a more liberalised economy, a less censored press, and less restricted travel rights, Hungary was generally considered one of the more liberal countries in which to live in Central Europe during communism. In 1980, Hungary sent the first Hungarian Cosmonaut, Bertalan Farkas, into space as part of the Interkosmos. Hungary became the seventh nation to be represented in space. In the 1980s, however, living standards steeply declined again because of a worldwide recession to which communism was unable to respond. By the time Kádár died in 1989, the Soviet Union was in steep decline and a younger generation of reformists saw liberalisation as the solution to economic and social issues.

=== Third Republic (1989–present) ===
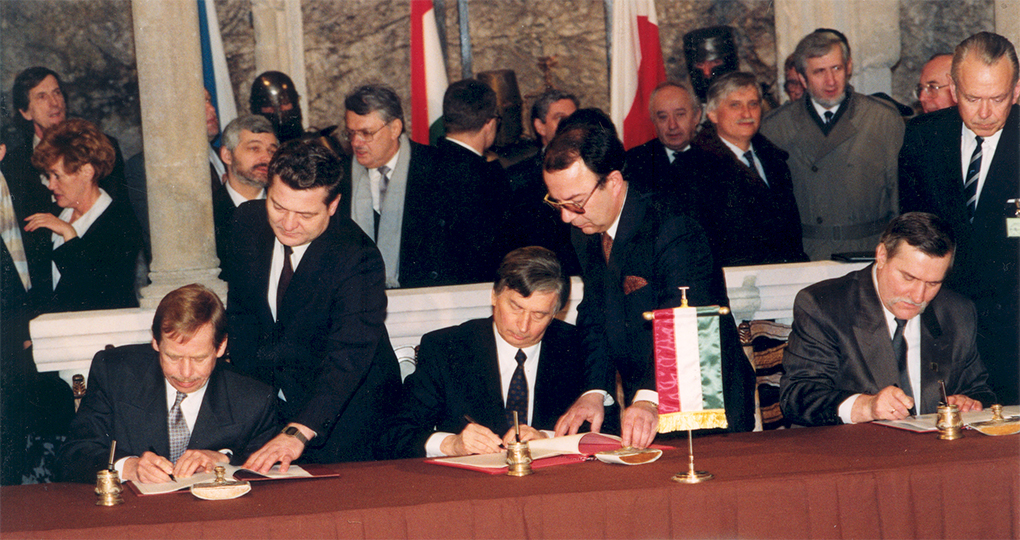
The Visegrád Group signing ceremony, 15 February 1991

Hungary's transition from communism to capitalism (Hungarian: rendszerváltás, "system change") was peaceful and prompted by economic stagnation, domestic political pressure, and changing relations with other Warsaw Pact countries. Although the Hungarian Socialist Workers' Party began Round Table Talks with various opposition groups in March 1989, the reburial of Imre Nagy as a revolutionary martyr that June is widely considered the symbolic end of communism in Hungary. Free elections were held in May 1990, and the Hungarian Democratic Forum, a major conservative opposition group, was elected to the head of a coalition government. József Antall became the first democratically elected prime minister since World War II.

With the removal of state subsidies and rapid privatisation in 1991, along with the Yugoslav Wars on its southern border, Hungary experienced a severe economic recession, as well as social and security instability as a consequence of the war. The Antall government's austerity measures proved unpopular, and the Communist Party's legal and political heir, the Socialist Party, won the subsequent 1994 elections. This abrupt shift in the political landscape was repeated in 1998 and 2002; in each electoral cycle, the governing party was ousted and the erstwhile opposition elected. Like most other post-communist European states, however, Hungary broadly pursued an integrationist agenda, joining NATO in 1999 and the European Union on 1 May 2004. As a NATO member, Hungary was involved in the Yugoslav Wars.

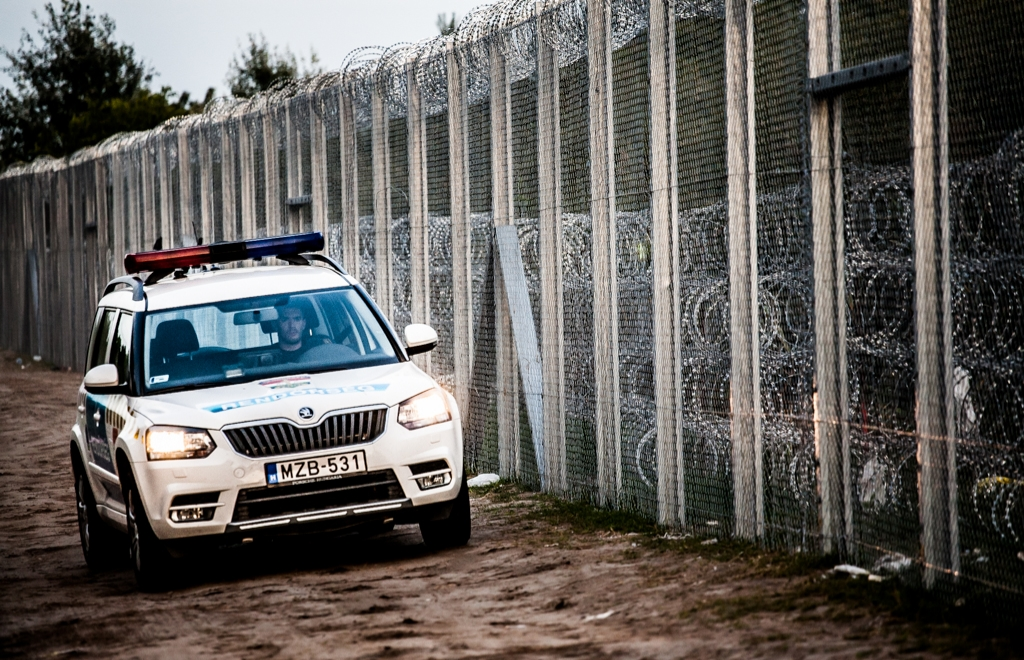
Police car at Hungary-Serbia border barrier

In 2006, major nationwide protests erupted after it was revealed that Prime Minister Ferenc Gyurcsány had claimed in a closed-door speech that his party "lied" to win the recent elections. The popularity of left-wing parties plummeted in the ensuing political upheaval, and in 2010, Viktor Orbán's national-conservative Fidesz party was elected to a parliamentary supermajority. The legislature consequently approved a new constitution, among other sweeping governmental and legal changes. Fidesz subsequently won supermajorities in the 2014, 2018, and 2022 elections.

After Orbán's election in 2010, Hungary experienced democratic backsliding. Under his leadership, described as the "Orbán era" (Hungarian: Orbán-korszak), the country was variously characterized as an illiberal democracy, hybrid regime, kleptocracy, dominant-party system, or mafia state. Orbán publicly embraced illiberalism, identifying Hungary as an "illiberal Christian democracy". As a result of these developments, Hungary's relationship with the United States and the European Union entered a period of protracted strain. Various EU bodies and member states moved to penalize Hungary or curtail its EU voting rights. Areas of conflict included LGBT rights, migration, the lex CEU, Hungary's decision to authorise Russian and Chinese vaccines during the COVID-19 pandemic, and international sanctions against Russia due to the 2022 Russian invasion of Ukraine. The Orbán government simultaneously came under increased international scrutiny over rule of law concerns. Orbán's government disputed these allegations.

In the 2026 election, Péter Magyar led the Tisza Party to a decisive supermajority victory, marking the first time in sixteen years that Fidesz moved into opposition. On 9 May 2026, Magyar was sworn in as Hungary's prime minister.

== Geography ==
Geographic map of Hungary

Hungary is a landlocked country. Its geography has traditionally been defined by its two main waterways, the Danube and Tisza rivers. The common tripartite division—Dunántúl ("beyond the Danube", Transdanubia), Tiszántúl ("beyond the Tisza"), and Duna–Tisza köze ("between the Danube and Tisza")—is a reflection of this. The Danube flows north–south through the centre of contemporary Hungary, and the entire country lies within its drainage basin.

Transdanubia, which stretches westward from the centre of the country towards Austria, is a primarily hilly region with a terrain varied by low mountains. These include the very eastern stretch of the Alps, Alpokalja, in the west of the country, the Transdanubian Mountains in the central region of Transdanubia, and the Mecsek Mountains and Villány Mountains in the south. The highest point of the area is the Írott-kő in the Alps, at 882 metres (2,894 ft). The Little Hungarian Plain (Kisalföld) is found in northern Transdanubia. Lake Balaton and Lake Hévíz, the largest lake in Central Europe and the largest thermal lake in the world, respectively, are in Transdanubia as well.

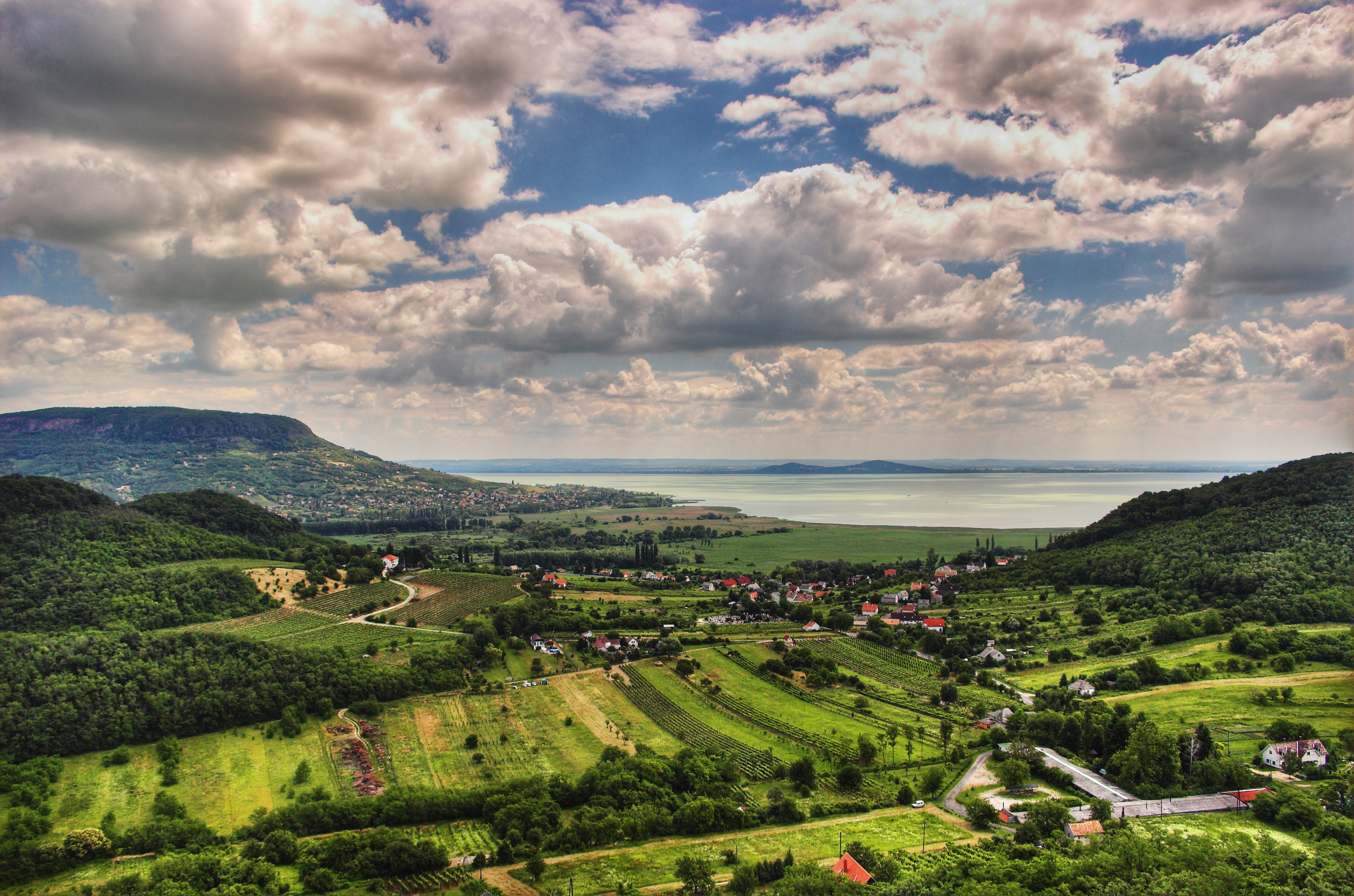
Lake Balaton

The Duna–Tisza köze and Tiszántúl are characterised mainly by the Great Hungarian Plain (Alföld), which stretches across most of the eastern and southeastern areas of the country. To the north of the plain are the foothills of the Carpathians in a wide band near the Slovak border. The Kékes at 1,014 m (3,327 ft) is the tallest mountain in Hungary and is found there.

Phytogeographically, Hungary belongs to the Central European province of the Circumboreal Region within the Boreal Kingdom. According to the WWF, the territory of Hungary belongs to the terrestrial ecoregion of Pannonian mixed forests.

=== Climate ===
Hungary has a temperate seasonal climate, with generally warm summers with low overall humidity levels but frequent rain showers and cold snowy winters. Average annual temperature is 9.7 °C (49.5 °F). Temperature extremes are 41.9 °C (107.4 °F) on 20 July 2007 at Kiskunhalas in the summer and −35 °C (−31.0 °F) on 16 February 1940 at Miskolc in the winter. Average high temperature in the summer is 23 to 28 °C (73 to 82 °F) and average low temperature in the winter is −3 to −7 °C (27 to 19 °F). The average yearly rainfall is approximately 600 mm (23.6 in).

== Government and politics ==
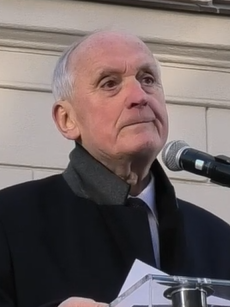
András Baka
President

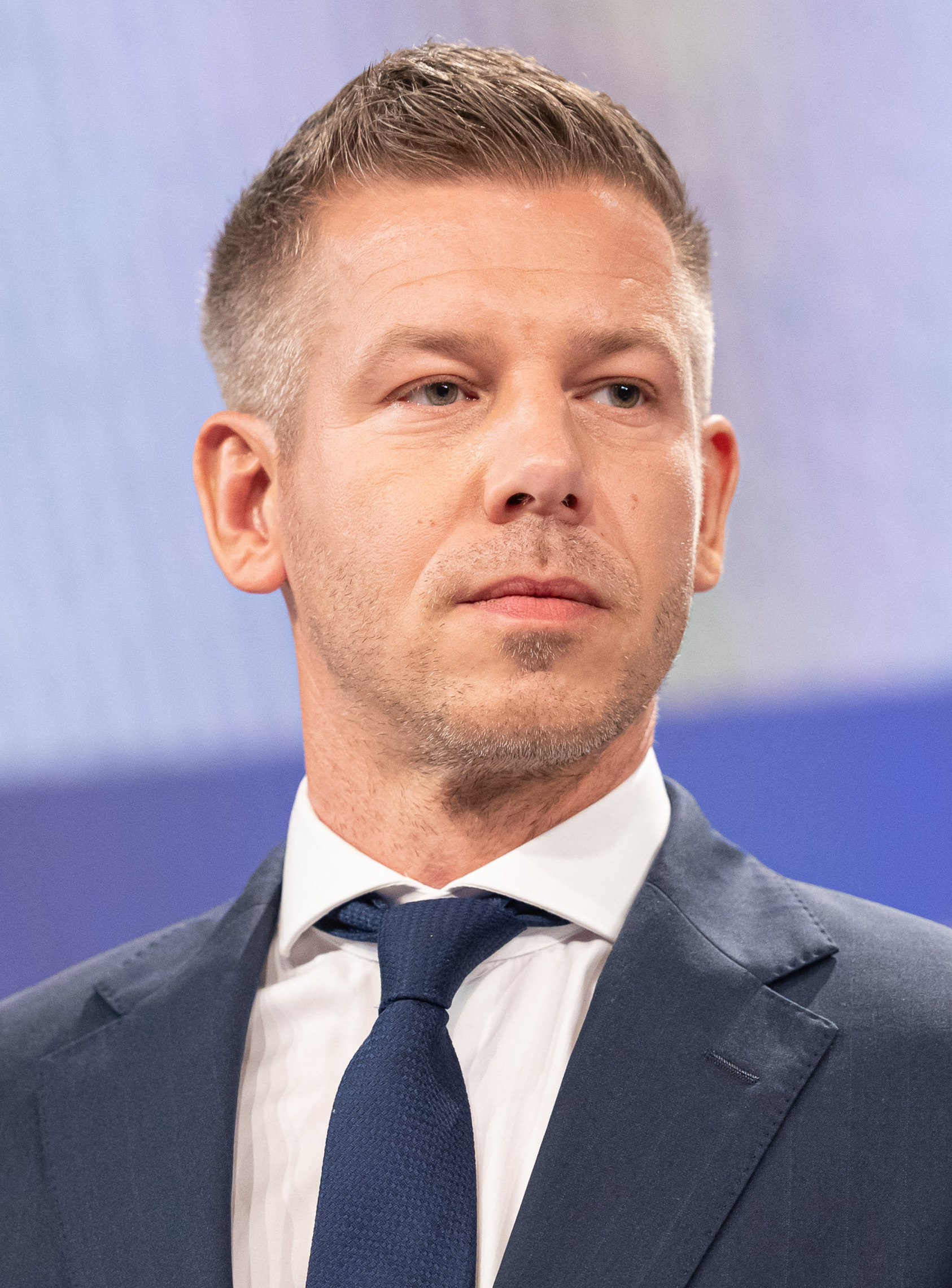
Péter Magyar
Prime Minister

Hungary is a unitary parliamentary republic. Its politics operates under a constitutional framework, the Fundamental Law (Hungarian: alaptörvény), most recently heavily reformed in 2012. A parliamentary supermajority of two-thirds is typically needed to amend this Law, although it contains certain unamendable eternity clauses (the articles guaranteeing human dignity, the separation of powers, the state structure, and the rule of law) as well.

199 Members of Parliament (országgyűlési képviselők, singular képviselő) are elected to the highest organ of state authority, the unicameral Országgyűlés (National Assembly), every four years by mixed-member majoritarian representation. 106 are elected in single-member constituencies by first-past-the-post voting, the other 93 from a single nationwide constituency by modified proportional representation. The electoral threshold is set at 5% for single-party lists, 10% for coalitions of two parties, and 15% for coalitions of three or more parties.

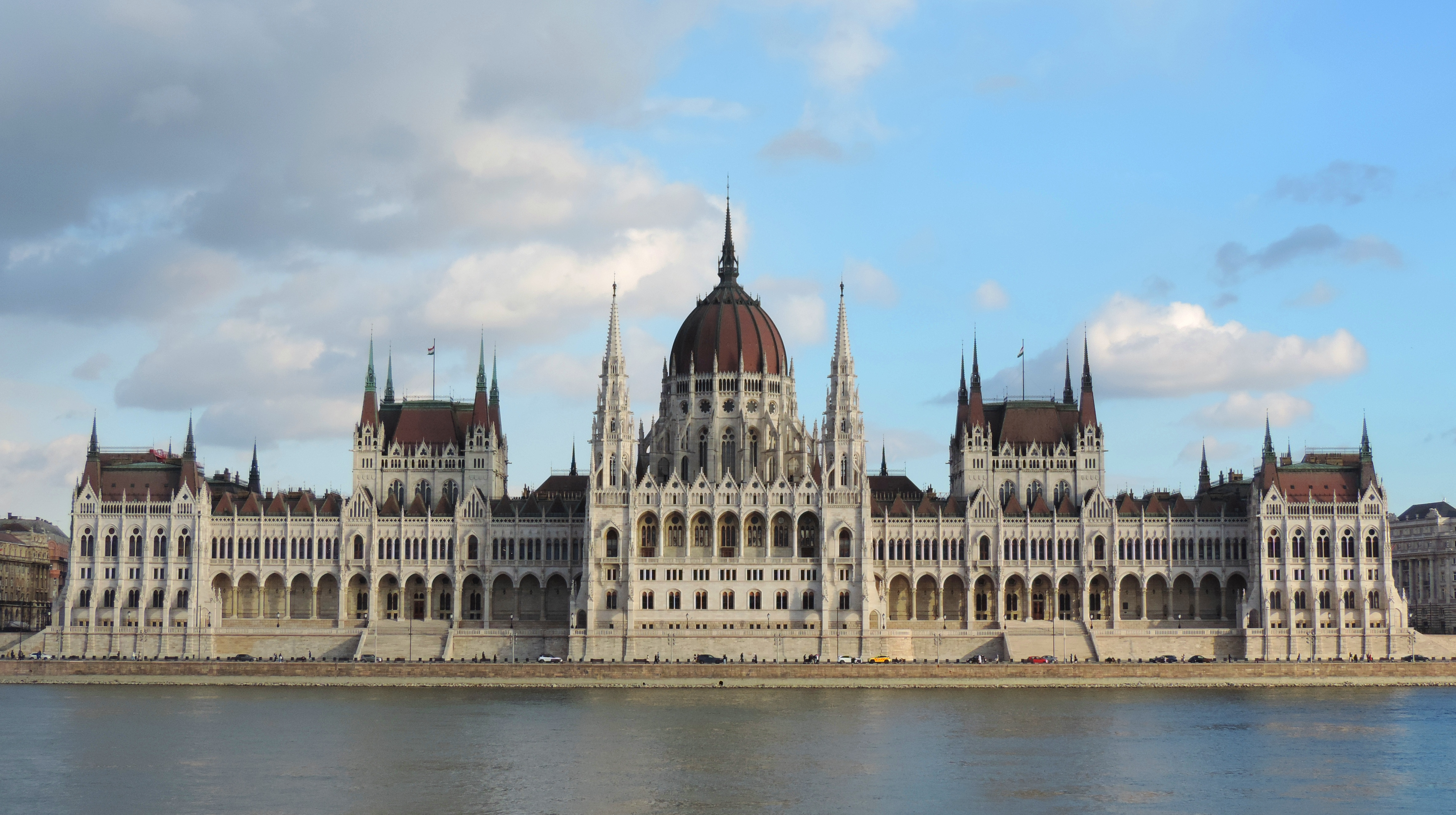
The Hungarian Parliament Building on the banks of the Danube in Budapest

The President of the Republic (köztársasági elnök) is the head of state and is elected by the National Assembly every five years. The president is invested primarily with representative responsibilities and powers: receiving foreign heads of state, nominating the prime minister at the recommendation of the National Assembly, and serving as commander-in-chief of the armed forces. However, the presidency is not entirely ceremonial; the president may veto legislation and send it to the 15-member Constitutional Court for review. The third most significant political office in Hungary is the Speaker of the National Assembly (házelnök), who is elected by the National Assembly and presides over the body's sessions.

The prime minister (miniszterelnök) is elected by the National Assembly, serves as the head of government, and exercises executive power. By convention, the prime minister is the leader of the largest party in the Assembly. The prime minister selects Cabinet ministers and has the exclusive right to dismiss them, although cabinet nominees must appear before consultative open hearings before one or more parliamentary committees, survive a vote in the National Assembly, and be formally approved by the president. They do not need to be MPs. Cabinet reports to Parliament.

=== Political parties ===
Since the fall of communism, Hungary has had a multiparty system. The most recent Hungarian parliamentary election was held on 12 April 2026, in which the Tisza Party, led by Péter Magyar, defeated the incumbent Fidesz–KDNP government of Prime Minister Viktor Orbán. As of 2026, the political landscape in Hungary mainly consists of the center-right Tisza, the national-conservative Fidesz, and the ultranationalist Mi Hazánk on the national level. Left-of-center parties play a more important role in the municipal politics of larger cities, most prominently in Budapest and Szeged.

Since 2014, voters of ethnic minorities in Hungary are able to vote on nationality lists. The minorities can obtain a preferential mandate if they reach the quarter of the ninety-third part of the list votes. Nationalities who did not get a mandate could send a nationality spokesman to the National Assembly.

=== Law and judicial system ===
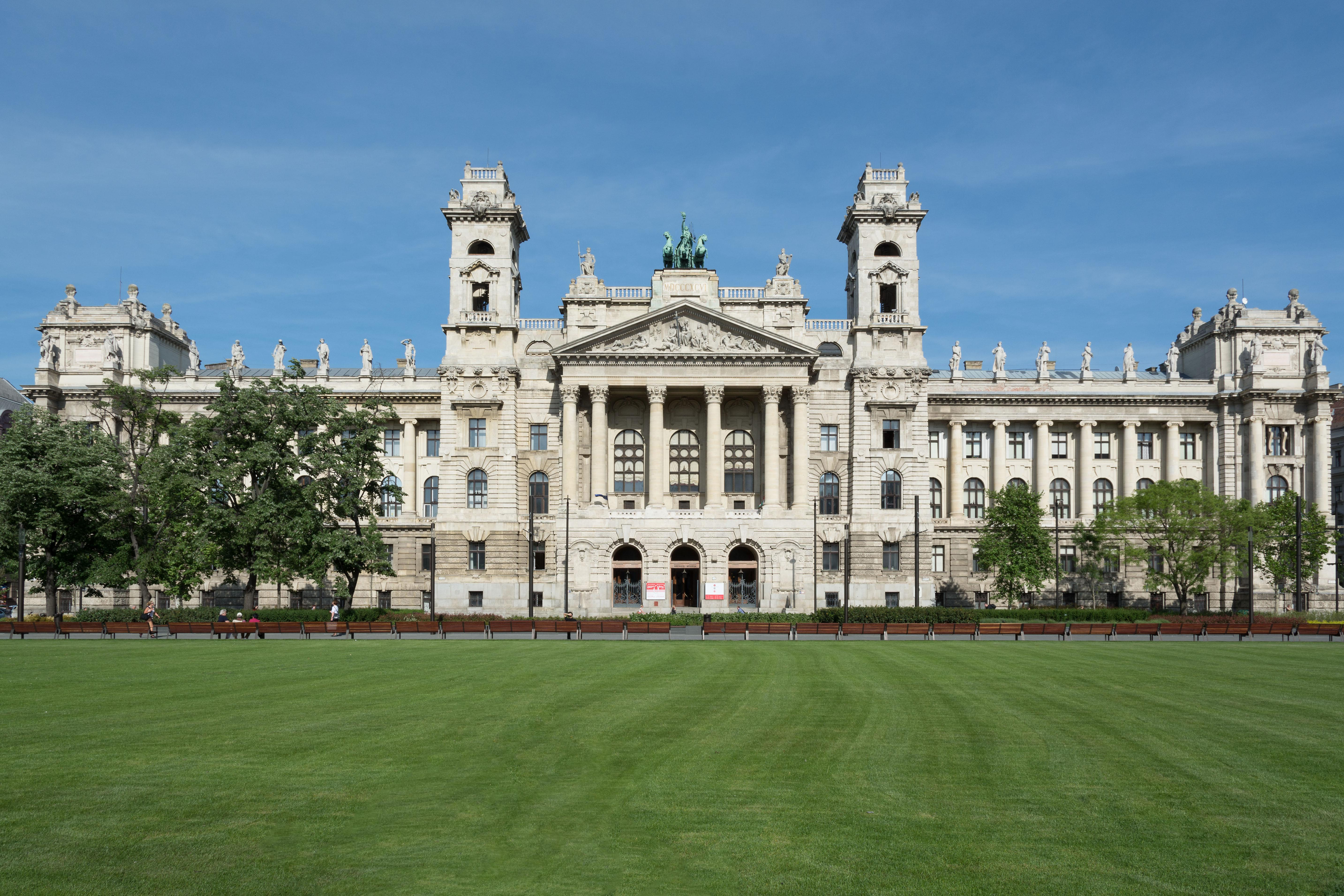
The original and future seat of the Curia, the Supreme court of Hungary

The judicial system of Hungary is a civil law system, divided between courts with regular civil and criminal jurisdiction, and administrative courts with jurisdiction over litigation between individuals and the public administration. Hungarian law is codified and based on German law and, in a wider sense, civil law or Roman law. The court system for civil and criminal jurisdiction consists of local courts (járásbíróság), regional appellate courts (ítélőtábla), and the supreme court (Kúria). Hungary's highest courts are located in Budapest.

Law enforcement in Hungary is split among the police and the National Tax and Customs Administration. The Hungarian Police is the main and largest state law enforcement agency in Hungary. It carries nearly all general police duties such as criminal investigation, patrol activity, traffic policing, border control. It is led by the national police commissioner under the control of the Minister of the Interior. The body is divided into county police departments which are also divided into regional and town police departments. The National Police has subordinate agencies with nationwide jurisdiction, such as the "Nemzeti Nyomozó Iroda" (National Bureau of Investigation), a civilian police force specialised in investigating serious crimes, and the gendarmerie-like, militarised "Készenléti rendőrség" (Stand-by Police) mainly dealing with riots and often reinforcing local police forces. Because of Hungary's accession to the Schengen Treaty, the police and border guards were merged into a single national corps, with the border guards (Határőrség Magyarországon) becoming police officers. This merger took place in January 2008. The Customs and Excise Authority remained subject to the Ministry of Finance under the National Tax and Customs Administration.

=== Administrative divisions ===
Hungary is divided into 19 counties (vármegye). The capital (főváros) Budapest is an independent entity. The counties and the capital are the 20 NUTS third-level units of Hungary. The states are further subdivided into 174 districts (járás). The districts are further divided into towns and villages, of which 25 are designated cities with county rights (megyei jogú város), sometimes known as "urban counties" in English. The local authorities of these towns have extended powers, but these towns belong to the territory of the respective district instead of being independent territorial units. County and district councils and municipalities have different roles and separate responsibilities relating to local government. The role of the counties are basically administrative and focus on strategic development, while preschools, public water utilities, garbage disposal, elderly care, and rescue services are administered by the municipalities.

Since 1996, the counties and city of Budapest have been grouped into seven regions for statistical and development purposes. These seven regions constitute NUTS' second-level units of Hungary. They are Central Hungary, Central Transdanubia, Northern Great Plain, Northern Hungary, Southern Transdanubia, Southern Great Plain, and Western Transdanubia.

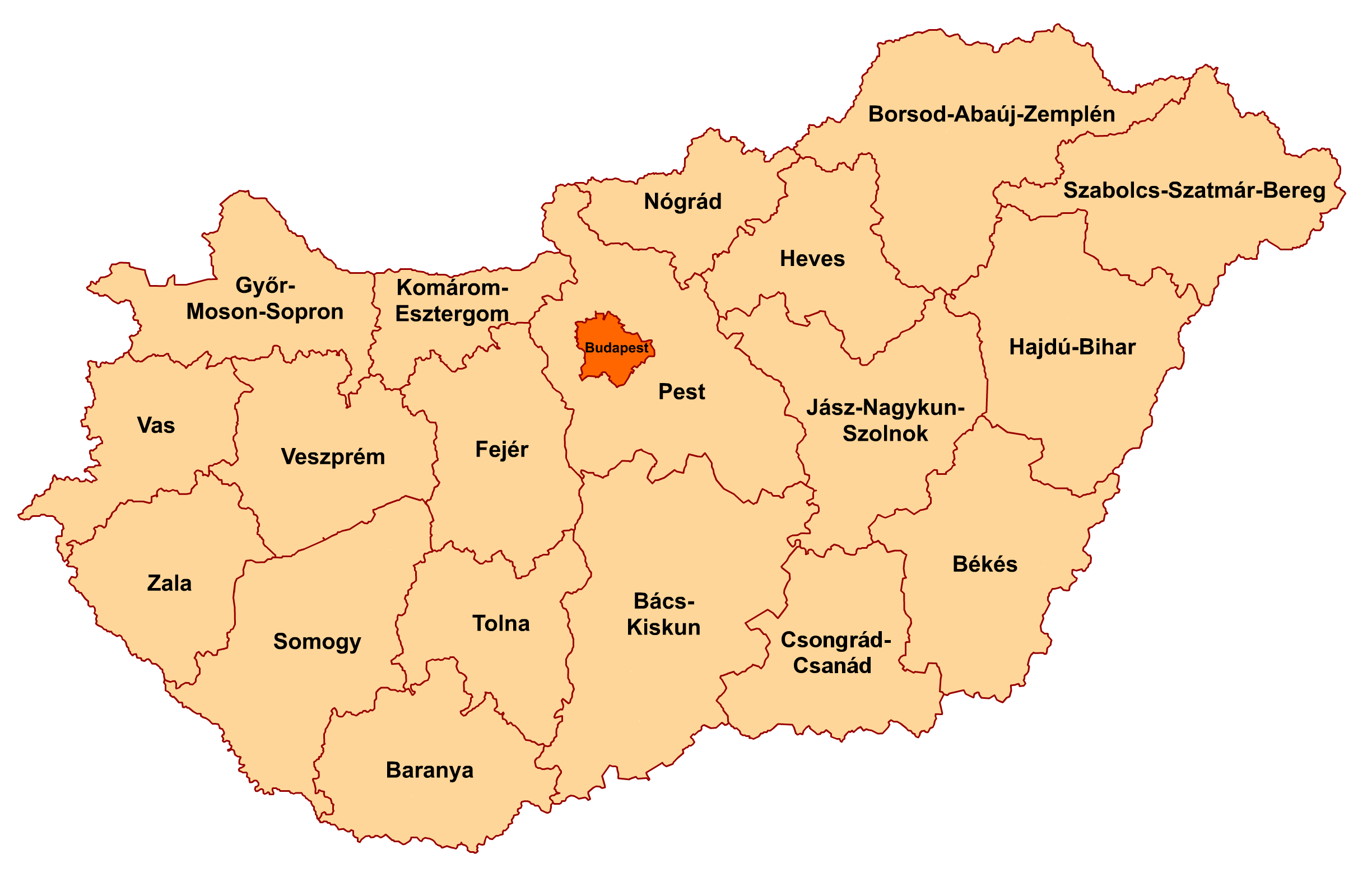
Counties of Hungary

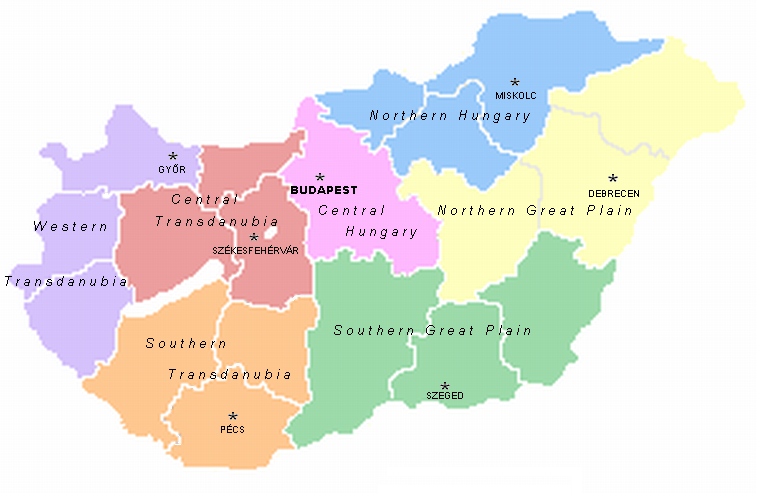
Regions of Hungary

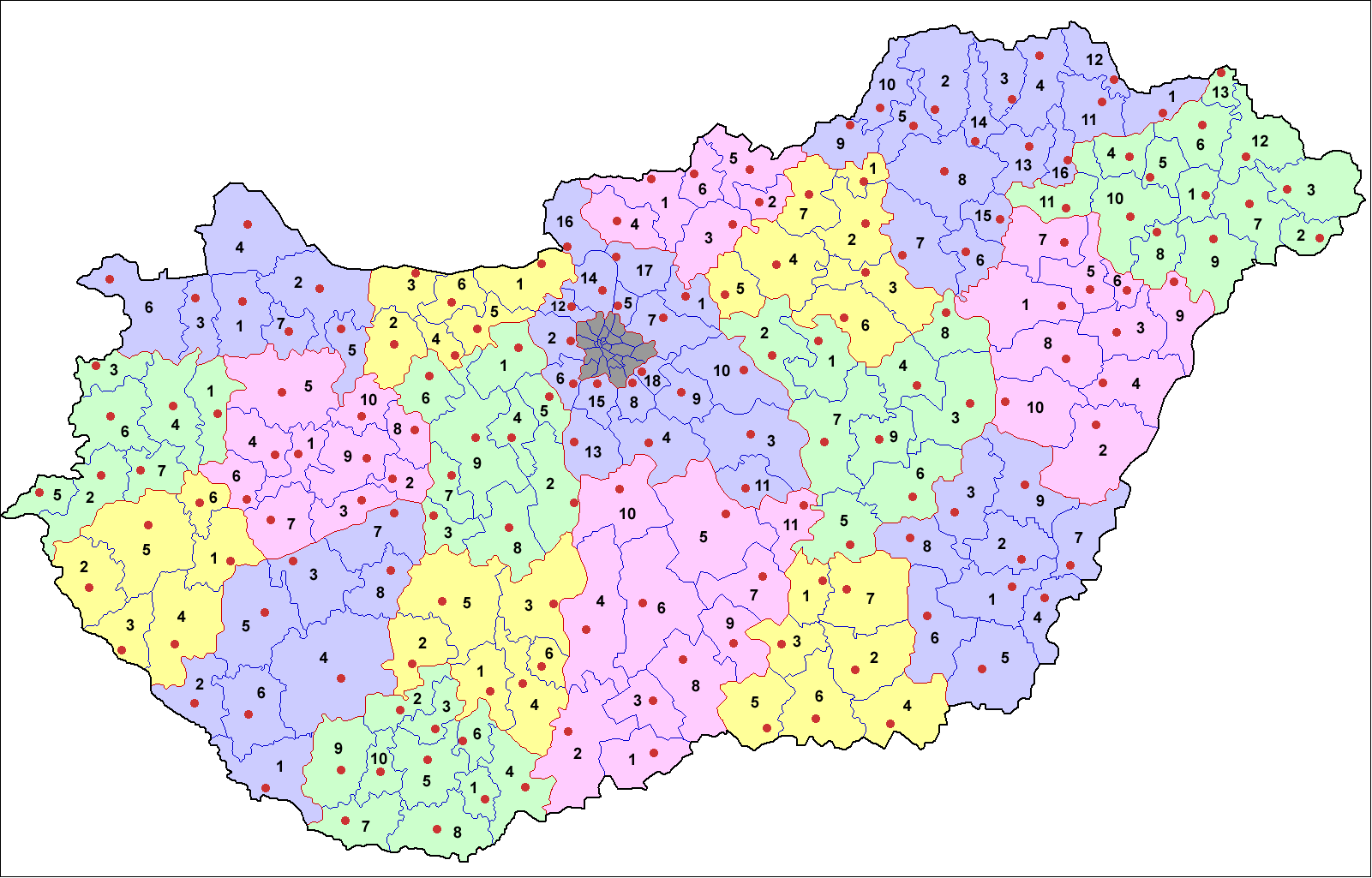
The districts of Hungary

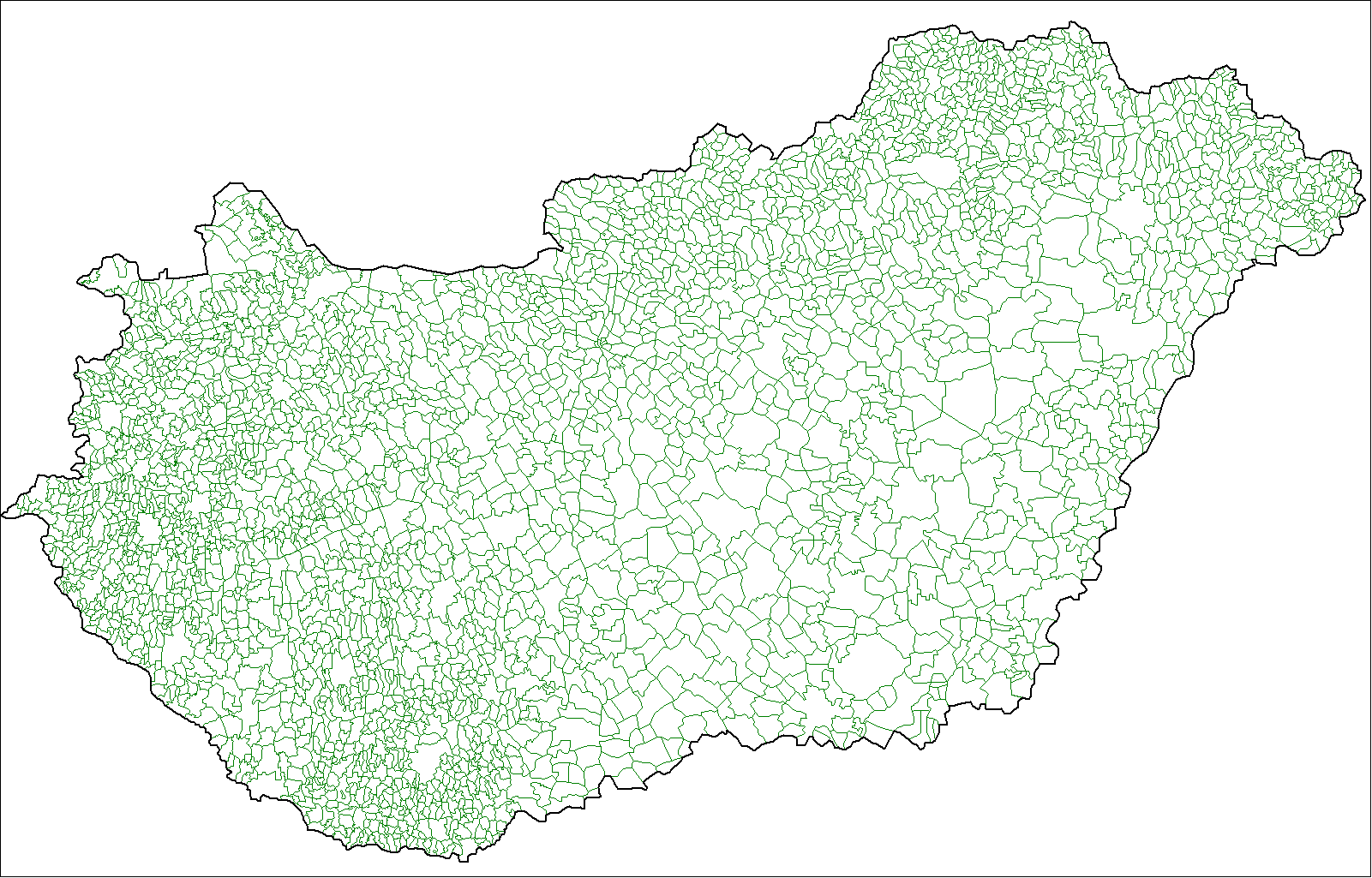
Towns and villages in Hungary

County (vármegye)	Administrative centre	Population	Region
Bács-Kiskun	Kecskemét	524,841	Southern Great Plain
Baranya	Pécs	391,455	Southern Transdanubia
Békés	Békéscsaba	361,802	Southern Great Plain
Borsod-Abaúj-Zemplén	Miskolc	684,793	Northern Hungary
Capital City of Budapest	Budapest	1,744,665	Central Hungary
Csongrád-Csanád	Szeged	421,827	Southern Great Plain
Fejér	Székesfehérvár	426,120	Central Transdanubia
Győr-Moson-Sopron	Győr	449,967	Western Transdanubia
Hajdú-Bihar	Debrecen	565,674	Northern Great Plain
Heves	Eger	307,985	Northern Hungary
Jász-Nagykun-Szolnok	Szolnok	386,752	Northern Great Plain
Komárom-Esztergom	Tatabánya	311,411	Central Transdanubia
Nógrád	Salgótarján	201,919	Northern Hungary
Pest	Budapest	1,237,561	Central Hungary
Somogy	Kaposvár	317,947	Southern Transdanubia
Szabolcs-Szatmár-Bereg	Nyíregyháza	552,000	Northern Great Plain
Tolna	Szekszárd	231,183	Southern Transdanubia
Vas	Szombathely	257,688	Western Transdanubia
Veszprém	Veszprém	353,068	Central Transdanubia
Zala	Zalaegerszeg	287,043	Western Transdanubia

==== Cities and towns ====
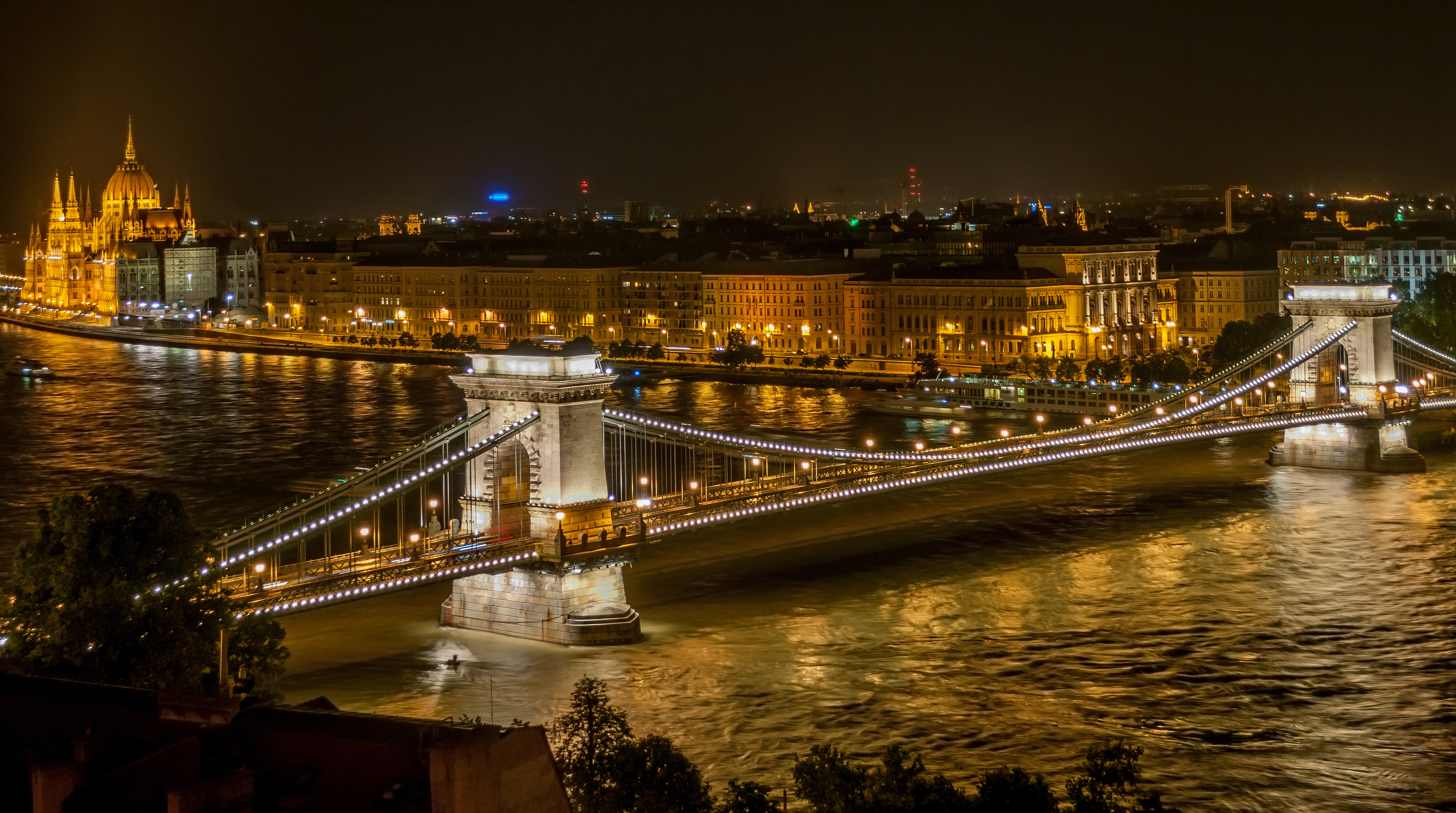
Budapest, the capital and most populous city of Hungary

Hungary has 3,152 municipalities as of 15 July 2013: 346 towns (Hungarian term: város, plural: városok; the terminology does not distinguish between cities and towns – the term town is used in official translations) and 2,806 villages (Hungarian: község, plural: községek) which fully cover the territory of the country. The number of towns can change, since villages can be elevated to town status by act of the president. Budapest has a special status and is not included in any county while 23 of the towns are so-called urban counties (megyei jogú város – town with county rights). All county seats except Budapest are urban counties. Four of the cities (Budapest, Miskolc, Győr, and Pécs) have agglomerations, and the Hungarian Statistical Office distinguishes seventeen other areas in earlier stages of agglomeration development. The largest city is Budapest. The average number of inhabitants per village is 300, but 27 villages have fewer than 100 inhabitants.

=== Foreign relations ===
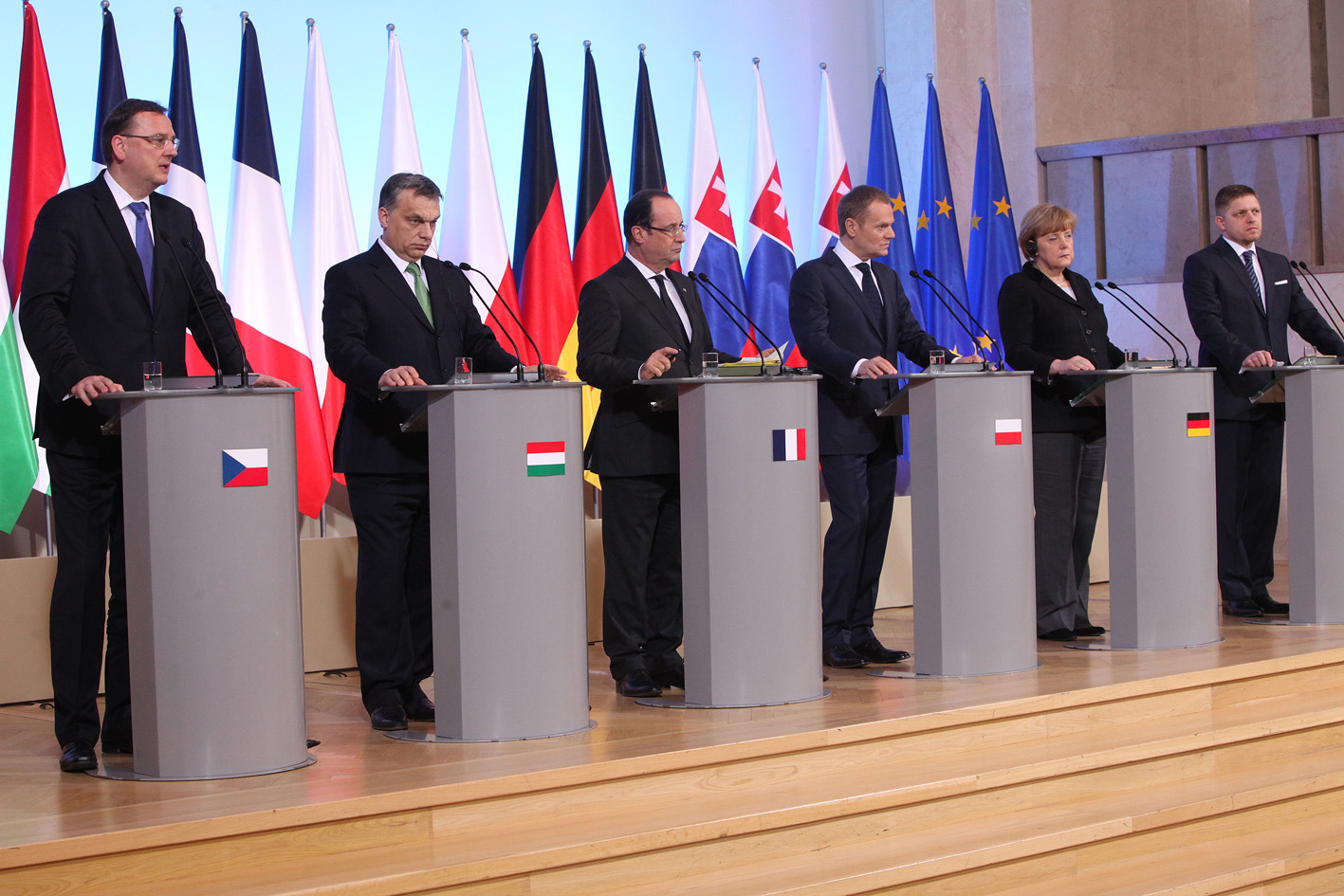
Meeting of the leaders of the Visegrád Group, Germany and France in 2013

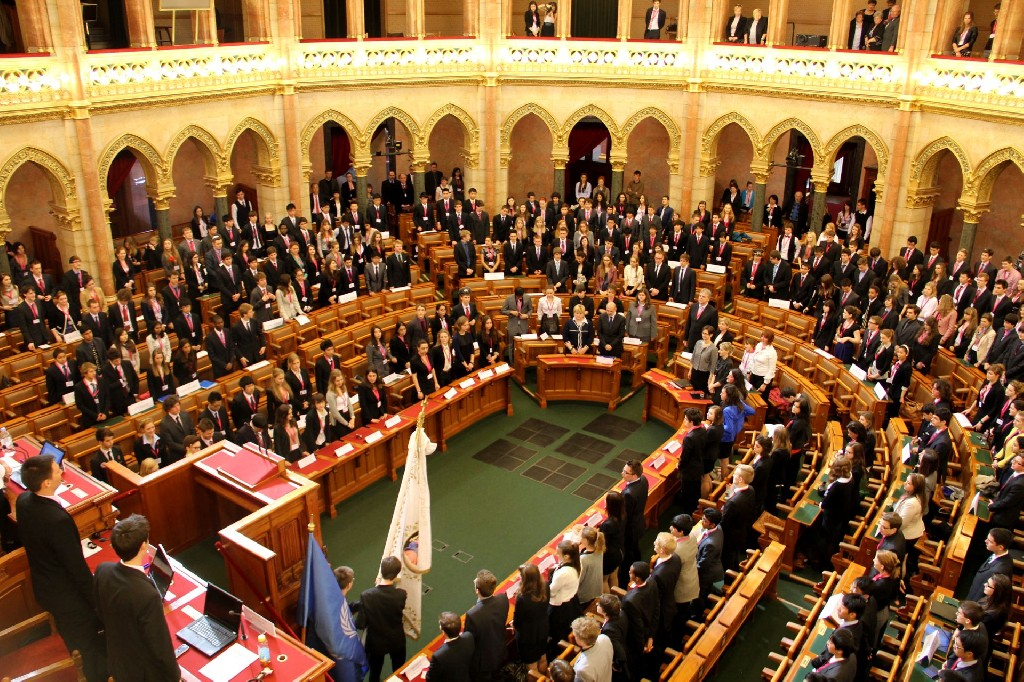
United Nations conference in the assembly hall of the House of Magnates in the Hungarian Parliament Building

The foreign policy is based on four basic commitments: to Atlantic co-operation, to European integration, to international development and to international law. Hungary has been a member of the United Nations since December 1955 and a member of the European Union, NATO, the OECD, the Visegrád Group, the WTO, the Central European Defence Cooperation, the World Bank, the AIIB and the IMF. Hungary took on the presidency of the Council of the European Union for half a year in 2011 and in 2024. In 2015, Hungary was the fifth largest OECD non-DAC donor of development aid in the world, which represents 0.13% of its Gross National Income.

Budapest is home to more than 100 embassies and representative bodies as an international political actor. Hungary hosts the main and regional headquarters of many international organisations as well, including European Institute of Innovation and Technology, European Police College, United Nations High Commissioner for Refugees, Food and Agriculture Organization of the United Nations, International Centre for Democratic Transition, Institute of International Education, International Labour Organization, International Organization for Migration, International Red Cross, Regional Environmental Centre for Central and Eastern Europe, Danube Commission and others.

Since 1989, the top foreign policy goal has been achieving integration into Western economic and security organisations. Hungary joined the Partnership for Peace programme in 1994 and has actively supported the IFOR and SFOR missions in Bosnia. Since 1989 Hungary has improved its often frosty neighbour relations by signing basic treaties with Romania, Slovakia, and Ukraine. These renounce all outstanding territorial claims and lay the foundation for constructive relations. However, the issue of ethnic Hungarian minority rights in Romania, Slovakia, and Serbia periodically cause bilateral tensions to flare up. However, relations with Serbia have more recently become extremely close due to strong Hungarian advocacy for Serbian EU membership, while relations with Slovakia have warmed due to cooperation on shared priorities within EU structures. Since 2017, the relations with Ukraine rapidly deteriorated over the issue of the Hungarian minority in Ukraine. Since 1989, Hungary has signed all of the OSCE documents, and served as the OSCE's Chairman-in-Office in 1997. Historically, Hungary has had particularly friendly relations with Poland; this special relationship was recognised by the parliaments of both countries in 2007 with the joint declaration of 23 March as "The Day of Polish-Hungarian Friendship". According to the 2024 Global Peace Index, Hungary is the 14th most peaceful country in the world.

=== Military ===
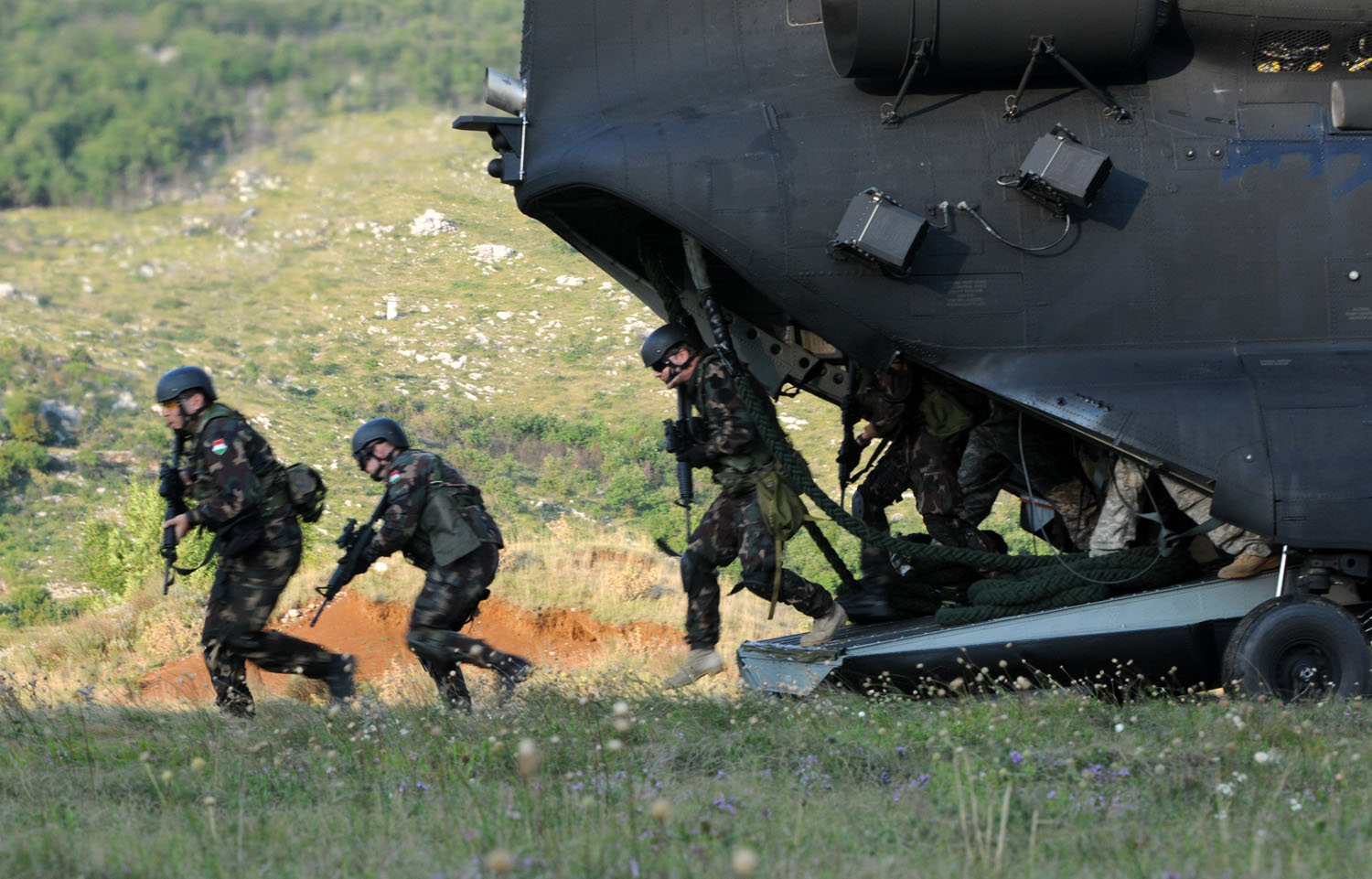
HDF 34th Special Forces Battalion

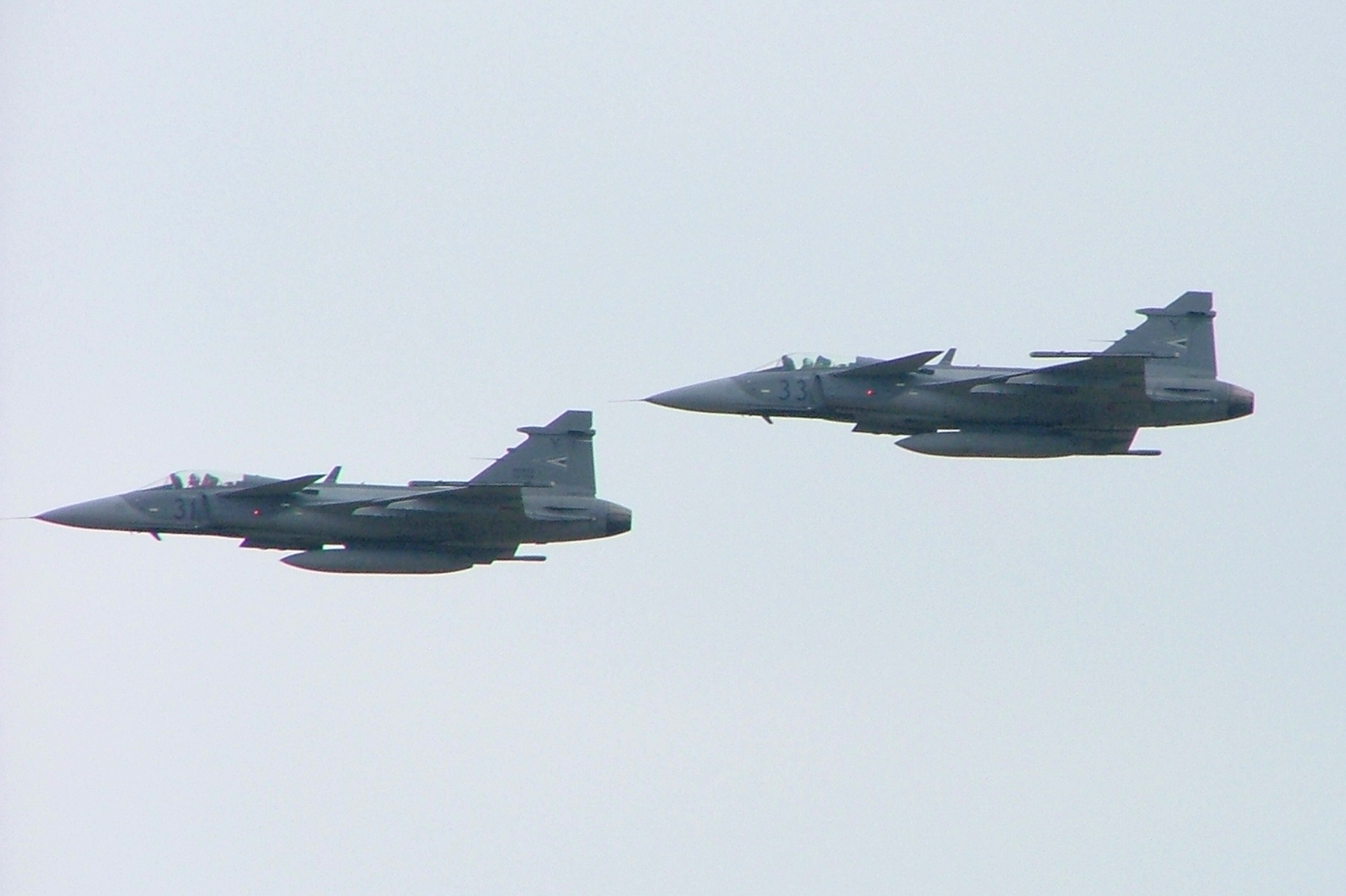
JAS 39 Gripen multirole combat aircraft

The president holds the title of commander-in-chief of the nation's armed forces. The Ministry of Defence jointly with chief of staff administers the armed forces, including the Hungarian Ground Force (HDF) and the Hungarian Air Force. Since 2007, the Hungarian Armed Forces has been under a unified command structure. The Ministry of Defence maintains political and civil control over the army. A subordinate Joint Forces Command coordinates and commands the HDF. In 2016, the armed forces had 31,080 personnel on active duty, the operative reserve brought the total number of troops to fifty thousand. In 2016, it was planned that military spending the following year would be $1.21 billion, about 0.94% of the country's GDP, well below the NATO target of 2%. In 2012, the government adopted a resolution in which it pledged to increase defence spending to 1.4% of GDP by 2022.

Military service is voluntary, though conscription may occur in wartime. In a significant move for modernisation, Hungary decided in 2001 to buy 14 JAS 39 Gripen fighter aircraft for about 800 million EUR. Hungarian National Cyber Security Centre was re-organised in 2016 in order to become more efficient through cyber security. In 2016, the Hungarian military had about 700 troops stationed in foreign countries as part of international peacekeeping forces, including 100 HDF troops in the NATO-led ISAF force in Afghanistan, 210 Hungarian soldiers in Kosovo under command of KFOR, and 160 troops in Bosnia and Herzegovina. Hungary sent a 300-strong logistics unit to Iraq in order to help the U.S. occupation with armed transport convoys, though public opinion opposed the country's participation in the war.

== Economy ==
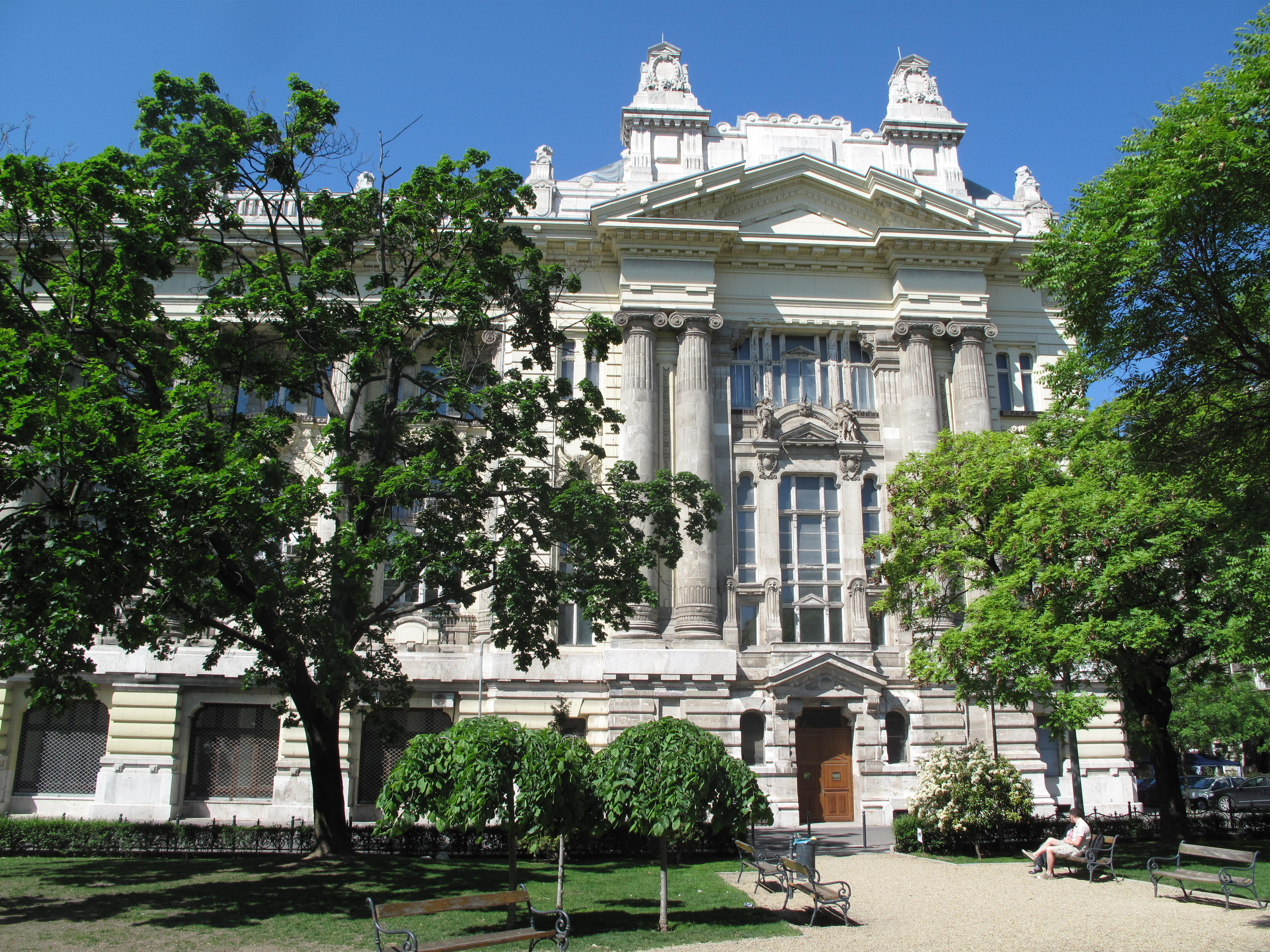
Hungarian Stock Exchange Palace on Liberty Square

Hungary is an OECD high-income mixed economy with a very high human development index and skilled labour force with the 16th lowest income inequality in the world. Furthermore, it is the 9th most complex economy according to the Economic Complexity Index. The economy is the 57th-largest in the world (out of 188 countries measured by IMF) with $265.037 billion output and ranks 49th in the world in terms of GDP per capita by purchasing power parity. The annual median equivalised disposable income was $15,361 (PPP) in 2021. The employment rate was 68.3% in 2017; the employment structure shows the characteristics of post-industrial economies, 63.2% of employed workforce work in service sector, the industry contributed by 29.7%, while agriculture with 7.1%. Unemployment rate was 4.1% in 2017, down from 11% during the 2008 financial crisis.

Hungary is part of the European single market which represents more than 508 million consumers. Several domestic commercial policies are determined by agreements among European Union members and by EU legislation. Hungary is an export-oriented market economy with a heavy emphasis on foreign trade, thus the country is the 36th largest export economy in the world. The country has more than $100 billion export in 2015 with high, $9.003 billion trade surplus, of which 79% went to the EU and 21% was extra-EU trade. Hungary has a more than 80% privately owned economy with 39.1% overall taxation, which provides the basis for the country's welfare economy. On the expenditure side, household consumption is the main component of GDP and accounts for 50% of its total use, followed by gross fixed capital formation with 22% and government expenditure with 20%.

Hungary continues to be one of the leading nations for attracting foreign direct investment (FDI) in Central and Eastern Europe; the inward FDI in the country was $119.8 billion in 2015, while investing more than $50 billion abroad. As of 2015, the key trading partners were Germany, Austria, Romania, Slovakia, France, Italy, Poland and Czech Republic. Major industries include food processing, pharmaceuticals, motor vehicles, information technology, chemicals, metallurgy, machinery, electrical goods, and tourism (with 12.1 million international tourists in 2014). Hungary is the largest electronics producer in Central and Eastern Europe. Electronics manufacturing and research are among the main drivers of innovation and economic growth in the country. In the past 20 years Hungary has also grown into a major centre for mobile technology, information security, and related hardware research.

Large Hungarian companies are included in the BUX, the stock market index listed on Budapest Stock Exchange. Well-known companies include the Fortune Global 500 firm MOL Group, the OTP Bank, Gedeon Richter Plc., Magyar Telekom, CIG Pannonia, FHB Bank, Zwack Unicum and more. Besides this Hungary has a large portion of specialised small and medium enterprise, for example a significant number of automotive suppliers and technology start ups among others.

Budapest is the financial and business capital, classified as an Beta+ world city in the study by the Globalization and World Cities Research Network. Budapest is the primate city of Hungary regarding business and economy, accounting for 39% of the national income, the city has a gross metropolitan product more than $100 billion in 2015, making it one of the largest regional economies in the European Union. Budapest is also among the Top 100 GDP performing cities in the world, measured by PricewaterhouseCoopers.

Hungary maintains its own currency, the Hungarian forint (HUF), although the economy fulfills the Maastricht criteria with the exception of public debt, but it is also significantly below the EU average with the level of 75.3% in 2015. The Hungarian National Bank is currently focusing on price stability with an inflation target of 3%. Hungary's corporate tax rate is only 9%, which is relatively low for EU states.

=== Science and technology ===
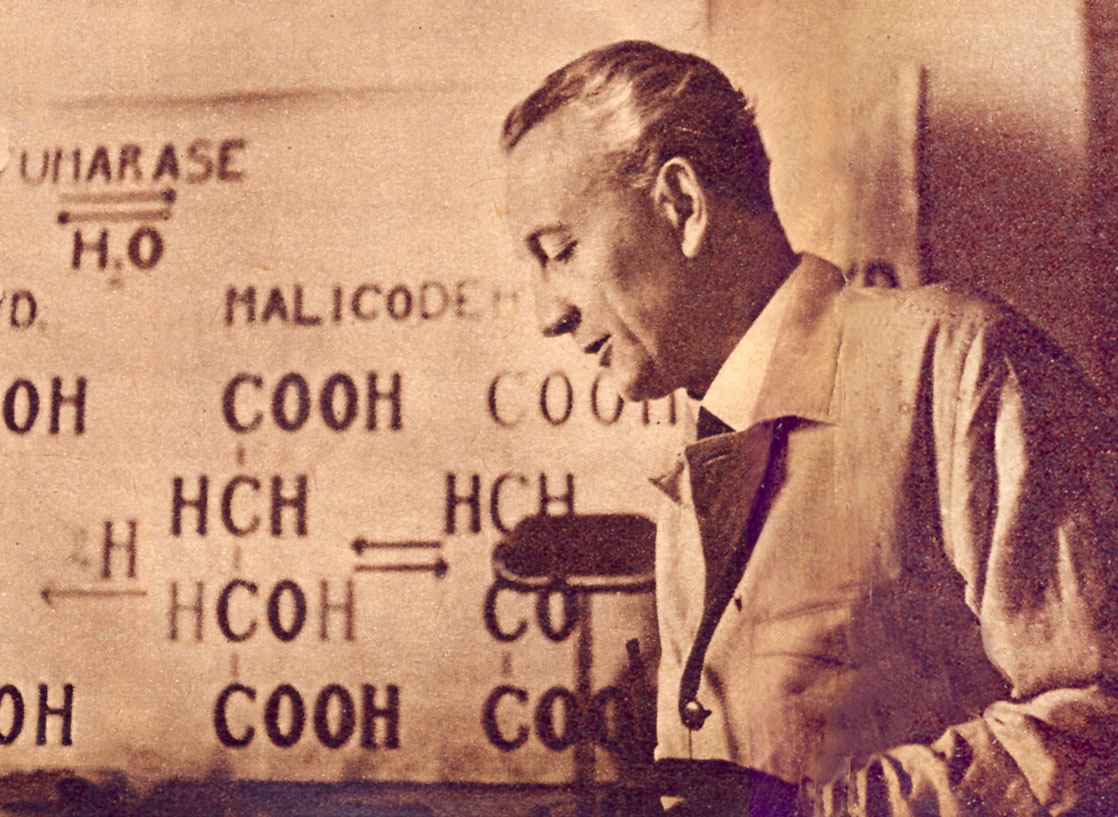
Albert Szent-Györgyi won the Nobel Prize in Physiology or Medicine for his discovery of Vitamin C. The Nobel Prize has been awarded to 15 Hungarians.

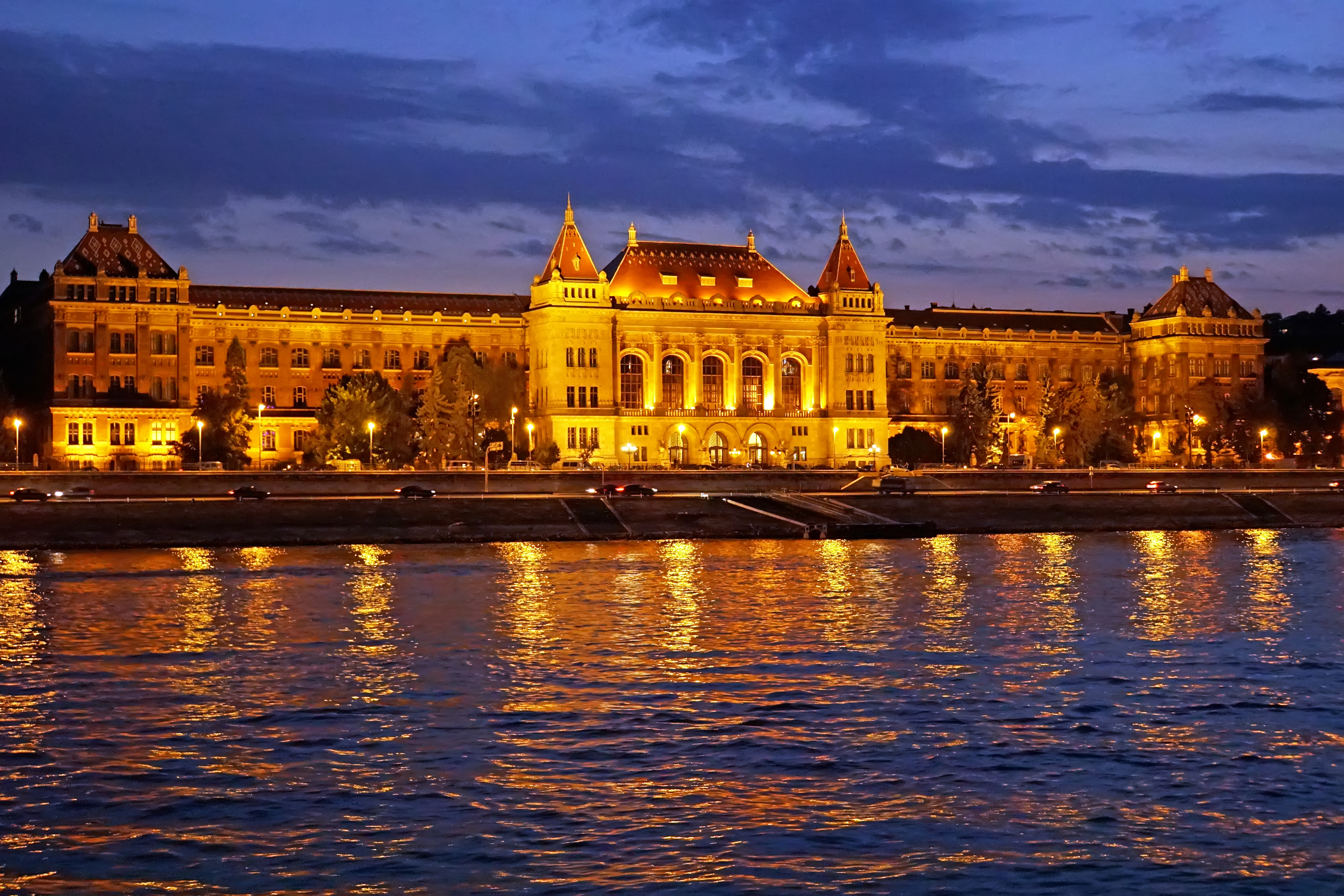
Founded in 1782, the Budapest University of Technology and Economics is the oldest institute of technology in the world.

Hungary's achievements in science and technology have been significant, and research and development efforts form an integral part of the country's economy. Hungary spent 1.61% of its gross domestic product (GDP) on civil research and development in 2020, which is the 25th highest ratio in the world. Hungary ranks 32nd among the most innovative countries in the Bloomberg Innovation Index. Hungary was ranked 36th in the Global Innovation Index in 2025. In 2014, Hungary counted 2,651 full-time equivalent researchers per million inhabitants, steadily increasing from 2,131 in 2010 and compares with 3,984 in the U.S. or 4,380 in Germany. Hungary's high technology industry has benefited from both the country's skilled workforce and the strong presence of foreign high-tech firms and research centres. Hungary also has one of the highest rates of filed patents, the sixth highest ratio of high-tech and medium high-tech output in the total industrial output, the 12th highest research FDI inflow, placed 14th in research talent in business enterprise and has the 17th best overall innovation efficiency ratio in the world.

The key actor of research and development in Hungary is the National Research, Development and Innovation (NRDI) Office, which is a national strategic and funding agency for scientific research, development and innovation, the primary source of advice on RDI policy for the Hungarian government and the primary RDI funding agency. Its role is to develop RDI policy and ensure that Hungary adequately invest in RDI by funding excellent research and supporting innovation to increase competitiveness and to prepare the RDI strategy of the government, to handle the NRDI Fund and represents the government and RDI community in international organisations.

Scientific research is supported partly by industry and partly by the state, through universities and by scientific state-institutions such as Hungarian Academy of Sciences. Hungary has been the home of some of the most prominent researchers in various scientific disciplines, notably physics, mathematics, chemistry and engineering. As of 2018, thirteen Hungarian scientists have been recipients of a Nobel Prize. Until 2012 three individuals—Csoma, János Bolyai and Tihanyi—were included in the UNESCO Memory of the World register as well as the collective contributions Tabula Hungariae and Bibliotheca Corviniana. Contemporary scientists include mathematician László Lovász, physicist Albert-László Barabási, physicist Ferenc Krausz, and biochemist Árpád Pusztai. Hungary has excellent mathematics education which has trained numerous outstanding scientists. Famous Hungarian mathematicians include father Farkas Bolyai and son János Bolyai, who was one of the founders of non-Euclidean geometry; Paul Erdős, famed for publishing in over forty languages and whose Erdős numbers are still tracked, and John von Neumann, a key contributor in the fields of quantum mechanics and game theory, a pioneer of digital computing, and the chief mathematician in the Manhattan Project. Notable Hungarian inventions include the lead dioxide match (János Irinyi), a type of carburetor (Donát Bánki, János Csonka), the electric (AC) train engine and generator (Kálmán Kandó), holography (Dennis Gabor), the Kalman filter (Rudolf E. Kálmán), and Rubik's Cube (Ernő Rubik).

=== Transport ===
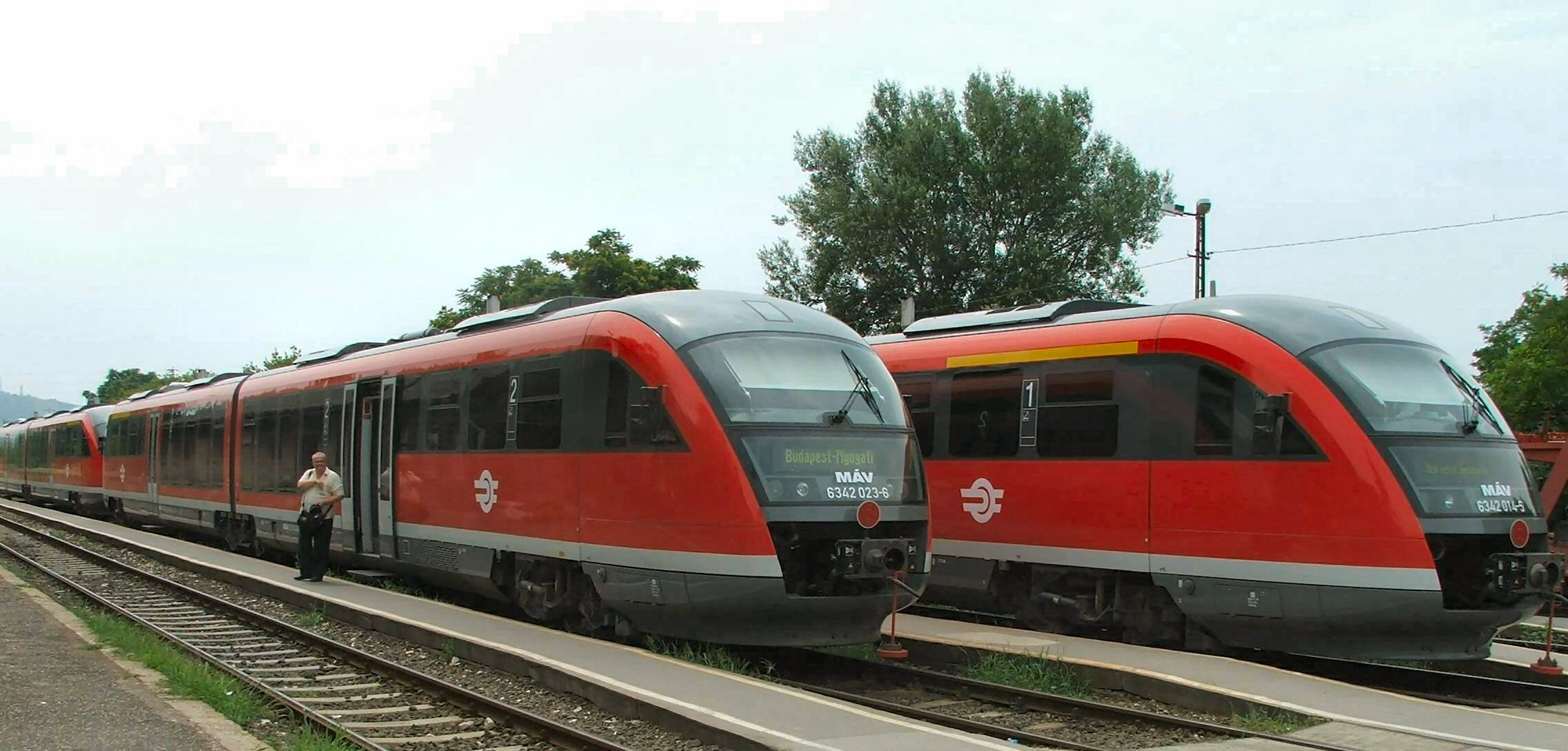
Siemens Desiro passenger trains on the Hungarian State Railways network, which is one of the densest in the world

Hungary has a highly developed road, railway, air, and water transport system. Budapest serves as an important hub for the Hungarian railway system (MÁV). The capital is served by three large train stations called Keleti (Eastern), Nyugati (Western), and Déli (Southern) pályaudvars (termii). Szolnok is the most important railway hub outside Budapest, while Tiszai Railway Station in Miskolc and the main stations of Szombathely, Győr, Szeged, and Székesfehérvár are also key to the network.

Since March 2024, transport on the Hungarian railway MÁV has been free for people aged 65 and over or under 14 years of age.

Budapest, Debrecen, Miskolc, and Szeged have tram networks. The Budapest Metro is the second-oldest underground metro system in the world; its Line 1 dates from 1896. The system consists of four lines. A commuter rail system, HÉV, operates in the Budapest metropolitan area. Hungary has a total length of approximately 1,314 km (816.48 mi) motorways (Hungarian: autópálya). Motorway sections are being added to the existing network, which already connects many major economically important cities to the capital. Ports are located at Budapest, Dunaújváros and Baja.

There are five international airports: Budapest Ferenc Liszt (informally called "Ferihegy"), Debrecen, Hévíz–Balaton (also called Sármellék Airport), Győr-Pér, and Pécs-Pogány, but only two of these (Budapest and Debrecen) receive scheduled flights. Low-budget airline Wizz Air is based at Ferihegy.

=== Energy ===
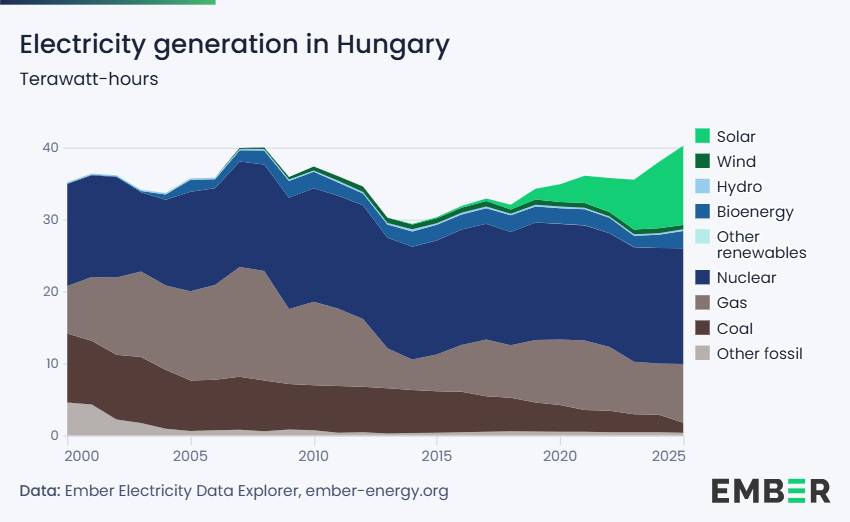
Electricity generation in Hungary in terawatt-hours

Hungary's total energy supply is dominated by fossil fuels, with natural gas occupying the largest share, followed by oil and coal. In June 2020, Hungary passed a law binding itself to a target of net-zero emissions by 2050. As part of a broader restructuring of the nation's energy and climate policies, Hungary also extended its National Energy Strategy 2030 to look even further, adding an outlook until 2040 that prioritises carbon-neutral and cost-effective energy while focusing on reinforcing energy security and energy independence. Key forces in the country's 2050 target include renewables, nuclear electricity, and electrification of end-use sectors. Significant investments in the power sector are expected, including for the construction of two new nuclear energy generating units. Renewable energy capacity has increased significantly, but in recent years growth in the renewables sector has stagnated. What is more, certain policies that limit development of wind power are expected to negatively impact the renewables sector.

Hungary's emission of greenhouse gases has dropped alongside the economy's decreasing use of carbon-based fuels. However, independent analysis has identified space for Hungary to set more ambitious emissions reduction targets.

== Demographics ==
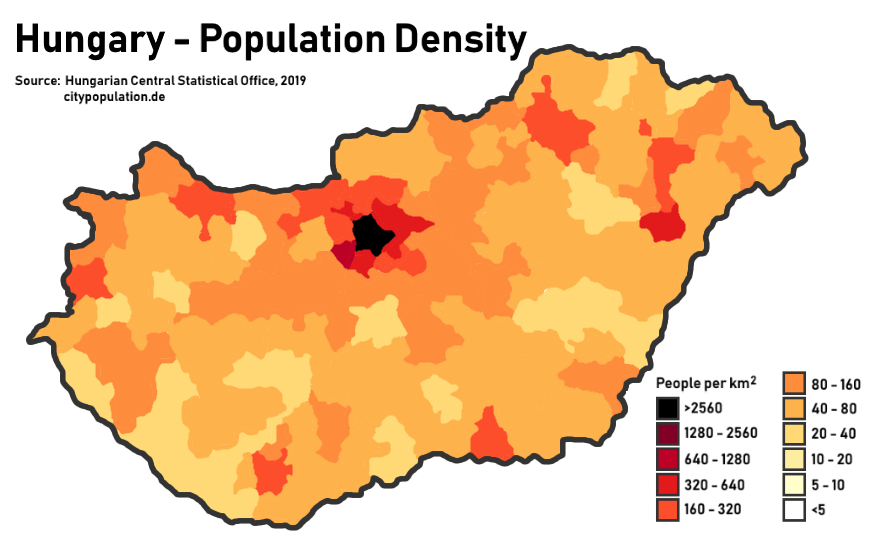
Population density in Hungary by district

Hungary's population was 9,689,000 in 2021, according to the Hungarian Central Statistical Office, making it the fifth most populous country in Central and Eastern Europe, and a medium-sized member state of the European Union. As in other former Eastern bloc countries, its population has decreased markedly since the fall of communism, having peaked at 10.8 million in 1980. Population density stands at 107 inhabitants per square kilometre, which is about two times higher than the world average. Around 70% of the population lives in cities and towns overall, which is well above the global rate of 56% but lower than in most developed countries; one quarter of Hungarians live in the Budapest metropolitan area in north-central region.

Like most European countries, Hungary is experiencing sub-replacement fertility; its estimated total fertility rate of 1.43 children per woman is well below the replacement rate of 2.1. Consequently, its population has been gradually declining and rapidly aging; the average age is 42.7 years, among the highest in the world. This trend has been exacerbated by a high rate of emigration, particularly among young adults, and anti-immigration policies, which accelerated in the 1990s but have since somewhat abated.

In 2011, the conservative government began a programme to increase the birth rate among ethnic Magyars by reinstating three-year maternity leave and boosting the availability of part-time jobs; the fertility rate has since gradually increased from its nadir of 1.27 children per woman in 2011, in some years rising as high as 1.5. In 2015, 47.9% of births were to unmarried women. Life expectancy was 71.96 years for men and 79.62 years for women in 2015, growing continuously since the fall of Communism.

Hungary recognises two sizeable minority groups, designated as "national minorities" because their ancestors have lived in their respective regions for centuries in Hungary: a German community of about 130,000 that lives throughout the country, and a Romani minority that numbers around 300,000 and mainly resides in the northern part of the country. Some studies indicate a considerably larger number of Romani in Hungary (876,000 people – c. 9% of the population.). According to the 2011 census, there were 8,314,029 (83.7%) ethnic Hungarians, 308,957 (3.1%) Romani, 131,951 (1.3%) Germans, 29,647 (0.3%) Slovaks, 26,345 (0.3%) Romanians, and 23,561 (0.2%) Croats in Hungary; 1,455,883 people (14.7% of the total population) did not declare their ethnicity. Thus, Hungarians made up more than 90% of people who declared their ethnicity. In Hungary, people can declare more than one ethnicity, so the sum of ethnicities is higher than the total population.

Approximately 5 million Hungarians live outside Hungary.

Largest cities or towns in Hungary Hungarian Central Statistical Office - 2022 Census
Rank	Name	County	Pop.	Rank	Name	County	Pop.
1	Budapest	Budapest	1,685,342	11	Érd	Pest	71,253
2	Debrecen	Hajdú-Bihar	199,858	12	Szolnok	Jász-Nagykun-Szolnok	66,061
3	Szeged	Csongrád-Csanád	158,797	13	Tatabánya	Komárom-Esztergom	65,830
4	Miskolc	Borsod-Abaúj-Zemplén	147,533	14	Sopron	Győr-Moson-Sopron	60,334
5	Pécs	Baranya	139,330	15	Kaposvár	Somogy	59,397
6	Győr	Győr-Moson-Sopron	127,599	16	Veszprém	Veszprém	55,910
7	Nyíregyháza	Szabolcs-Szatmár-Bereg	116,282	17	Békéscsaba	Békés	55,164
8	Kecskemét	Bács-Kiskun	108,120	18	Zalaegerszeg	Zala	54,428
9	Székesfehérvár	Fejér	95,045	19	Eger	Heves	49,128
10	Szombathely	Vas	78,190	20	Dunakeszi	Pest	43,858

=== Languages ===
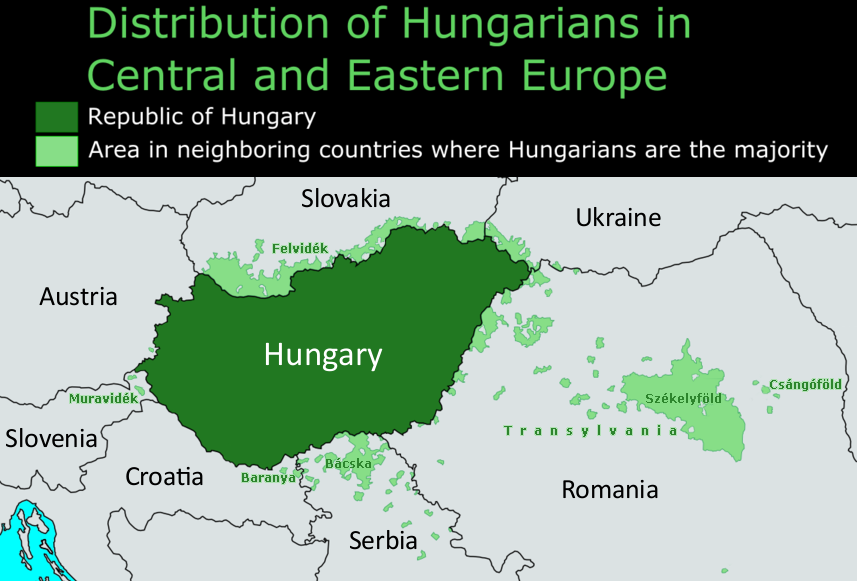
Regions of Central and Eastern Europe inhabited by Hungarian speakers today

Hungarian is the official and predominant spoken language. Hungarian is the 13th most widely spoken first language in Europe with around 13 million native speakers and it is one of 24 official and working languages of the European Union. Outside Hungary, it is also spoken in neighbouring countries and by Hungarian diaspora communities worldwide. According to the 2011 census, 9,896,333 people (99.6%) speak Hungarian in Hungary, of whom 9,827,875 people (99%) speak it as a first language, while 68,458 people (0.7%) speak it as a second language. English (1,589,180 speakers, 16.0%), and German (1,111,997 speakers, 11.2%) are the most widely spoken foreign languages, while there are several recognised minority languages in Hungary (Armenian, Bulgarian, Croatian, German, Greek, Romanian, Romani, Rusyn, Serbian, Slovak, Slovenian, and Ukrainian).

Hungarian is a member of the Uralic language family, unrelated to any neighbouring language and distantly related to Finnish and Estonian. It is the largest of the Uralic languages in terms of the number of speakers and the only one spoken in Central Europe. Standard Hungarian is based on the variety spoken in Budapest. Although the use of the standard dialect is enforced, Hungarian has several urban and rural dialects.

=== Religion ===
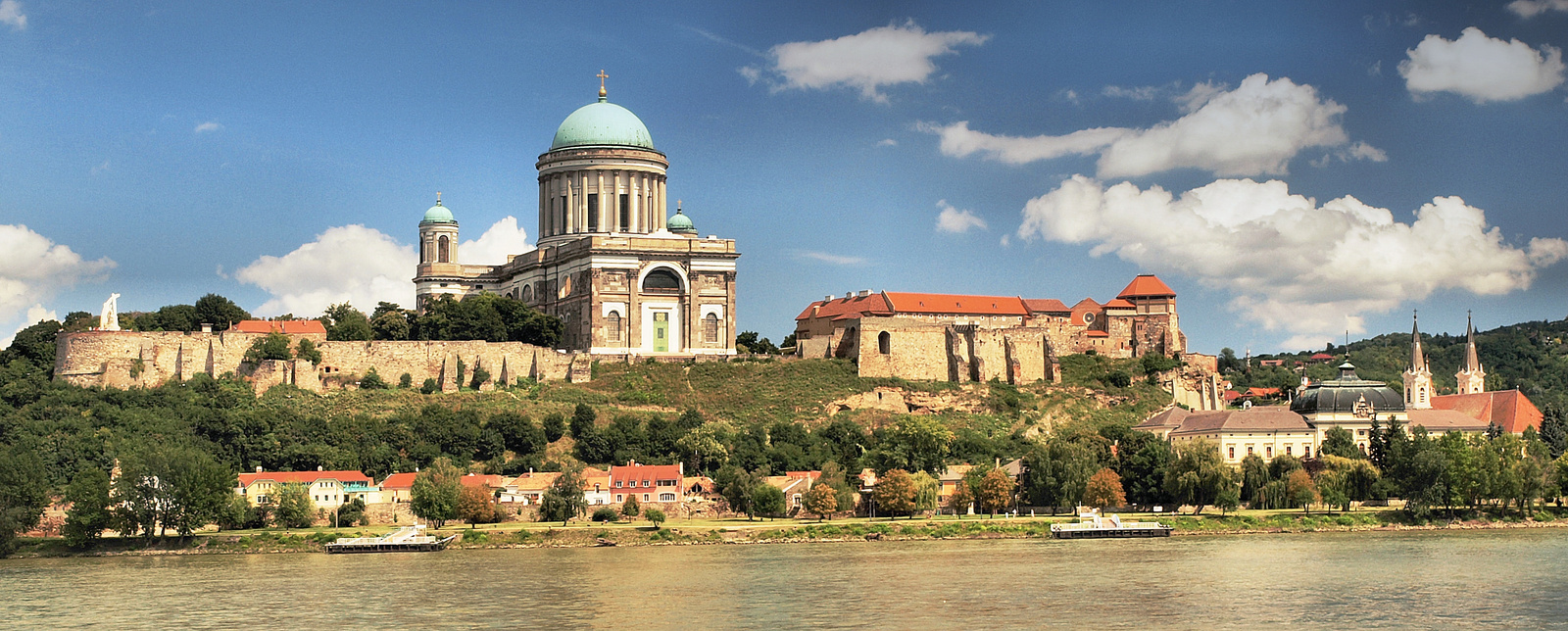
Basilica in Esztergom, where the headquarters of the Hungarian Catholic Church is located

Hungary is an historically Christian country. Hungarian historiography identifies the foundation of the Hungarian state with Stephen I's baptism and coronation with the Holy Crown in A.D. 1000. Stephen promulgated Catholicism as the state religion, and his successors were traditionally known as the Apostolic Kings. The Catholic Church in Hungary remained strong through the centuries, and the Archbishop of Esztergom was granted extraordinary temporal privileges as prince-primate (hercegprímás) of Hungary. The transition to statehood occurred at the turn of the 1st to 2nd millennium when the federation of Magyar tribes was transformed into the Kingdom of Hungary, and Western Christianity, specifically Roman Catholicism, was adopted as state religion.

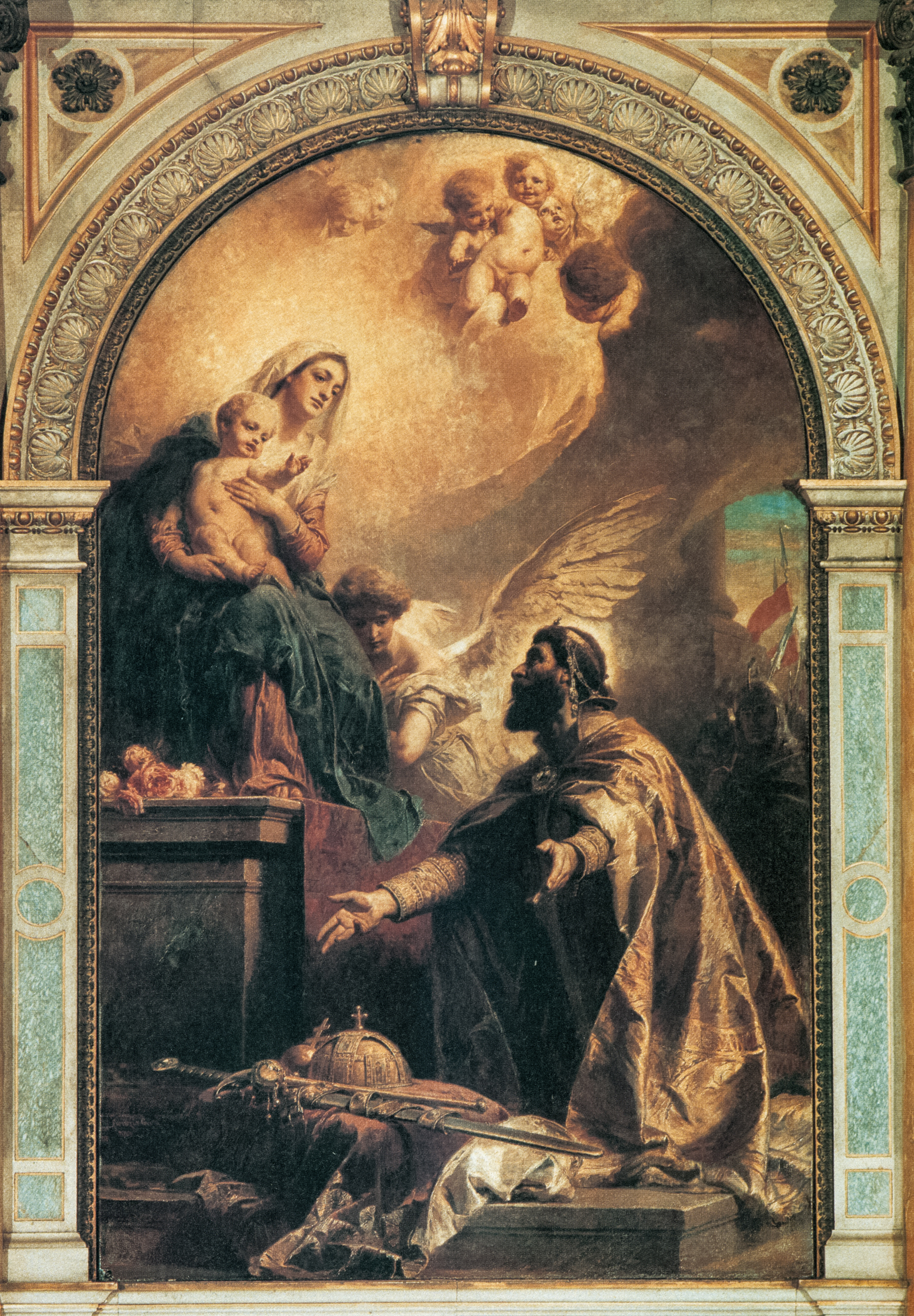
King Saint Stephen offering the Hungarian crown to Virgin Mary – painting by Gyula Benczúr, in the St. Stephen's Basilica, Budapest

Contemporary Hungary has no official religion and recognises freedom of religion as a fundamental right. However, the constitution "recognises Christianity's nation-building role" in its preamble, and in Article VII affirms that "the state may cooperate with the churches for community goals." The 2022 census showed that 42.5% of the Hungarians were Christians, most of whom were Roman Catholics (római katolikusok) (27.5%) and Hungarian Reformed Calvinists (reformátusok) (9.8%), followed by Lutherans (evangélikusok) (1.8%), Greek Catholics (1.7%), and other Christians (1.7%). Religious minorities include Jews (0.1%), Buddhists (0.1%) and Muslims (0.1%). A large plurality of the population (40.1%) did not declare a religious affiliation, while 16.1% declared themselves explicitly irreligious.

During the initial stages of the Protestant Reformation, most Hungarians adopted first Lutheranism and then Calvinism in the form of the Hungarian Reformed Church. Key figures in the Calvinist movement included Márton Kálmáncsehi (1500–1550) and Péter Melius Juhász (1532–1572). Melius Juhász played a pivotal role in translating the Bible and other religious texts into Hungarian, and he established Debrecen in the Great Plain as the heart of Hungarian Calvinism, earning it the titles "Hungarian Geneva" or "the Calvinist Rome." In the second half of the 16th century, the Jesuits led a Counter-Reformation campaign, and the population once again became predominantly Catholic. This campaign was only partially successful, however, and the (mainly Reformed) Hungarian nobility were able to secure freedom of worship for Protestants. In practice, this meant cuius regio, eius religio; thus, most individual localities in Hungary are still identifiable as historically Catholic, Lutheran, or Reformed. The country's eastern regions, especially around Debrecen, remain almost completely Reformed, a trait shared with historically contiguous ethnically Hungarian regions across the Romanian border. Orthodox Christianity in Hungary is associated with the country's ethnic minorities: Armenians, Bulgarians, Greeks, Romanians, Rusyns, Ukrainians, and Serbs.

Historically, Hungary was home to a significant Jewish community, with a pre-World War II population of more than 800,000; however, it is estimated that just over 564,000 Hungarian Jews were killed between 1941 and 1945 during the Holocaust in Hungary. Between 15 May and 9 July 1944 alone, over 434,000 Jews were deported. Of over 800,000 Jews living within Hungary's borders in 1941–1944, about 255,500 are thought to have survived. There are about 120,000 Jews in Hungary today.

=== Education ===
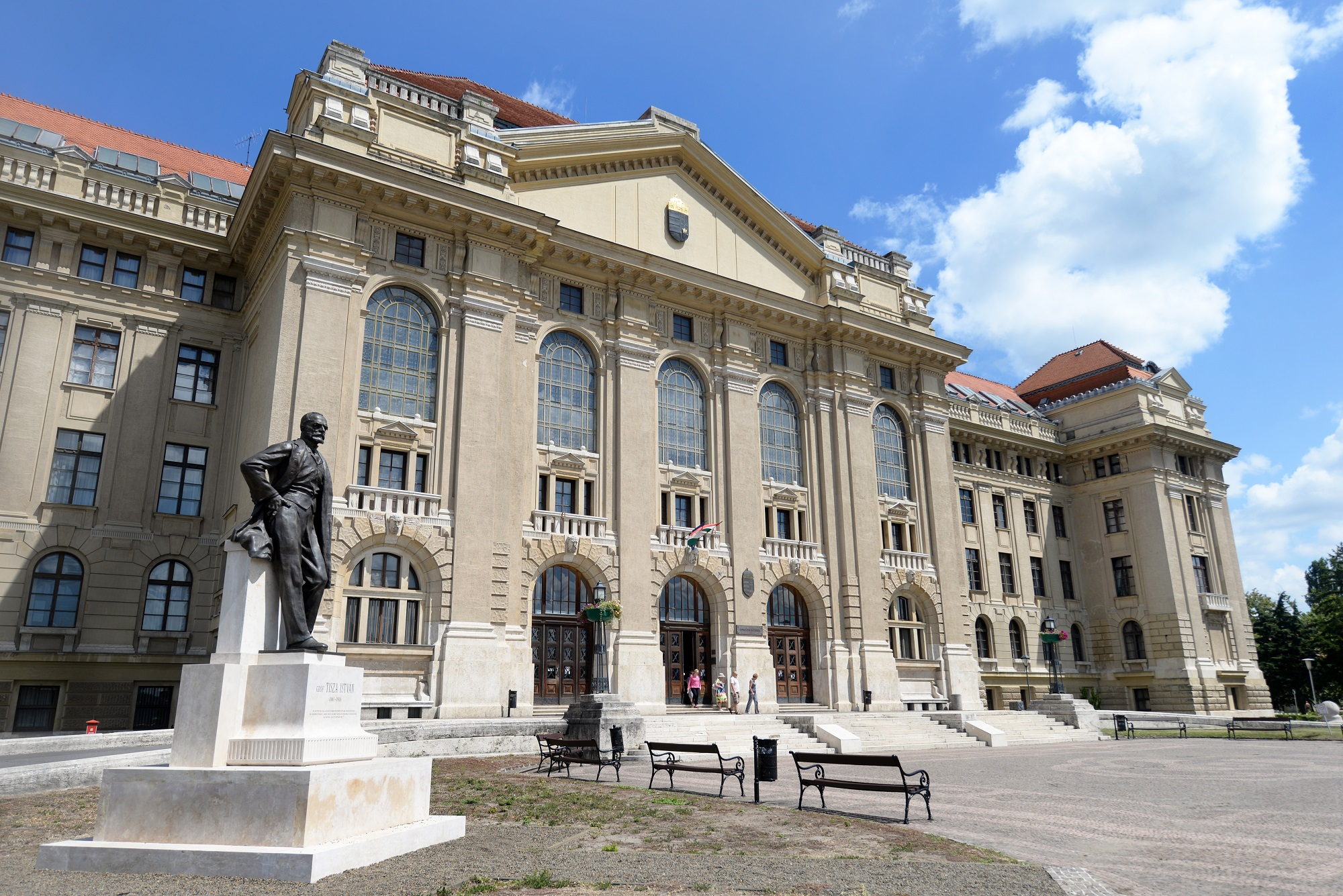
University of Debrecen is the oldest continuously operating institution of higher education in Hungary (1538).

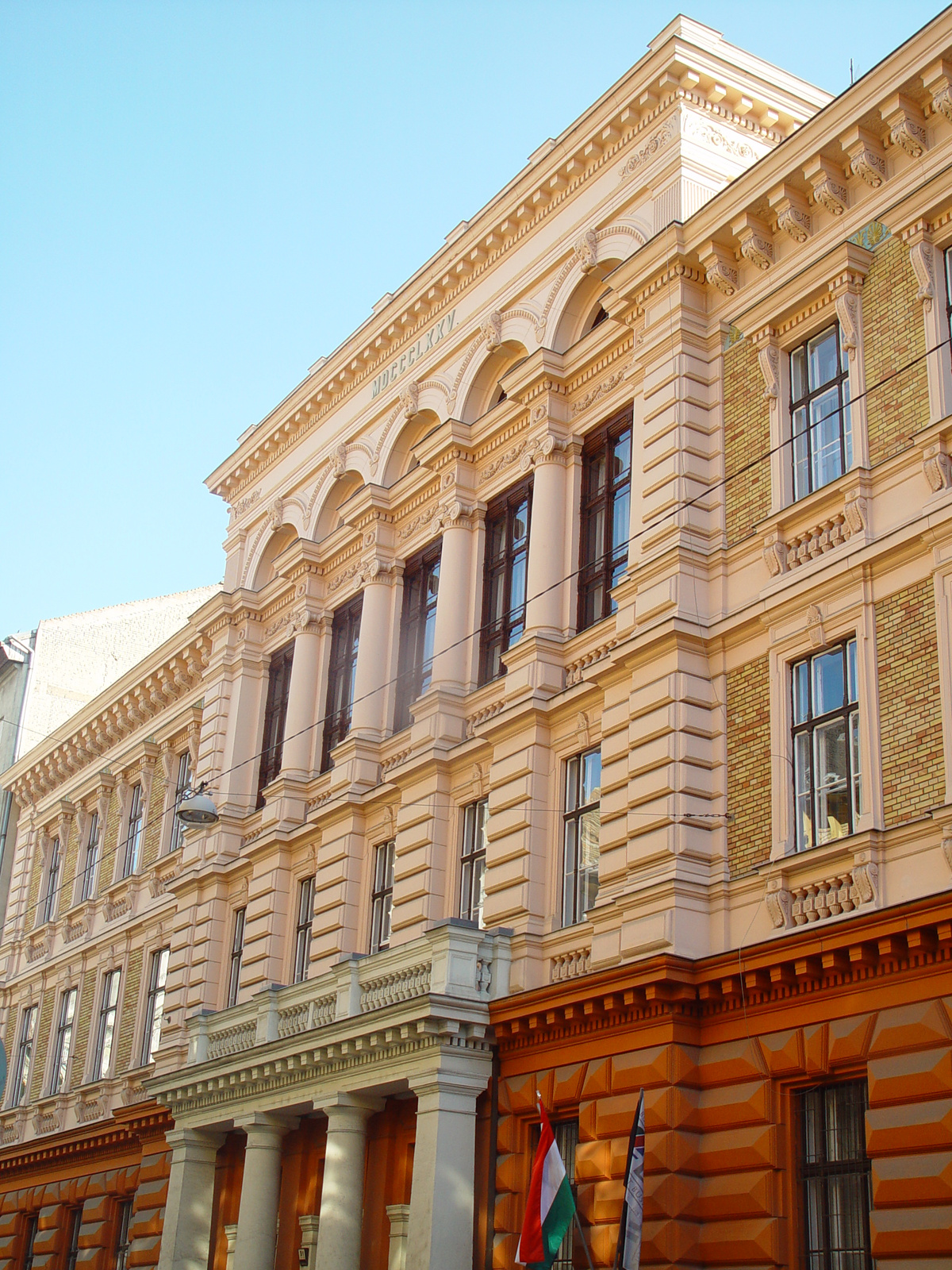
Budapest Business School, the first public business school in the world (1857)

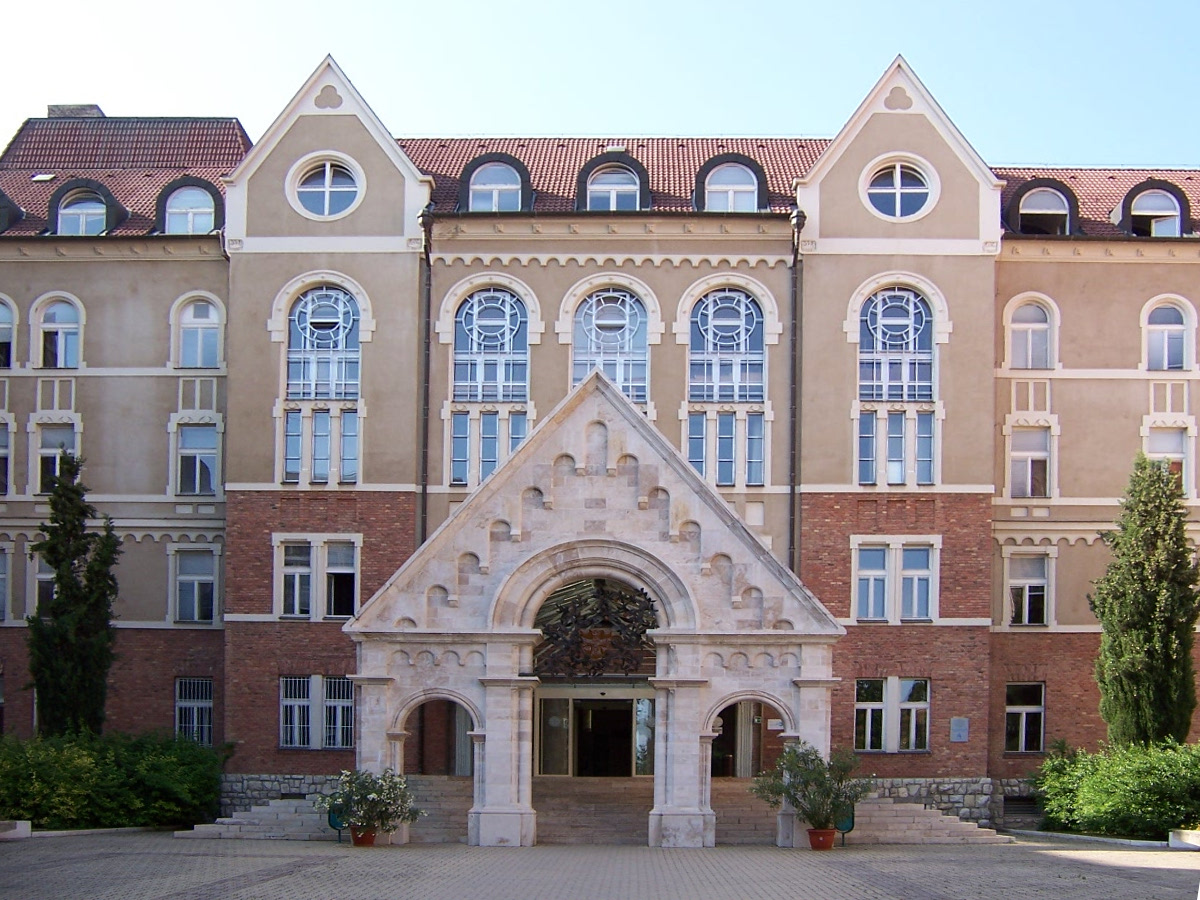
The University of Pécs, founded 1367 by Louis the Great, is the oldest university in Hungary.

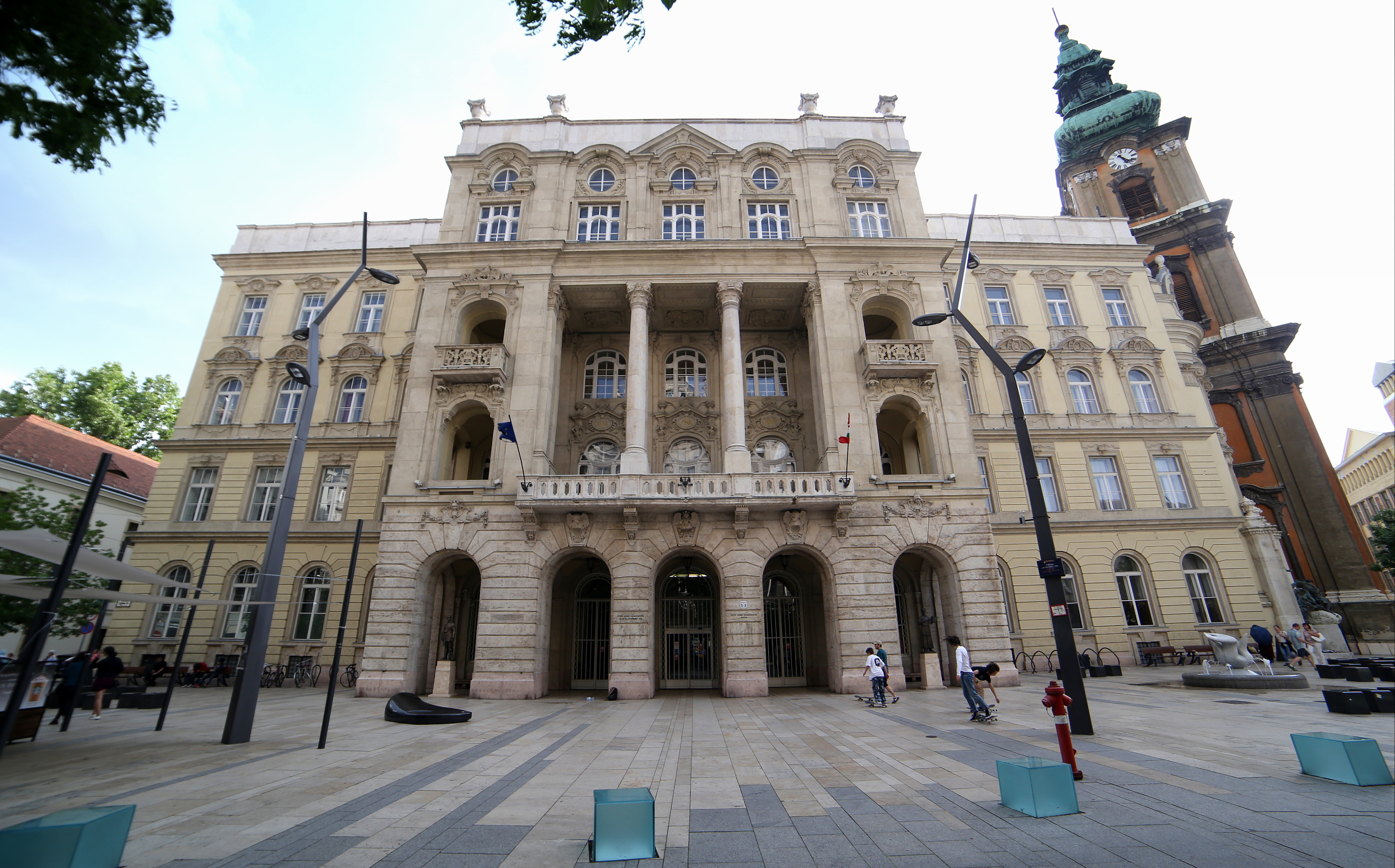
Eötvös Loránd University is one of the largest and most prestigious institutions.

Education is predominantly public, run by the Ministry of Education. Preschool-kindergarten education is compulsory and provided for all children between three and six years old, after which school attendance is also compulsory until the age of sixteen. Primary education usually lasts for eight years. Secondary education includes three traditional types of schools focused on different academic levels: the Gymnasium enrolls the most gifted children and prepares students for university studies; the secondary vocational schools for intermediate students lasts four years and the technical school prepares pupils for vocational education and work. The system is partly flexible and bridges exist. The Trends in International Mathematics and Science Study rated 13–14-year-old pupils in Hungary among the best in the world for maths and science. Hungary ranked slightly above the OECD average in maths and science in the 2022 Programme for International Student Assessment (PISA).

Most of the universities are public institutions, and students traditionally study without fees. The general requirement for university is the Matura. The Hungarian public higher education system includes universities and other higher education institutes that provide both education curricula and related degrees up to doctoral degree and also contribute to research activities. Health insurance for students is free until the end of their studies. English and German language are important in Hungarian higher education; there are a number of degree programmes that are taught in these languages, which attracts thousands of exchange students every year. Hungary's higher education and training has been ranked 44 out of 148 countries in the Global Competitiveness Report 2014.

Hungary has a long tradition of higher education and an established knowledge economy. Several universities are among the oldest in continuous operation in the world, including the University of Pécs (founded 1367), Óbuda University (1395), and Universitas Istropolitana (1465). Nagyszombat University was founded in 1635 and moved to Buda in 1777, and it is called Eötvös Loránd University today. The world's first institute of technology was founded in Selmecbánya in 1735; its legal successor is the University of Miskolc. The Budapest University of Technology and Economics is considered the oldest institute of technology in the world with university rank and structure, its legal predecessor the Institutum Geometrico-Hydrotechnicum was founded in 1782 by Emperor Joseph II.

Hungary ranks fourth (above neighbour Romania, and after China, the United States and Russia) in the all-time medal count at the International Mathematical Olympiad, with 336 total medals since 1959.

=== Health ===
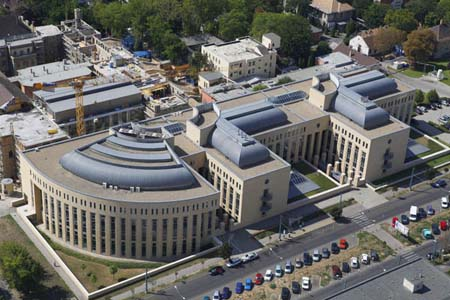
Uzsoki Hospital, Budapest

Hungary maintains a universal health care system largely financed by government national health insurance. According to the OECD, 100% of the population is covered by universal health insurance, which is free for children, students, pensioners, people with low income, handicapped people, and church employees. Hungary spends 7.2% of GDP on healthcare, spending $2,045 per capita, of which $1,365 is provided by the government.

Hungary is one of the main destinations of medical tourism in Europe, particularly for dentistry, in which its share is 42% in Europe and 21% worldwide. Plastic surgery is also a key sector, with 30% of the clients coming from abroad. Hungary is well known for its spa culture and is home to numerous medicinal spas, which attract "spa tourism".

In common with developed countries, cardiovascular disease is a leading cause of mortality, accounting for 49.4% (62,979) of all deaths in 2013. However, this number peaked in 1985 with 79,355 deaths, and has been declining continuously since the fall of communism. The second leading cause of death is cancer with 33,274 (26.2%), which has been stagnant since the 1990s. Deaths from accidents dropped from 8,760 in 1990 to 3,654 in 2013; the number of suicides has declined greatly from 4,911 in 1983 to 2,093 in 2013 (21.1 per 100,000 people), the lowest since 1956. There are considerable health disparities between the western and eastern parts of Hungary; heart disease, hypertension, stroke, and suicide is prevalent in the mostly agricultural and low-income Great Plain region in the east, but infrequent in the high-income, middle class areas of Western Transdanubia and Central Hungary. Smoking is a leading cause of death, although it is in steep decline: The proportion of adult smokers declined to 19% in 2013 from 28% in 2012, owing to strict regulations such as a nationwide smoking ban in every indoor public place and the limiting of tobacco sales to state-controlled "National Tobacco Shops".

== Culture ==
=== Architecture ===
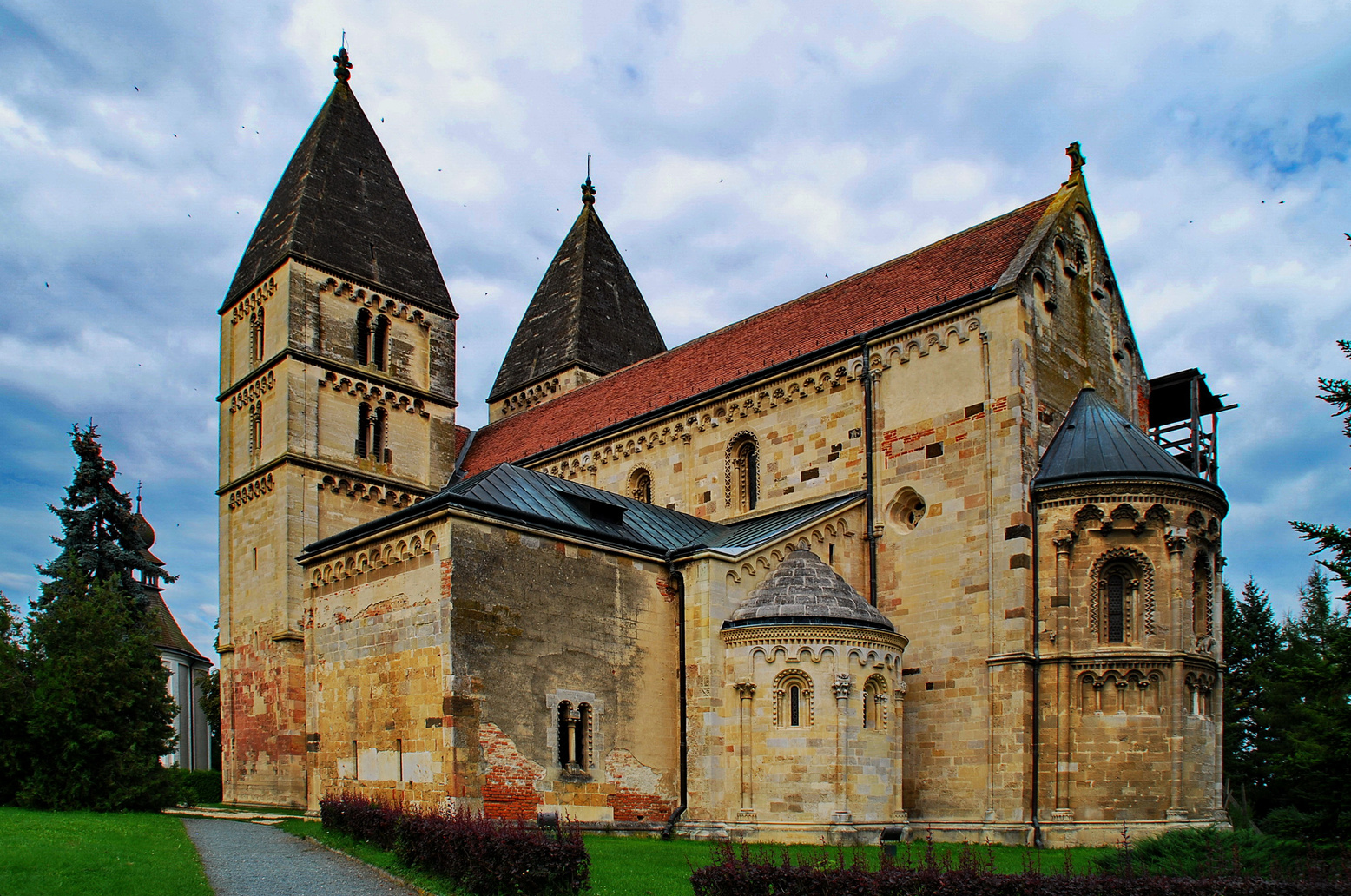
Romanesque Ják Abbey, built between 1220 and 1256

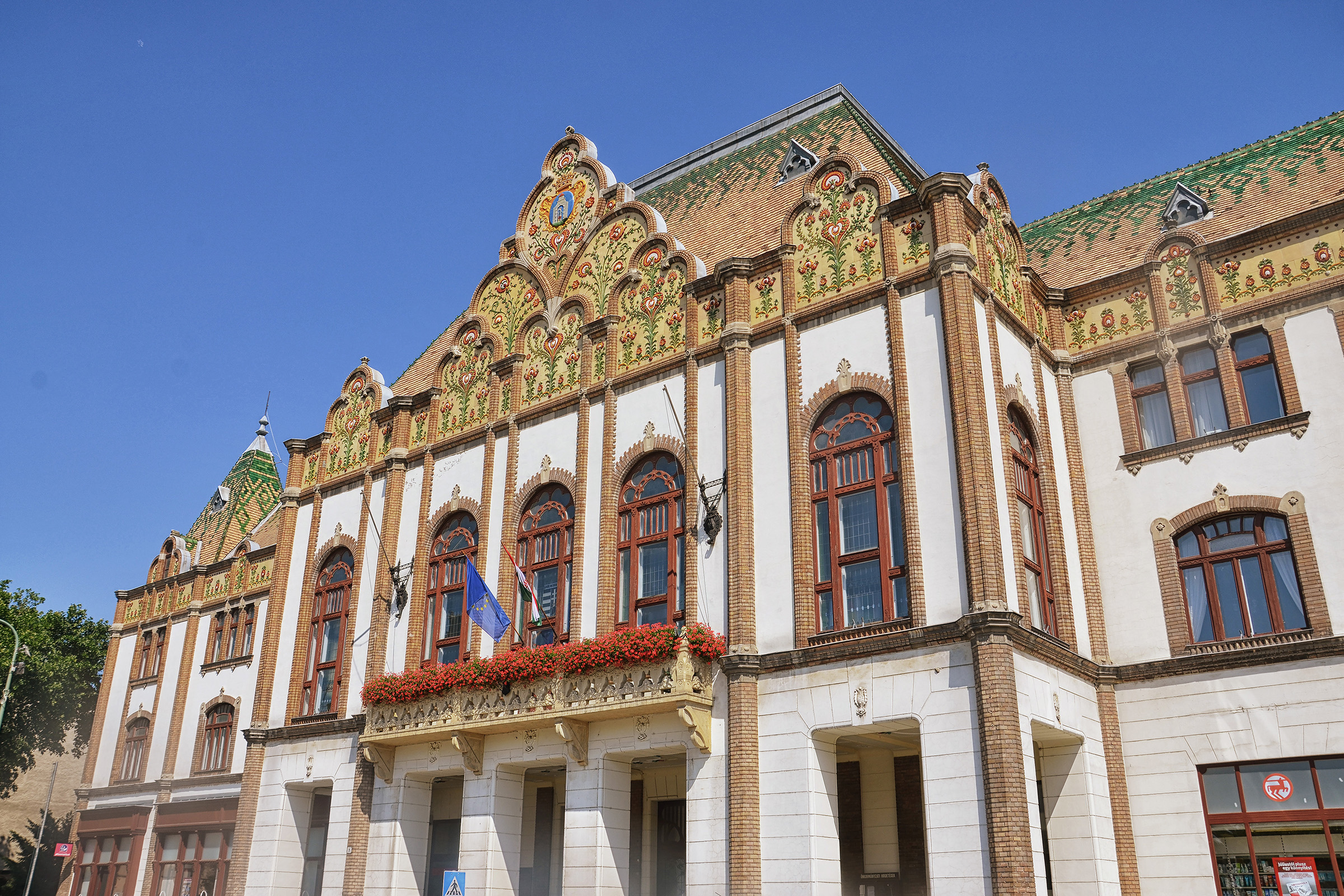
Closeup of the Hungarian Art Nouveau architectural details on the Kiskunfélegyháza Town Hall

Hungary is home to the largest synagogue in Europe, built in 1859 in Moorish Revival style with a capacity of 3,000 people; one of the largest medicinal baths in Europe, completed in 1913 in Modern Renaissance style and located in the Budapest city park; one of the largest basilicas in Europe; the second-largest territorial abbey in the world; and the largest early Christian necropolis outside Italy. Notable architectural styles include Historicism and variants of Art Nouveau. In contrast to Historicism, Hungarian Art Nouveau is based on national architectural characteristics. Taking the eastern origins of the Hungarians into account, Ödön Lechner, the most important figure in Hungarian Art Nouveau, was initially inspired by Asian architecture and later by traditional Hungarian decorative designs. In this way, he created an original synthesis of architectural styles. By applying them to three-dimensional architectural elements, he produced a version of Art Nouveau that was specific to Hungary. Turning away from the style of Lechner, yet taking inspiration from his approach, the group of "Young People" (Fiatalok), which included Károly Kós and Dezsö Zrumeczky, used the characteristic structures and forms of traditional Hungarian architecture to achieve the same end.

Besides the two principal styles, Budapest also displays local versions of trends originating from other European countries. The Sezession from Vienna, the German Jugendstil, Art Nouveau from Belgium and France, and the influence of English and Finnish architecture are all reflected in the buildings constructed at the turn of the 20th century. Béla Lajta initially adopted Lechner's style, subsequently drawing his inspiration from English and Finnish trends; after developing an interest in the Egyptian style, he finally arrived at modern architecture. Aladár Árkay took almost the same route. István Medgyaszay developed his own style, which differed from Lechner's, using stylised traditional motifs to create decorative designs in concrete. In the sphere of applied arts, those chiefly responsible for promoting the spread of Art Nouveau were the School and Museum of Decorative Arts, which opened in 1896.

In the Budapest downtown area almost all the buildings are about one hundred years old, with thick walls, high ceilings, and motifs on the front walls.

=== Music ===
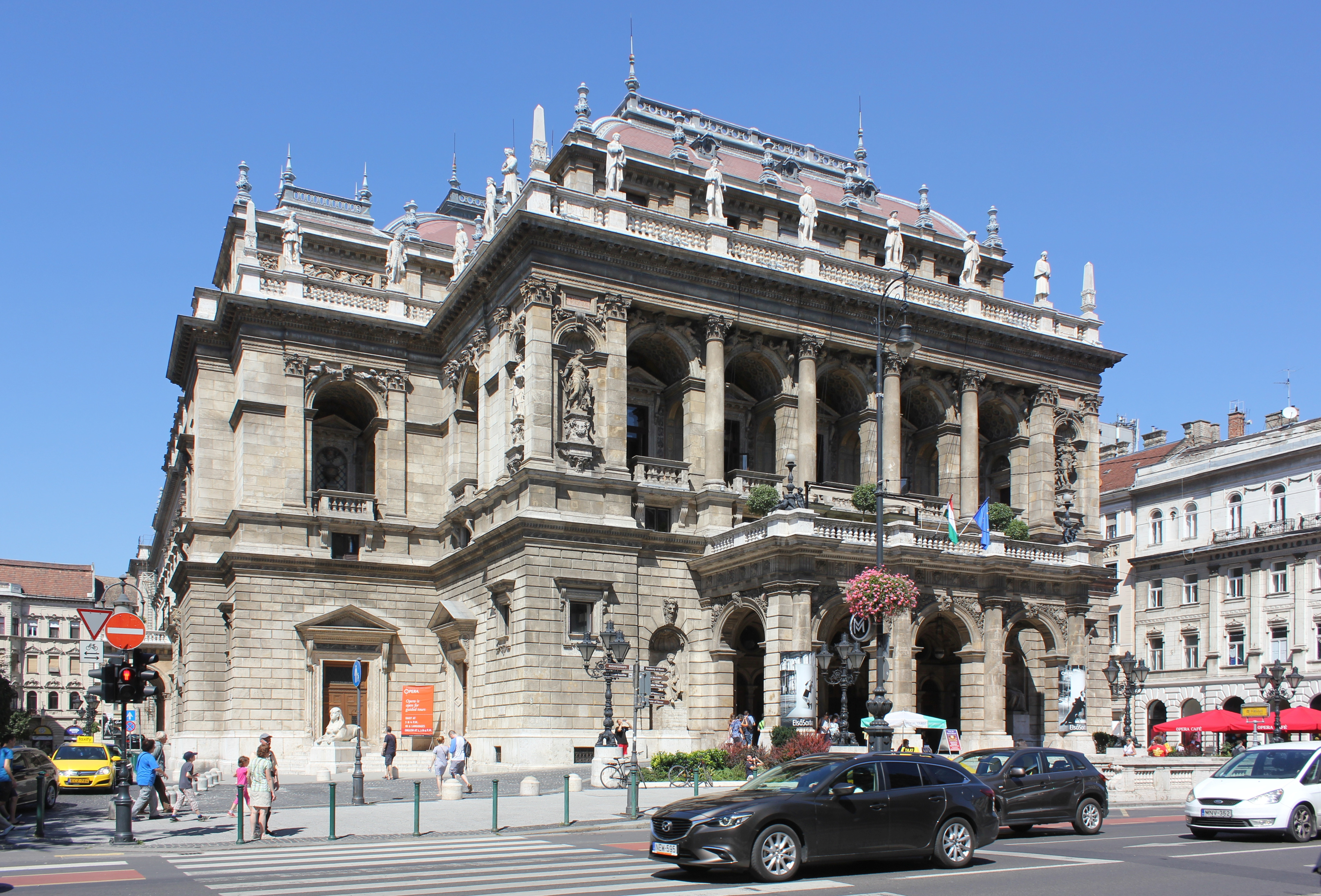
The Hungarian State Opera House on Andrássy út (a World Heritage Site)

Hungarian music consists mainly of traditional Hungarian folk music and music by prominent composers such as Franz Liszt and Béla Bartók, considered to be among the greatest Hungarian composers. Other renowned composers are Ernst von Dohnányi, Franz Schmidt, Zoltán Kodály, Gabriel von Wayditch, Rudolf Wagner-Régeny, László Lajtha, Franz Lehár, Imre Kálmán, Sándor Veress and Miklós Rózsa. Hungarian traditional music tends to have a strong dactylic rhythm, as the language is invariably stressed on the first syllable of each word.

Hungary has renowned composers of contemporary classical music, György Ligeti, György Kurtág, Péter Eötvös, Zoltán Kodály and Zoltán Jeney among them. Bartók was among the most significant musicians of the 20th century. His music was invigorated by the themes, modes, and rhythmic patterns of the Hungarian and neighbouring folk music traditions he studied, which he synthesised with influences from his contemporaries into his own distinctive style. Folk music is a prominent part of the national identity and has been significant in former country parts that belong—since the 1920 Treaty of Trianon—to neighbouring countries such as Romania, Slovakia, Poland, especially in southern Slovakia and Transylvania. After the establishment of a music academy led by Liszt and Ferenc Erkel,

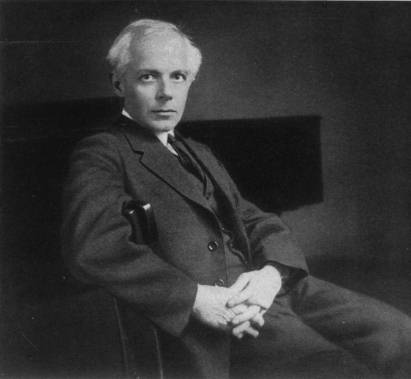
Composer Béla Bartók

Broughton claims that Hungary's "infectious sound has been surprisingly influential on neighboring countries (thanks perhaps to the common Austro-Hungarian history) and it's not uncommon to hear Hungarian-sounding tunes in Romania, Slovakia and Poland". It is also strong in the Szabolcs-Szatmár area and in the southwest part of Transdanubia, near the border with Croatia. The Busójárás carnival in Mohács is a major Hungarian folk music event, formerly featuring the long-established and well-regarded Bogyiszló Orchestra.

Hungarian classical music has long been an "experiment, made from Hungarian antecedents and on Hungarian soil, to create a conscious musical culture [using the] musical world of the folk song". Although the Hungarian upper class has long had cultural and political connections with the rest of Europe, leading to an influx of European musical ideas, the rural peasants maintained their own traditions such that by the end of the 19th-century Hungarian composers could draw on rural peasant music to (re)create a Hungarian classical style. For example, Bartók collected folk songs from across Central and Eastern Europe, including Romania and Slovakia, while Kodály was more interested in creating a distinctively Hungarian musical style.

During the era of communist rule in Hungary, a Song Committee scoured and censored popular music for traces of subversion and ideological impurity. Since then, however, the Hungarian music industry has begun to recover, producing successful performers in the fields of jazz such as trumpeter Rudolf Tomsits, pianist-composer Károly Binder and, in a modernised form of Hungarian folk, Ferenc Sebő and Márta Sebestyén. The three giants of Hungarian rock, Illés, Metró and Omega, remain very popular, especially Omega, which has followings in Germany and beyond as well as in Hungary. Older veteran underground bands such as Beatrice, from the 1980s, also remain popular.

=== Cuisine ===
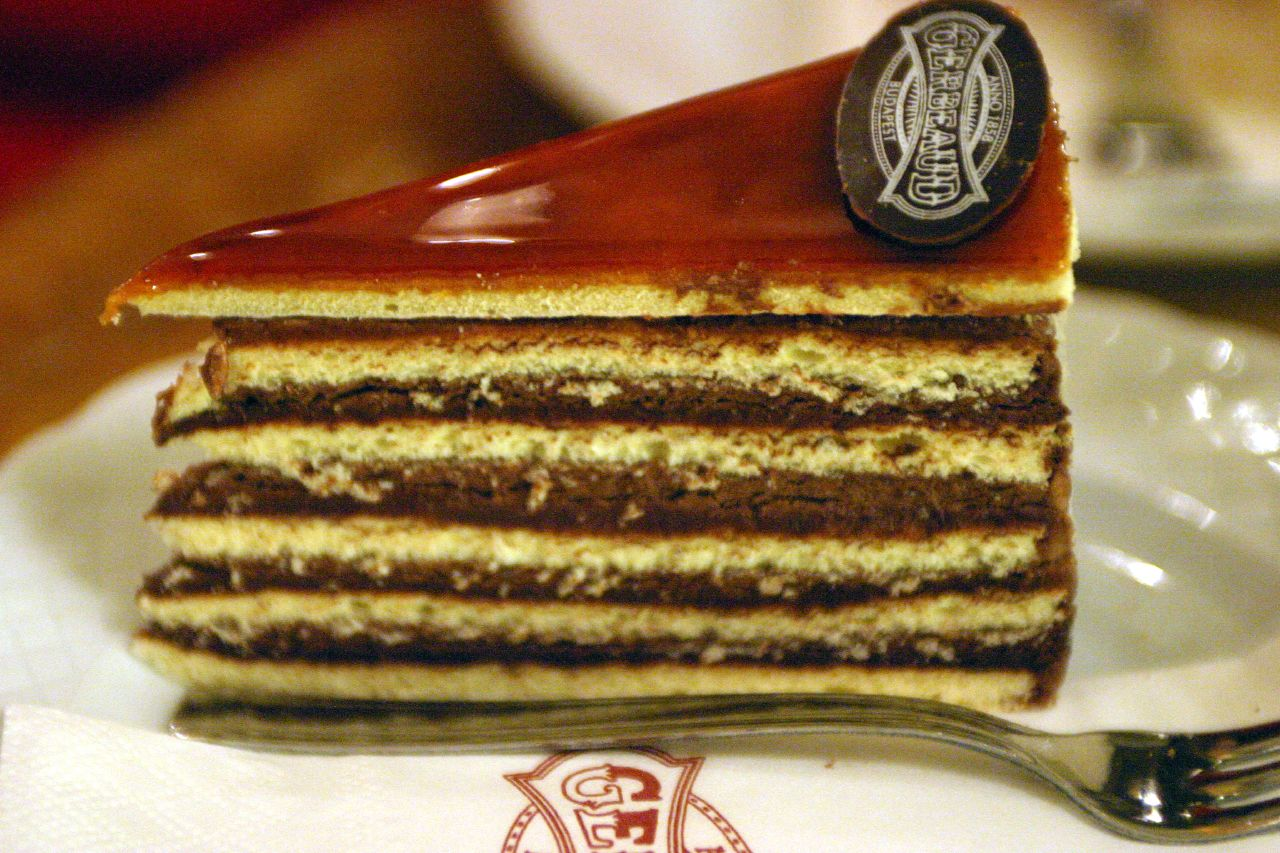
Dobos torte

Traditional dishes such as the world-famous goulash (gulyás stew or gulyás soup) feature prominently in Hungarian cuisine. Dishes are often flavoured with paprika (ground red peppers), a Hungarian innovation. The paprika powder, obtained from a special type of pepper, is one of the most common spices used in typical Hungarian cuisine. Thick, heavy sour cream called tejföl is often used to soften the flavour of a dish. The famous Hungarian hot river fish soup called fisherman's soup or halászlé is usually a rich mixture of several kinds of poached fish.

Other dishes are chicken paprikash, foie gras made of goose liver, pörkölt stew, vadas, (game stew with vegetable gravy and dumplings), trout with almonds and salty and sweet dumplings, like túrós csusza, (dumplings with fresh quark cheese and thick sour cream). Desserts include the iconic Dobos torte, strudels (rétes), filled with apple, cherry, poppy seed or cheese, Gundel pancake, plum dumplings (szilvás gombóc), somlói dumplings, dessert soups like chilled sour cherry soup and sweet chestnut puree, gesztenyepüré (cooked chestnuts mashed with sugar and rum and split into crumbs, topped with whipped cream). Perec and kifli are widely popular pastries.

The csárda is the most distinctive type of Hungarian inn, an old-style tavern offering traditional cuisine and beverages. Borozó usually denotes a cosy old-fashioned wine tavern, pince is a beer or wine cellar and a söröző is a pub offering draught beer and sometimes meals. The bisztró is an inexpensive restaurant often with self-service. The büfé is the cheapest place, although one may have to eat standing at a counter. Pastries, cakes and coffee are served at the confectionery called cukrászda, while an eszpresszó is a café.

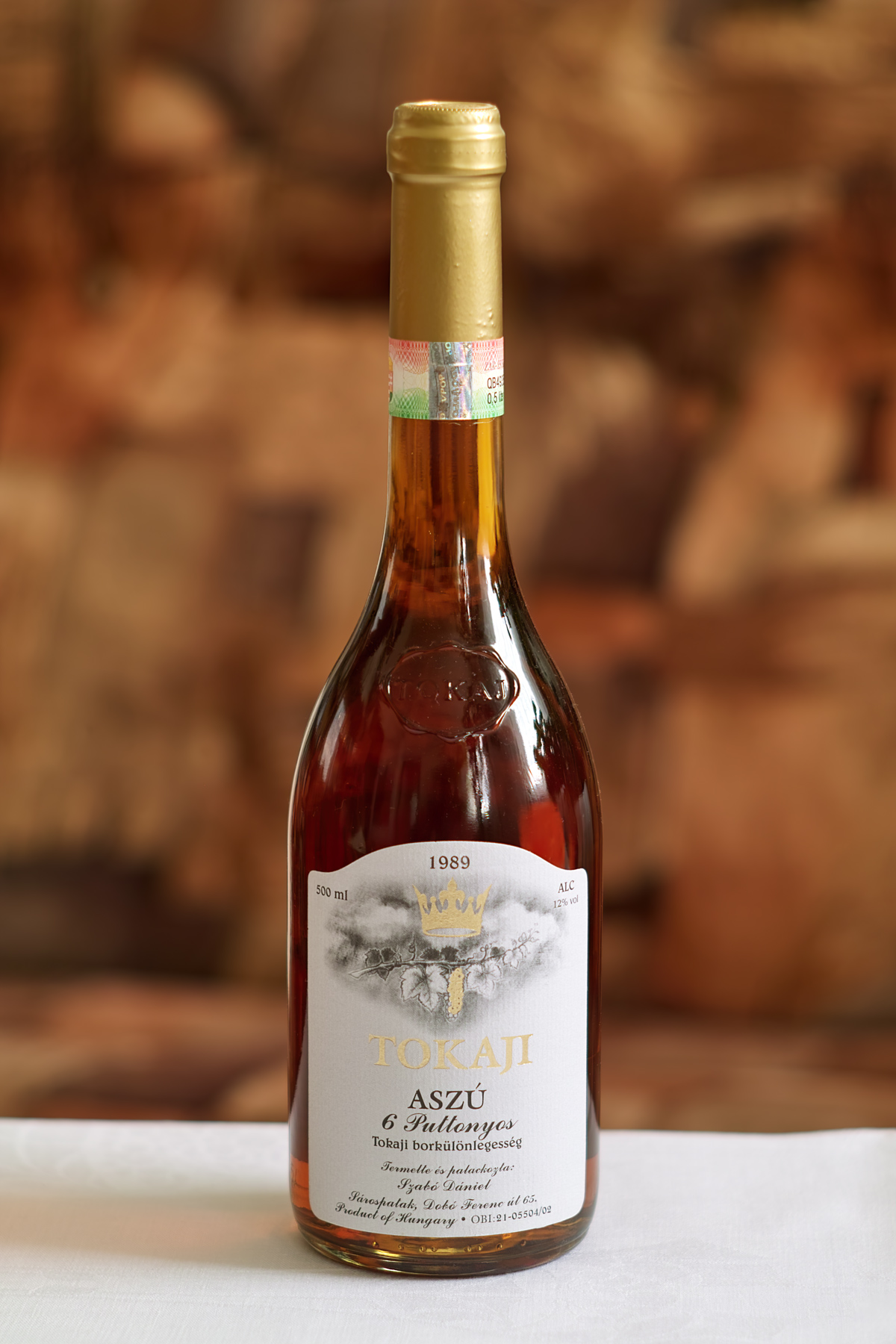
The famous Tokaji wine. It was called Vinum Regum, Rex Vinorum ("Wine of Kings, King of Wines") by Louis XIV of France.

Pálinka is a fruit brandy, distilled from fruit grown in the orchards situated on the Great Hungarian Plain. It is a spirit native to Hungary and comes in a variety of flavours including apricot (barack) and cherry (cseresznye). However, plum (szilva) is the most popular flavour. Beer goes well with many traditional Hungarian dishes. The five main Hungarian beer brands are: Borsodi, Soproni, Arany Ászok, Kõbányai, and Dreher. People traditionally do not clink their glasses or mugs when drinking beer. There is an urban legend in Hungarian culture that Austrian generals clinked their beer glasses to celebrate the execution of the 13 Martyrs of Arad in 1849. Many people still follow the tradition, although younger people often disavow it, citing that the vow was only meant to last 150 years.

Hungary is ideal for wine-making, and the country can be divided into numerous wine-producing regions. The Romans brought vines to Pannonia, and by the 5th century AD, there are records of extensive vineyards in what is now Hungary. The Hungarians brought their wine-making knowledge from the East. According to Ibn Rustah, the Hungarian tribes were familiar with wine-making long before their conquest of the Carpathian Basin. The different wine regions offer a great variety of styles: the main products of the country are elegant and full-bodied dry whites with good acidity, although complex sweet whites (Tokaj), elegant (Eger) and full-bodied robust reds (Villány and Szekszárd) are also produced. The main varieties are Olaszrizling, Hárslevelű, Furmint, Pinot gris or Szürkebarát, Chardonnay (whites), Kékfrankos (or Blaufrankisch in German), Kadarka, Portugieser, Zweigelt, Cabernet Sauvignon, Cabernet Franc and Merlot. The most famous wines from Hungary are Tokaji Aszú and Egri Bikavér. Tokaji wine has received accolades from numerous great writers and composers. For over 150 years, a blend of forty Hungarian herbs has been used to create the liqueur unicum, a bitter, dark-coloured liqueur that can be drunk as an apéritif or after a meal.

=== Sport ===
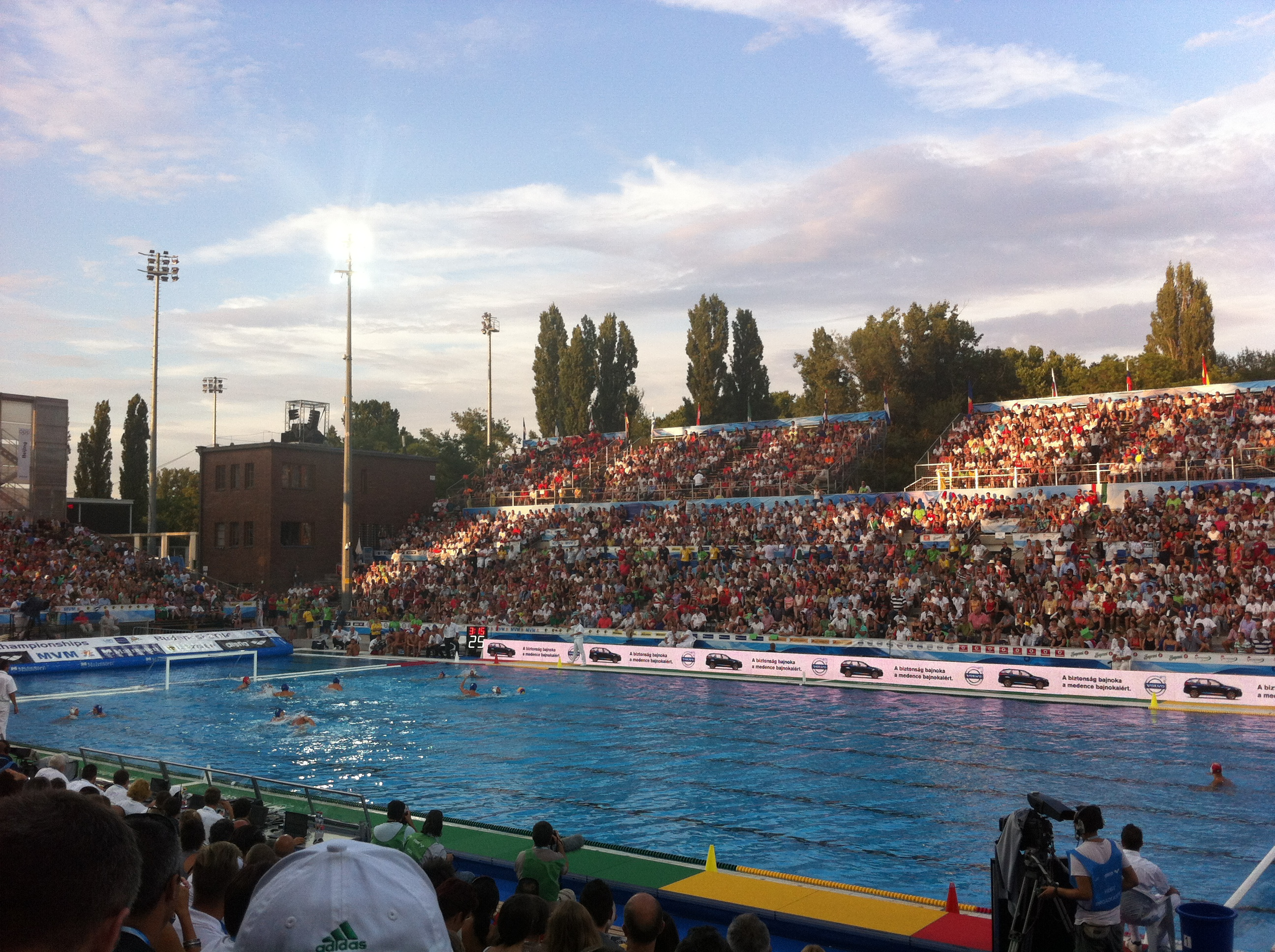
Hungary men's national water polo team is considered among the best in the world, holding the world record for Olympic golds and overall medals.

Hungarian athletes have been successful contenders in the Summer Olympic Games. Hungary ranks 9th with a total of 511 medals in the all-time Summer Olympic Games medal count. Hungary has the third-highest number of Olympic medals per capita and second-highest number of gold medals per capita in the world. Hungary has historically excelled in Olympic water sports. In water polo the men's Hungarian team is the leading medal winner by a significant margin, and in swimming the men's and the women's teams are both rank fifth-most successful. Hungary leads the overall medal count in canoeing and kayaking. Hungary won its first gold medal in Winter Olympics in 2018 in men's short track speed skating with a team of four: Csaba Burján, Shaolin Sándor Liu, Shaoang Liu, and Viktor Knoch.

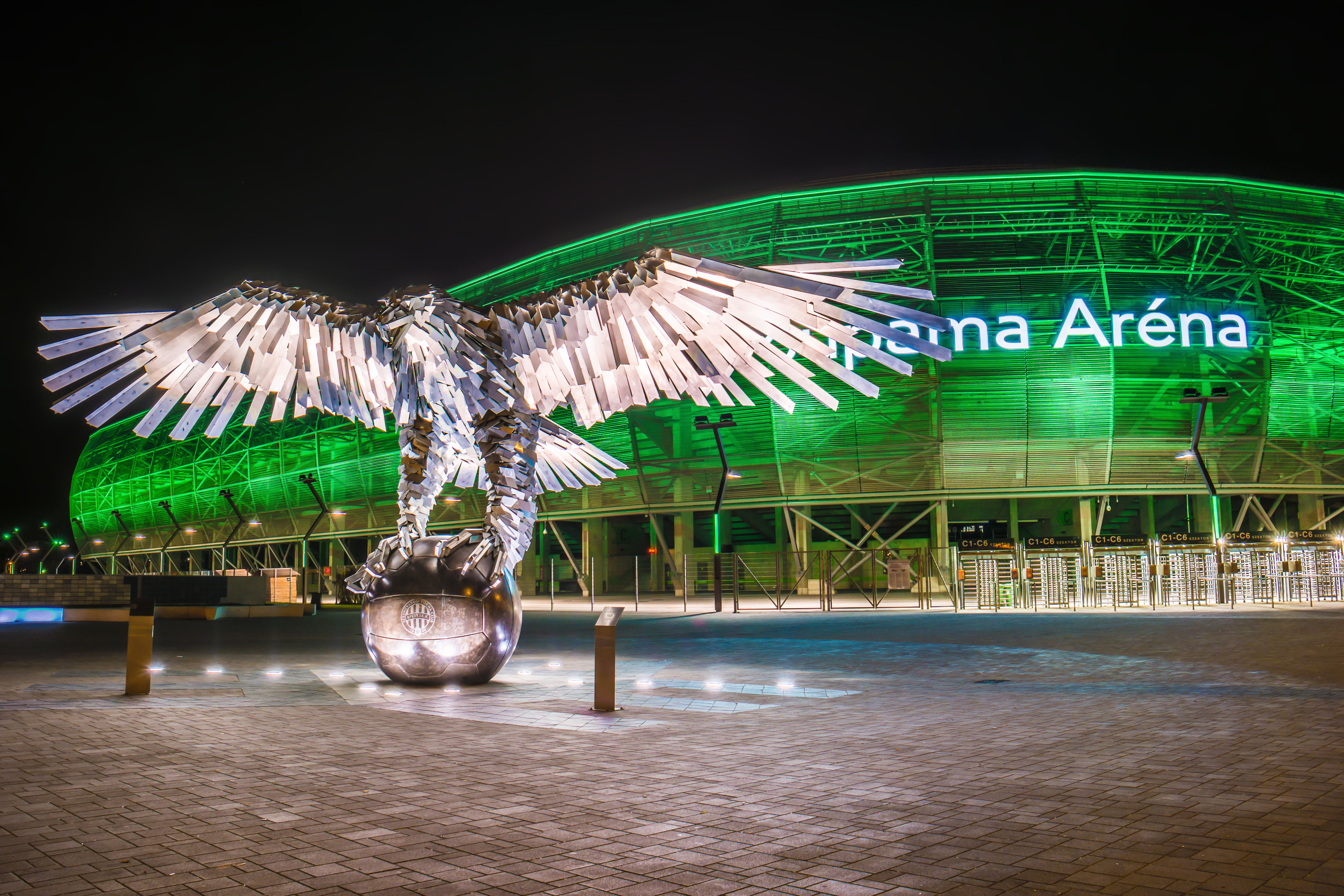
The Groupama Aréna, home of Ferencvárosi TC, a UEFA Category 4 Stadium

Hungary hosted many global sports events, including the 1997 World Amateur Boxing Championships, 2000 World Fencing Championships, 2001 World Allround Speed Skating Championships, 2008 World Interuniversity Games, 2008 World Modern Pentathlon Championships, 2010 ITU World Championship Series, 2011 IIHF World Championship, 2013 World Fencing Championships, 2013 World Wrestling Championships, 2014 World Masters Athletics Championships, 2017 World Aquatics Championships and 2017 World Judo Championships, only in the last two decade. Besides these, Hungary was the home of many European-level tournaments, like 2006 European Aquatics Championships, 2010 European Aquatics Championships, 2013 European Judo Championships, 2013 European Karate Championships, 2017 European Rhythmic Gymnastics Championship and hosted 4 matches in the UEFA Euro 2020, which were held in the 67,889-seat new multi-purpose Puskás Ferenc Stadium. Hungary has won three Olympic football titles. Hungary revolutionised the sport in the 1950s, laying the tactical fundamentals of total football and dominating international football with the Aranycsapat ("Golden Team"), which included Ferenc Puskás, top goal scorer of the 20th century, to whom FIFA dedicated its newest award, the Puskás Award. The team of that era has the second all-time highest Football Elo Rating in the world, with 2166, and one of the longest undefeated runs in football history, remaining unbeaten in 31 games spanning more than four years. The post-golden age decades saw a gradually weakening Hungary, though recently there is renewal in all aspects. The Hungarian Children's Football Federation was founded in 2008, as youth development thrives. They hosted the 2010 UEFA Futsal Championship in Budapest and Debrecen, the first time the MLSZ staged a UEFA finals tournament.

The Hungarian Grand Prix in Formula One has been held at the Hungaroring just outside Budapest, which circuit has FIA Grade 1 licence. Since 1986, the race has been a round of the Formula One World Championship. The track was completely resurfaced for the first time in early 2016, and it was announced the Grand Prix's deal was extended for a further five years, until 2026. Chess is a popular and successful sport, and the Hungarian players are the eighth most powerful overall on the ranking of World Chess Federation. There are about 54 Grandmasters and 118 International Masters, which is more than in France or United Kingdom. Judit Polgár generally considered the strongest female chess player of all time. Some of the world's best sabre athletes have historically also hailed from Hungary, and in 2009, the Hungary men's national ice hockey team qualified for their first IIHF World Championship, in 2015, they qualified for their second world championship in the top division.

== See also ==
- Outline of Hungary
