= Stephen Sanger =

- Born: Stephen W. Sanger; April 10, 1946 (age 80); Cincinnati, Ohio, U.S.
- Education: DePauw University (BA); University of Michigan (MBA)
- Occupation: Business executive
- Employer: General Mills
- Known for: Chairman and CEO of General Mills; Chairman of Wells Fargo
- Title: Former Chairman and Chief Executive Officer of General Mills
- Board member of: Wells Fargo; Target Corporation; Pfizer

Stephen W. Sanger (born April 10, 1946) is a former chairman and chief executive officer of General Mills, former chairman of Wells Fargo, as well as a director of Target Corporation, and Pfizer.

== Early life ==
A native of Cincinnati, Ohio, Sanger received a BA degree in history from DePauw University in 1968 and an MBA degree from the University of Michigan in 1970. He joined Procter & Gamble in the marketing and sales department in Cincinnati.

== Career ==
In 1974, Sanger joined General Mills in marketing, rising to the post of vice president and general manager of Northstar Division in 1983. He was the president of Yoplait USA from 1986 to 1988 and president of Big G Cereal Division from 1988 to 1991. Sanger was named senior vice president of General Mills in 1989 and executive vice president in 1991. He was elected to the board of directors as vice chairman in 1992.

Named president of General Mills in September 1993, he held this post until May 1995 when he became chairman and chief executive officer. Sanger retired as CEO in September 2007 and as chairman in May 2008.

He was a director of Target Corporation and Wells Fargo & Company, and formerly served on the boards of Dayton Hudson Corporation, Donaldson Company, Grocery Manufacturers of America, and Minnesota Business Partnership. Sanger is a board member of Catalyst, the Guthrie Theatre, and the National Campaign to Prevent Teen Pregnancy, and a member of the Business Council and the US Advisory Committee for Trade Policy and Negotiations.

== Politics ==
In the political realm, he has been a member of Bush-Cheney 2000 and Bush-Cheney '04.

== Controversy ==
Journalist Michael Moss, in the New York Times and the book “Salt Sugar Fat: How the Food Giants Hooked Us,” criticized Sanger for refusing to change the policies of General Mills due to health concerns.

He was elected Chairman of Wells Fargo’s Board of Directors in October 2016. On 15 August 2017, he announced that he was retiring and will step down in 2018 amid a company scandal.
