= Túró Rudi =

Curd snack popular in Hungary

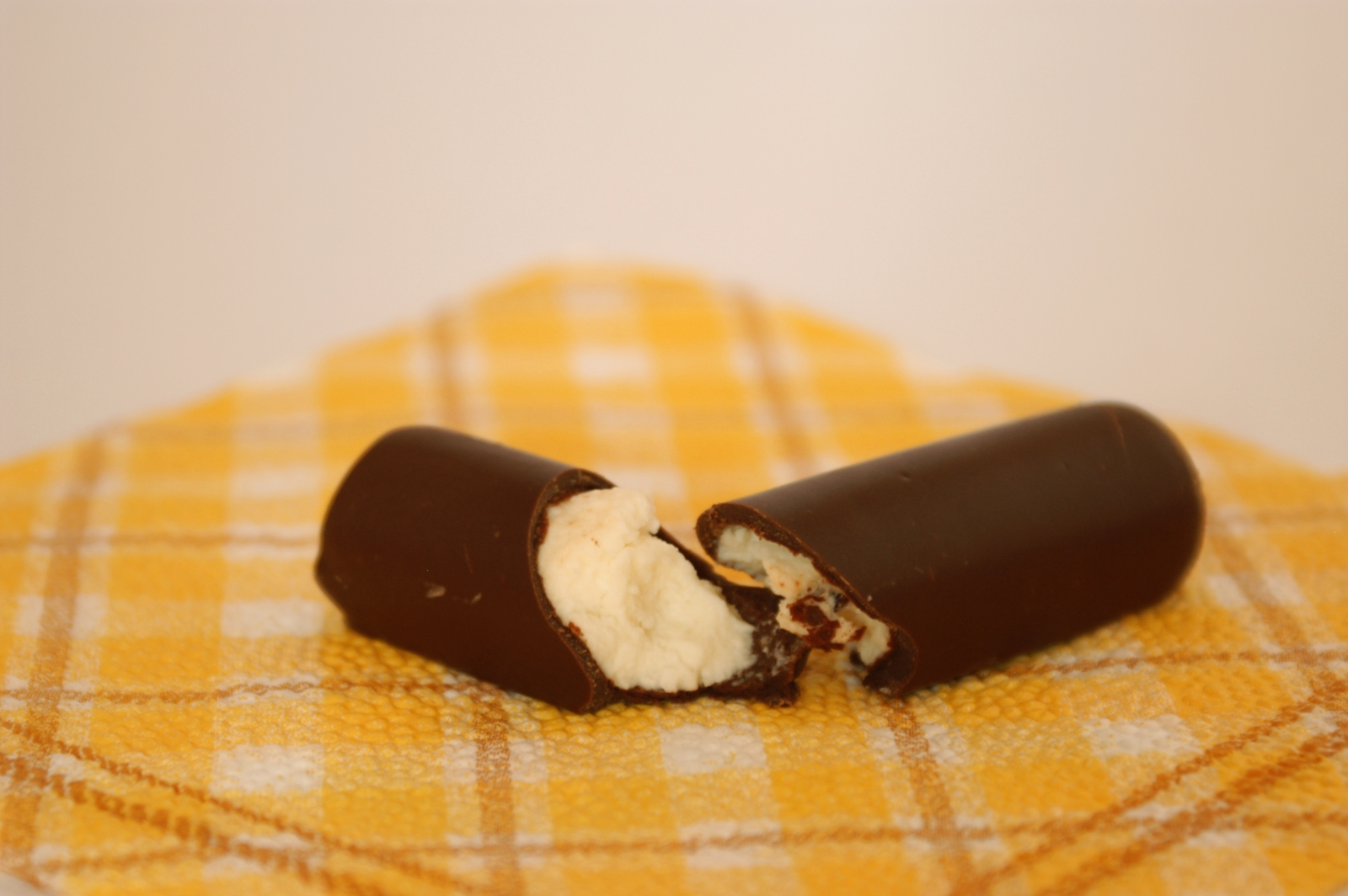
A Túró Rudi broken into two

Túró Rudi (Hungarian pronunciation: [ˈtuːroː ˈrudi]) is the name of a curd snack which has been popular in Hungary since 1968. The bar is composed of a thin chocolate-flavored outer coating and an inner filling of túró (curd). The "Rudi" in the product name comes from the Hungarian rúd, which translates to rod or bar (and is also a nickname for the name "Rudolf"). Túró Rudi can be made in several different flavours and sizes.

The basic (plain, natúr) bar is cheaper and more popular and comes in two sizes: the classic 30-gram (1.1 oz) bar and the large (óriás, "giant") 51 g (1.8 oz) bar. There are differently-flavoured varieties of the bar, like apricot, strawberry and raspberry as jams in the túró, but coconut and vanilla are flavorings. Nut and caramel flavours are also available. The plain bar can be found with both a dark chocolate and a milk chocolate outer coating.

The pöttyös (spotty or spotted with polka dots) theme is part of the marketing scheme of the bar, and the distinctive red polka-dots are readily associated with Túró Rudi by regular consumers. Friesland Hungária, Inc. (which claims to be the manufacturer of the "original" Túró Rudi) released its product in Slovakia, Romania, Spain and Italy under the name DOTS in 2003. The version sold in Western Europe is said to be sweeter and comes with a milk-chocolate coating to suit the taste of locals.

Its first public appearance was in a Hungarian family film, Kismaszat és a Gézengúzok (roughly translated to Little Smear and the Rascals) in the 1980s.

== Origin ==
The earliest form of Túró Rudi appeared in Russia under the name Cырок (Syrok meaning syr-cheese curd snack), a rectangular bar of curd, butter and fat mixed together, covered with dark chocolate coating. Its coating is thinner and the filling is sweeter. It is widely acknowledged that Túró Rudi was based on it, as design and production began after a study trip to the Soviet Union (presumably by Antal Deák). Sándor Klein, a teacher at the Budapest University of Technology, gave the product its name, which raised a bit of controversy as people thought the name was vulgar and had pornographic associations due to the fact that Rudi translates to bar or rod in Hungarian. Regardless, the name stayed, and throughout the 1970s the candy proved both popular and successful. Production moved from Budapest to Mátészalka and eventually grew to several additional factories throughout the 1980s.

== Different versions ==
The original Túró Rudi has gone through many changes during the years, and many different manufacturer has its own Túró Rudi product. Opinions on which of them is the best usually vary a lot. Although the brand name is legally owned by Pöttyös, a few manufacturers claim that their product is much closer to the "original" Túró Rudi, mainly because it contains real túró (curd) and other unspecified "dairy products" or pickled vegetable fats.

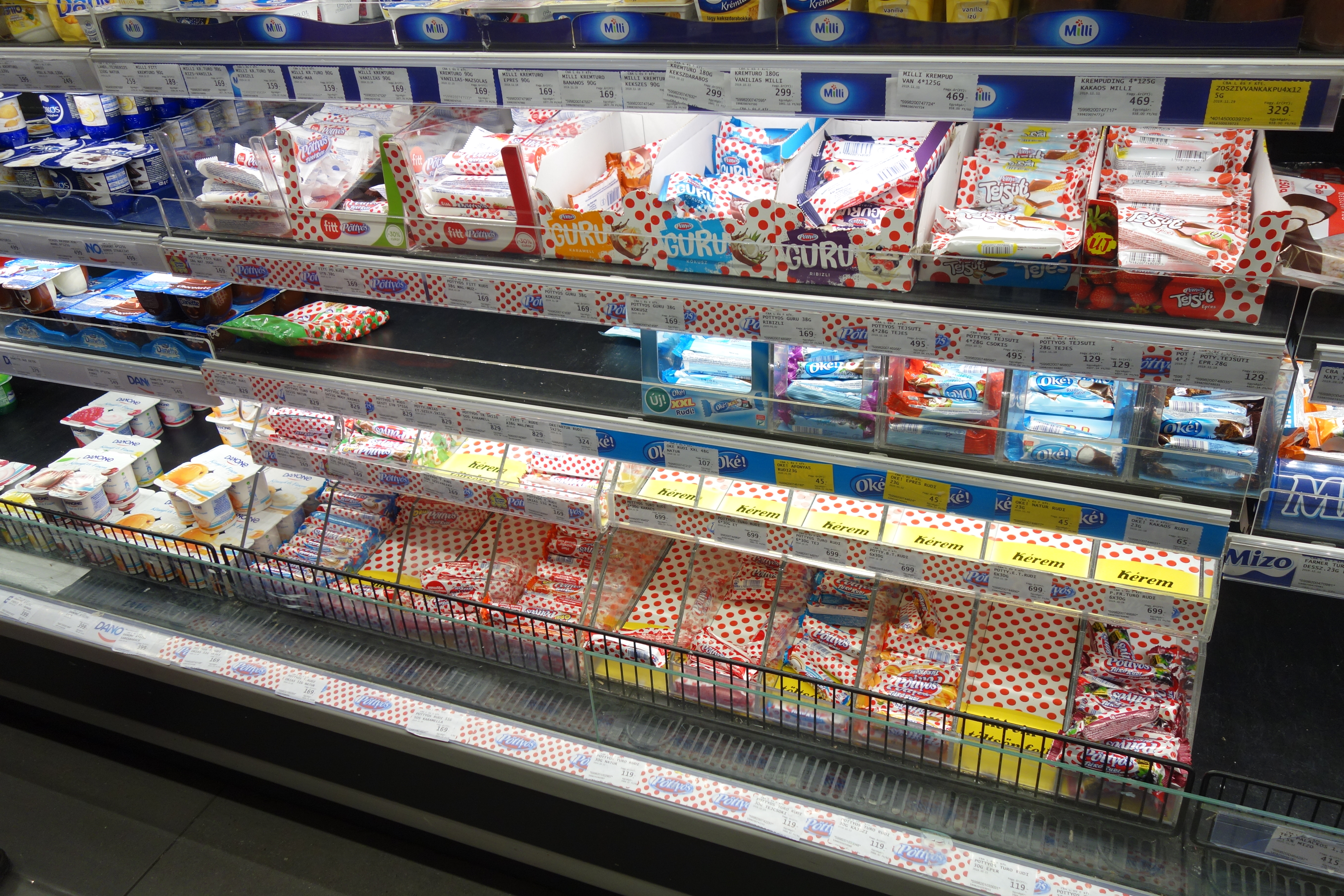
Different variants of Túró Rudi displayed in a Hungarian grocery store.

== Health controversy ==
From the beginning of its production, Túró Rudi was marketed as a "healthy dessert", an opinion strongly supported by nutritional experts of the time. Later examinations however showed some less positive results. While the filling of several (but not all) Túró Rudi has genuine, good quality curd; the coating is not chocolate as many believe. It is a mixture of cocoa powder, hydrogenated vegetable fat, sugar and butter, containing several grams (0.2–0.3 oz) of trans fat which is believed to be one of the main causes of obesity and cardiovascular diseases.

== International versions ==
=== Austria ===
The Austrian company Landfrisch has also started selling its version of the bar, admittedly copied from the original Túró Rudi, under the name Landfrisch Rudi.

The 'Landfrisch Rudi' is also coated with chocolate, like its Hungarian predecessor, and in addition to the 'plain' version, it's also sold in vanilla and coconut flavors.

=== China ===
In China, a copy of the product has been sold since October 2008 under the name Túró Kiittyy (Image).

=== Poland ===
In Poland, Danone is distributing the product originally known as Danone Túró Rudi under the trademark Danio Batonik.
