= Quark (dairy product) =

Acid-set cheese

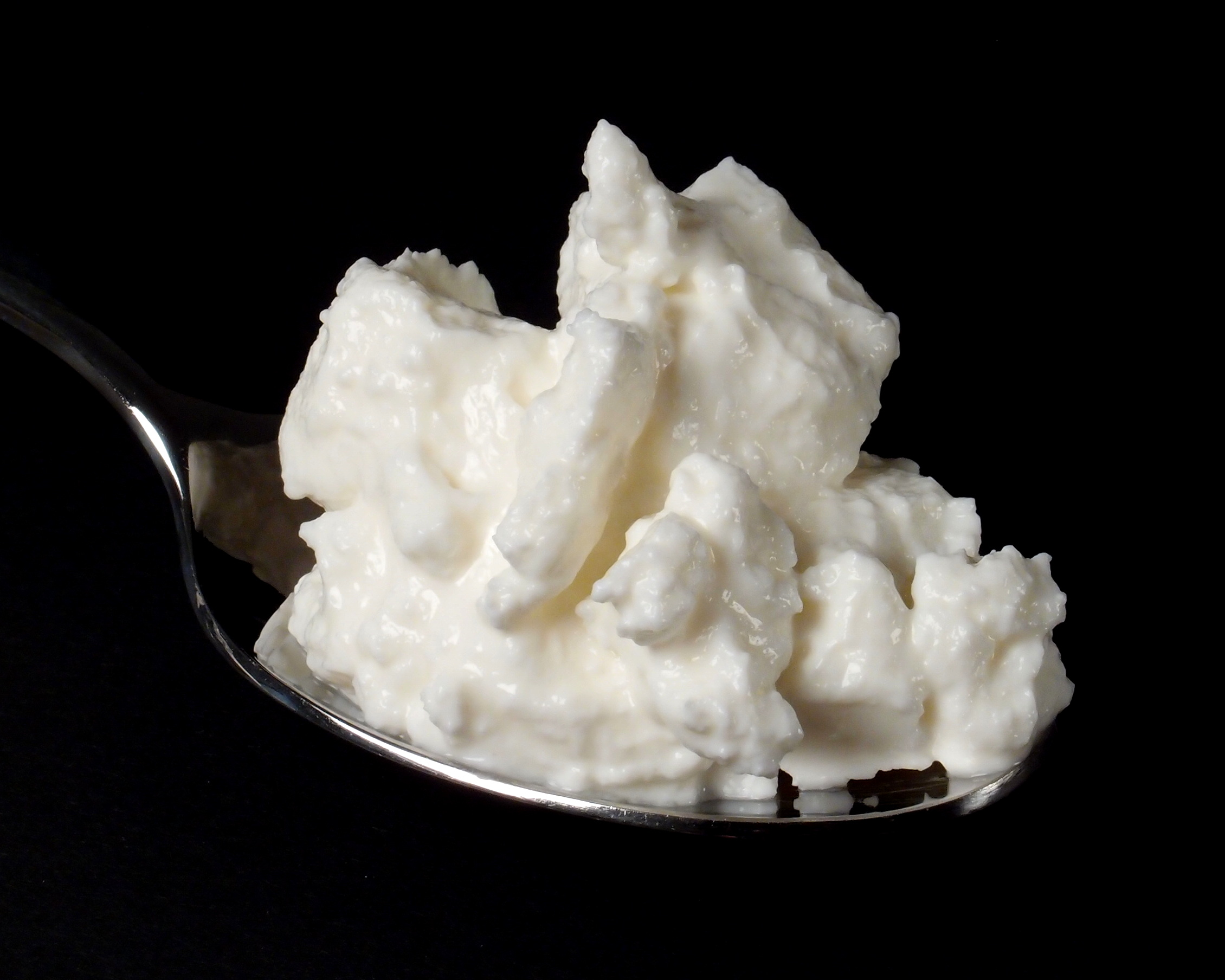
German skimmed milk quark with creamy texture

Quark or quarg (sometimes translated as curd cheese) is a type of fresh dairy product made from milk. The milk is soured, usually by adding lactic acid bacteria cultures, and strained once the desired curdling is achieved. It can be classified as fresh acid-set cheese. Traditional quark can be made without rennet, but in modern dairies small quantities of rennet are typically added. It is soft, white and unaged, and usually has no salt added.

Quark and its drier variant tvorog are traditional in various European cuisines. Quark is similar to other fresh cheeses including the French fromage blanc, cottage cheese, and farmer cheese.

== Name ==
Quark is possibly described by Tacitus in his book Germania as lac concretum ("thick milk"), eaten by Germanic peoples. However, this could also have meant soured milk or another kind of fresh cheese or fermented milk product.

=== Etymology ===
The word Quark (Late Middle High German: quarc, twarc, zwarg; Lower Saxon: dwarg), with usage in German documented since the 14th century, is thought to derive from a West Slavic equivalent, such as Lower Sorbian twarog, Upper Sorbian twaroh, Polish twaróg, Czech and Slovak tvaroh. The word is also cognate with Russian творог (tvorog) and Belarusian тварог (tvaroh).

The original Old Church Slavonic тварогъ (tvarogъ) is supposed to be related to the Church Slavonic творъ, tvor, meaning "form". The meaning can thus be interpreted as "milk that solidified and took a form". The word formation is thus similar to that of the Italian formaggio and French fromage.

==== More cognates and forms ====
The Slavic words may also be cognate with the Greek name for cheese, τῡρός (tūrós). A cognate term for quark, túró, is used in Hungarian. Cognates also occur in Scandinavia (Danish kvark, Norwegian and Swedish kvarg) and the Netherlands (Dutch kwark). The Old English form is geþweor.

Other German forms include Quarck, and Qua^{e}rgel (Quärgel).

In Polish, quark (twaróg) is also known as white cheese, to which the antonym is yellow cheese meaning cheese.

== Relationship to other cheeses ==
Quark is a type of fresh cheese. It is therefore similar in taste and texture to other fresh cheeses, including cottage cheese, farmer cheese, and the French fromage blanc, but distinct from Italian ricotta because ricotta (Italian "recooked") is made from scalded whey. It is particularly closely related to tvorog, a fresh cheese popular in Eastern, Central and (less often) Northern Europe. In Israel, gevina levana denotes a creamy variety of cheese similar to quark. Quark is considered a "white cheese", as opposed to any rennet-set "yellow cheese".

Although quark is sometimes referred to loosely as a type of "cottage cheese", they can be distinguished by the different production aspects and textural quality, with the cottage cheese grains described as more chewy or meaty.

As a fresh cheese, quark is also somewhat similar to yogurt cheeses, such as the South Asian chak(k)a, the Arabic labneh, and the Central Asian suzma or Persian kashk, but while these products are obtained by straining yogurt (milk fermented with thermophile bacteria), quark is made from soured milk fermented with mesophile bacteria.

== Production ==
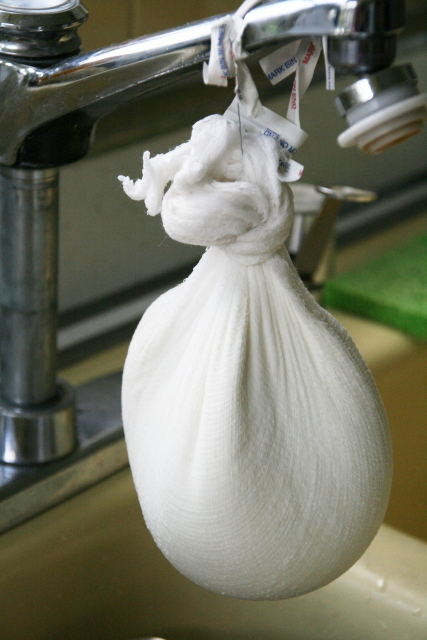
Traditional preparation of quark in a cheesecloth

Quark is a member of the acid-set cheese group, whose coagulation mainly relies on the acidity produced by lactic acid bacteria feeding on the lactose. (Note: This group is distinguished from the "rennet cheeses", whose coagulation relies primarily on the action of rennet, in Fox's classification scheme (1993).) But moderate amounts of rennet have also been in use, both at the home consumption level and the industrial level.

Manufacture of quark normally uses pasteurized skim milk as the main ingredient, but cream can be added later to adjust fat content. The lactic acid bacteria are introduced in the form of mesophilic Lactococcus starter cultures. In the dairy industry today, quark is mostly produced with a small quantity of rennet, added after the culture when the solution is still only slightly acidic (ph 6.1). The solution will then continue to acidify, allowed to reach an approximate pH of 4.6. At this point, the acidity causes the casein proteins in the milk to begin precipitating.

In Germany, it is continuously stirred to prevent hardening, resulting in a thick, creamy texture. According to German regulations on cheese (Käseverordnung), "fresh cheeses" (Frischkäse) such as quark or cottage cheese must contain at least 73% water in the fat-free component. German quark is usually sold in plastic tubs. This type of quark has the firmness of sour cream but is slightly drier, resulting in a somewhat crumbly texture (like ricotta).

Basic quark contains about 0.2% fat; this basic quark or skimmed quark (Magerquark) must under German law have less than 10% fat by dry mass. Quark with higher fat content is made by adding cream after cooling. It has a smooth and creamy texture, and is slightly sweet (unlike sour cream). A firmer version called Schichtkäse (layer cheese) is often used for baking. Schichtkäse is distinguished from quark by having an added layer of cream sandwiched between two layers of quark. In general, the dry mass of quark has 1% to 40% fat; most of the rest is protein (80% of which is casein), calcium, and phosphate.

Quark may be flavored with herbs, spices, or fruit. In Germany and the United Kingdom, prepackaged flavoured quark is commonly sold as a dessert, usually marketed as fruit quark, or Fruchtquark in German (literally "fruit quark"). It typically contains quark, sugar, and fruit or fruit extracts, similar to flavoured yoghurt.

In the 19th century, there was no industrial production of quark (as an end product) and it was produced entirely for home use. In the traditional home-made process, the milk would be allowed to let stand until it soured naturally by the presence of naturally occurring bacteria, although the hardening could be encouraged with the addition of some rennet.

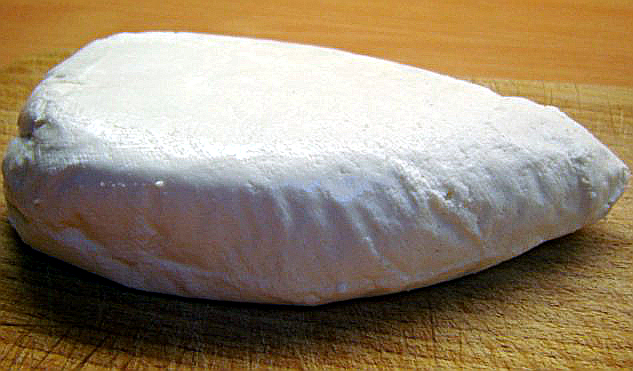
Polish twaróg in the traditional wedge shape

Some or most of the whey is removed to standardize the quark to the desired thickness. Traditionally, this is done by hanging the cheese in a muslin bag or a loosely woven cotton gauze called cheesecloth and letting the whey drip off, which gives quark its distinctive shape of a wedge with rounded edges. In industrial production, however, cheese is separated from whey in a centrifuge and later formed into blocks.

Variations in quark preparation occur across different regions of Germany and Austria. Most of the Austrian and other Central and Eastern European varieties contain less whey and are therefore drier and more solid than the German and Scandinavian ones.

In the Netherlands, many products labelled "kwark" are not based on quark as described in this article (fresh acid-set cheese), but instead a thick yogurt-like product made using yogurt bacteria (such as Streptococcus thermophilus and Lactobacillus acidophilus) in a quicker process using a centrifuge.

Under Russian governmental regulations, tvorog is distinguished from cheeses, and classified as a separate type of dairy product. Typical tvorog usually contain 65–80% water out of the total mass.

== Common uses ==
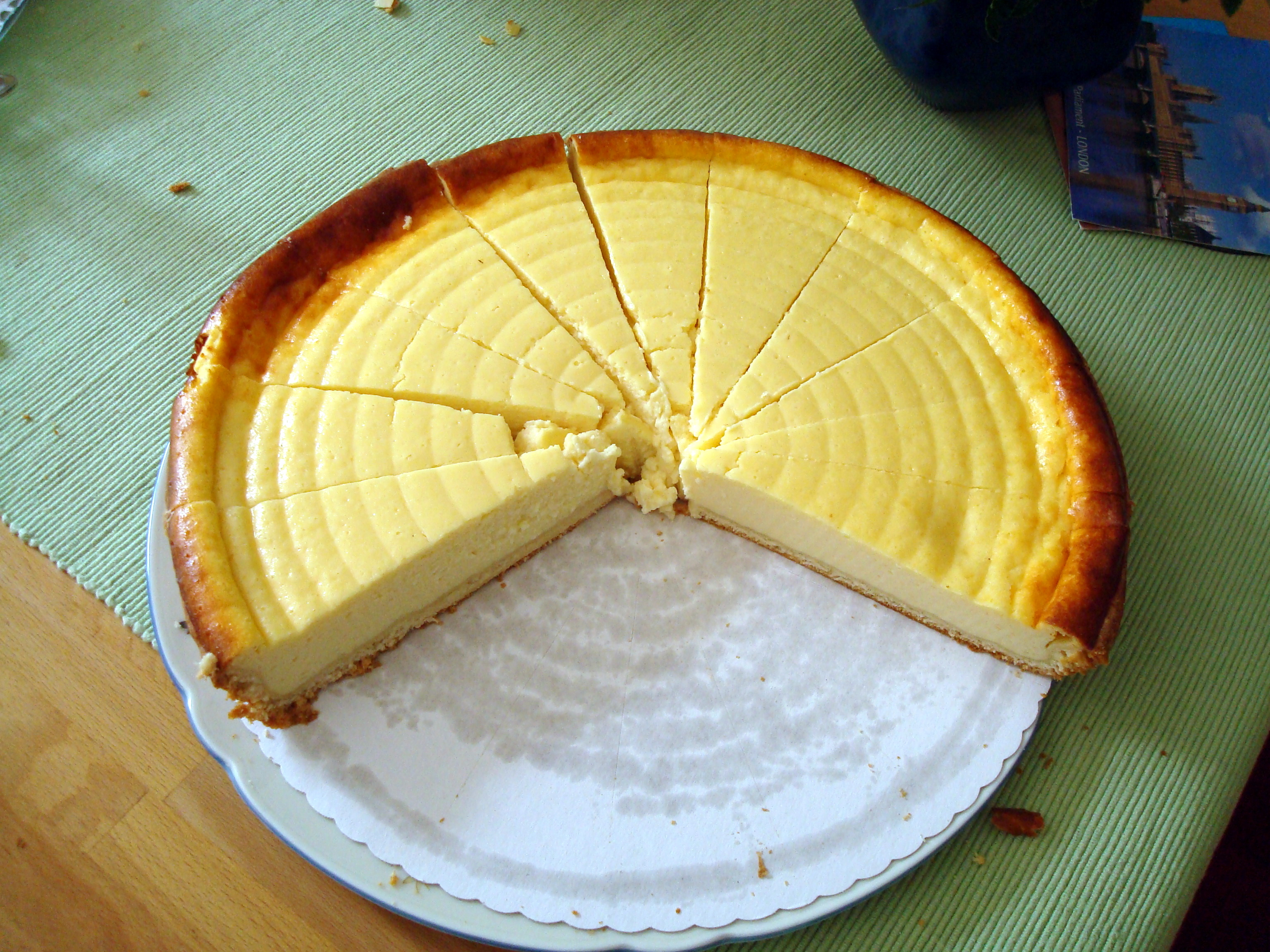
German Käsekuchen made with quark

Various cuisines feature quark as an ingredient for appetizers, salads, main dishes, side dishes, and desserts.

In Germany, quark is sold in cubic plastic tubs and usually comes in three different varieties, Magerquark (skimmed quark, <10% fat by dry mass.), "regular" quark (20% fat in dry mass (Note: 20% FDM is also referred to as "half fat".)) and Sahnequark ("creamy quark", 40% fat in dry mass (Note: 40% FDM is also referred to as "full fat".)) with added cream. Similar gradations in fat content are also common in Eastern Europe.

While Magerquark is often used for baking or is eaten as breakfast with a side of fruit or muesli, Sahnequark also forms the basis of a large number of quark desserts (called Quarkspeise when homemade or Quarkdessert when sold in German).

Much like yoghurts in some parts of the world, these foods mostly come with fruit flavoring (Früchtequark, fruit quark), sometimes with vanilla and are often also simply referred to as quark.

=== Dishes in Germanic-speaking areas ===
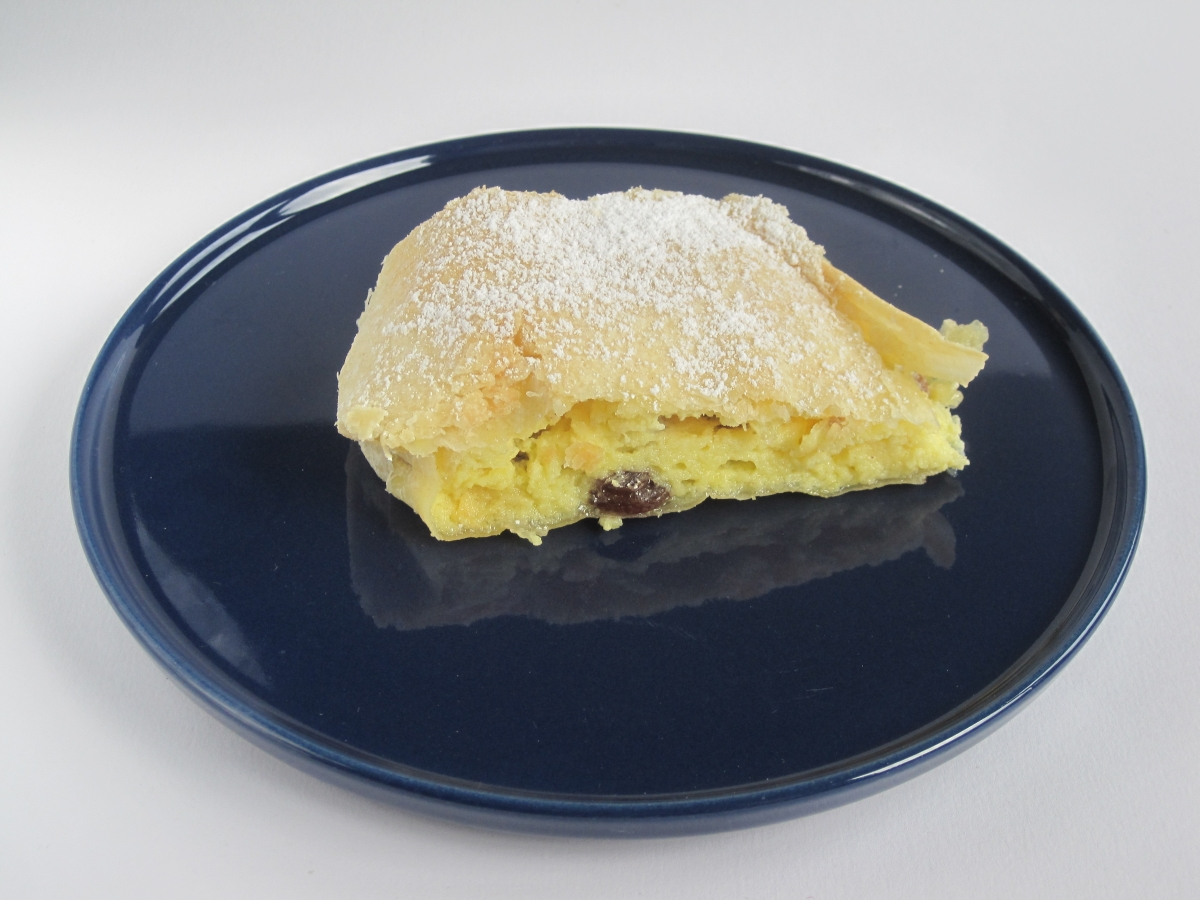
Topfenstrudel or Quarkstrudel contains a filling of topfen and raisins.

One common use for quark is in making cheesecake called Käsekuchen or Quarkkuchen in Germany. Quark cheesecake is called Topfenkuchen in Austria. The Quarktorte in Switzerland may be equivalent, though this has also been described as a torte that combines quark and cream. (Note: A quark pie in German Switzerland is a cream cheese pie in Germany because cream cheese is a sweet cream made of quark and whipped cream; "Was in der deutschen Schweiz eine Quarktorte, ist in Deutschland eine Käsesahnetorte, denn Käsesahne ist eine süsse Creme aus Quark und Sahne.")

In neighboring Netherlands there is a different variant; these cakes, called kwarktaart in Dutch, usually have a cookie crumb crust, and the quark is typically mixed with whipped cream, gelatine, and sugar. These cakes do not require baking or frying, but instead are placed in the refrigerator to firm up. They may be made with quark or with the yogurt-like quark that is common in the Netherlands (see above).

In Austria, Topfen is commonly used in baking for desserts like above-mentioned Topfenkuchen, Topfenstrudel and Topfen-Palatschinken (Topfen-filled crèpes).

Quark is also often used as an ingredient for sandwiches, salads, and savory dishes. Quark, vegetable oil and wheat flour are the ingredients of a popular kind of baking powder leavened dough called Quarkölteig ("quark oil dough"), used in German cuisine as an alternative to yeast-leavened dough in home baking, since it is considerably easier to handle and requires no rising period. The resulting baked goods look and taste very similar to yeast-leavened goods, although they do not last as long and are thus usually consumed immediately after baking.

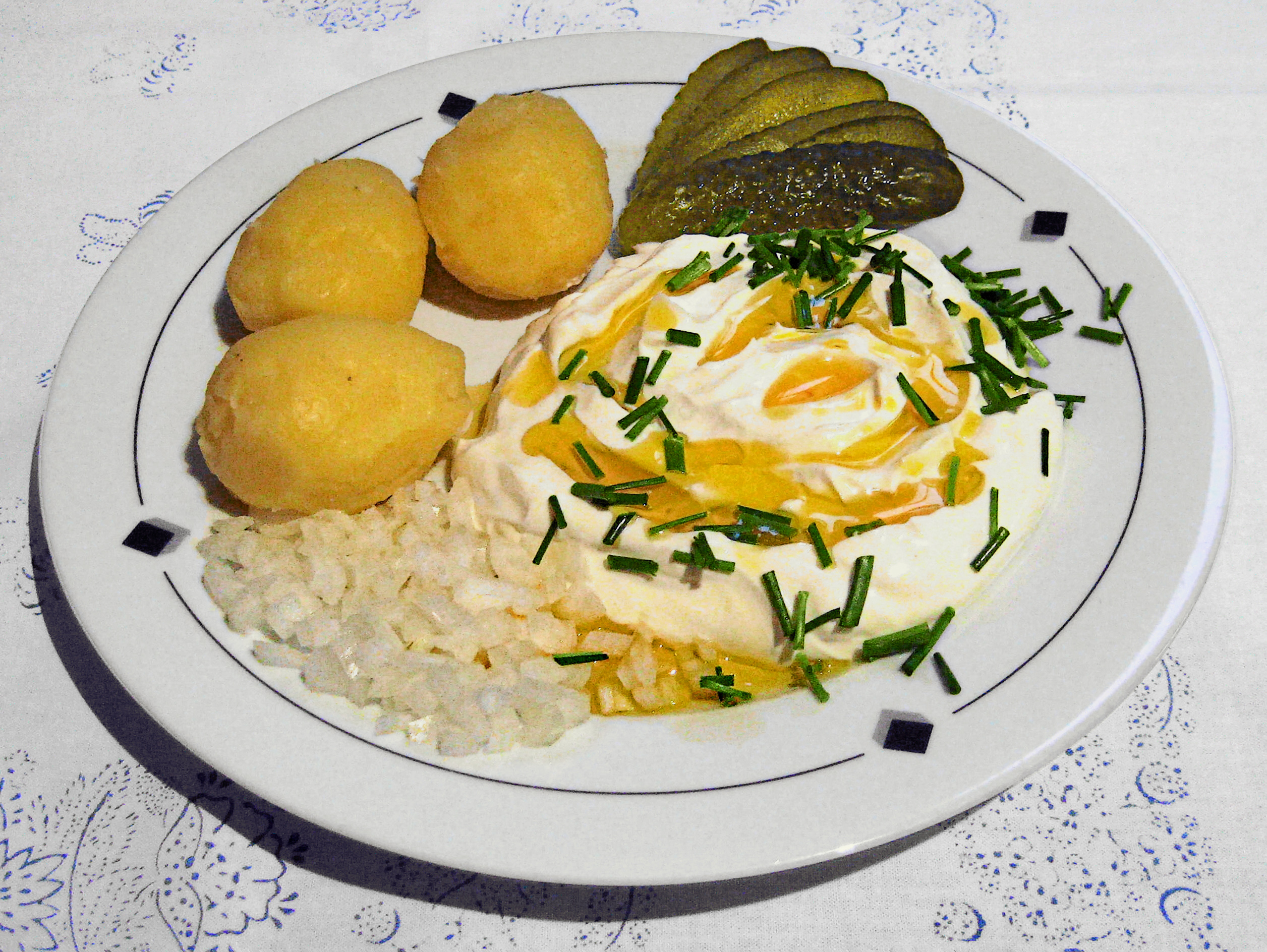
Quark with linseed oil and potatoes

In Germany, quark mixed with chopped onions and herbs such as parsley and chives is called Kräuterquark. Kräuterquark is commonly eaten with boiled potatoes and has some similarity to tzatziki which is based on yoghurt.

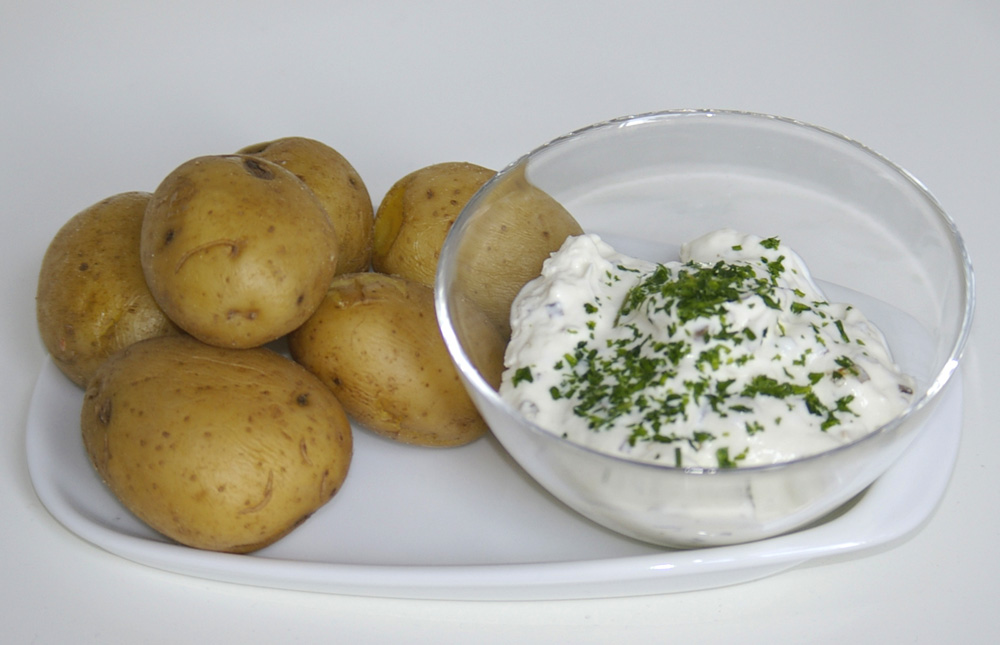
Boiled potatoes with quark and herbs (Germany)

Quark with linseed oil and potatoes is the national dish of the Sorbs in Lusatia and an iconic dish in Brandenburg and parts of Saxony. Quark also has been used among Ashkenazi Jews.

=== Slavic and Baltic countries ===
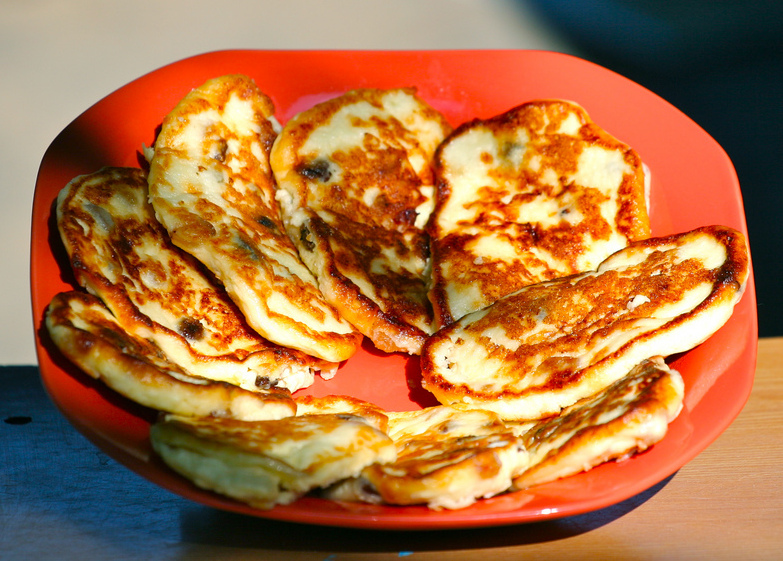
Syrniki with raisins

Desserts using quarks (Russian tvorog etc.) in Slavic regions include the tvarohovník in Slovakia, tvarožník in Czech Republic, sernik in Poland, and syrnyk in Ukraine, and cheese pancakes (syrniki/syrnyky in Russia and Ukraine).

In Poland, twaróg is mixed with mashed potatoes to produce a filling for pierogi. Twaróg is also used to make gnocchi-shaped dumplings called leniwe pierogi ("lazy pierogi"). Ukrainian recipes for varenyky or linyvi varenyky are similar but syr and mashed potatoes are different fillings which are usually not mixed together.

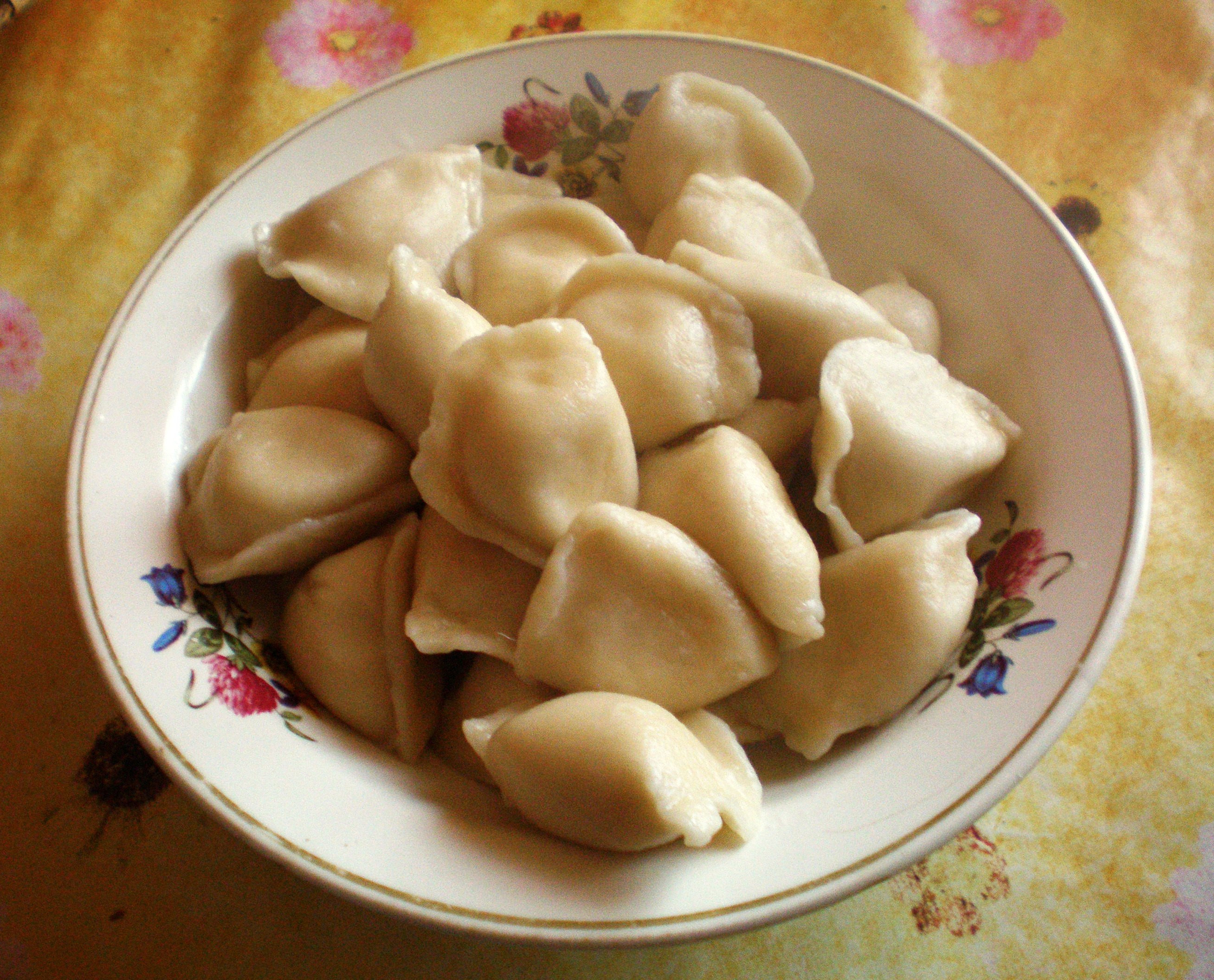
Lithuanian virtiniai with quark filling are similar to Ukrainian varenyky and Polish pierogi.

In Ukraine, Belarus and Poland cottage cheese (Ukrainian: домашній сир, Belarusian: тварог, Polish: twarog) is highly popular and is bought frequently or made at home by almost every family. In Slavic families, it is especially recommended for growing babies. It can be enjoyed simply with sour cream, or jam, sugar, sugar condensed milk, or as a breakfast food. It is often used as a stuffing in blinchiki/nalysnyky offered at many fast-food restaurants. It is also commonly used as the base for making Easter cakes. It is mixed with eggs, sugar, raisins and nuts and dried into a solid pyramid-shaped mass called paskha/syrna paska. The mass can also be fried, then known as syrniki/syrnyky.

In Latvia, quark is eaten savory mixed with sour cream and scallions on rye bread or with potatoes. In desserts, quark is commonly baked into biezpiena plātsmaize, a crusted sheet cake baked with or without raisins. A sweetened treat biezpiena sieriņš (small curd cheese) is made of small sweetened blocks of quark dipped in chocolate.

Dishes including quark

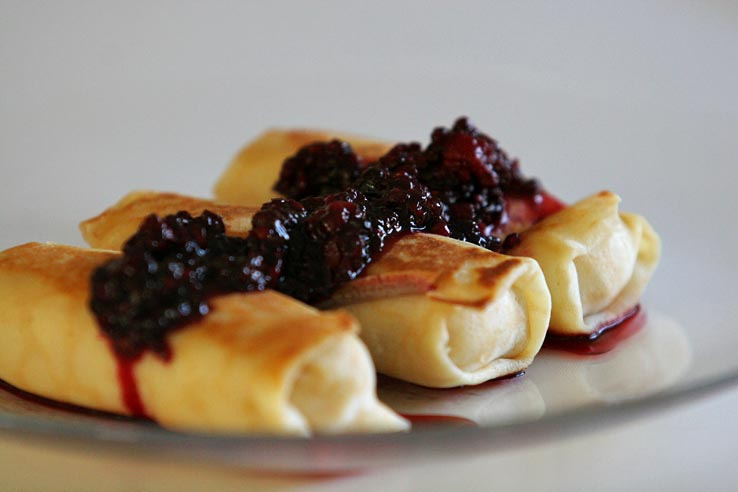
Blintzes / naleśniki filled with quark and garnished with blackberries

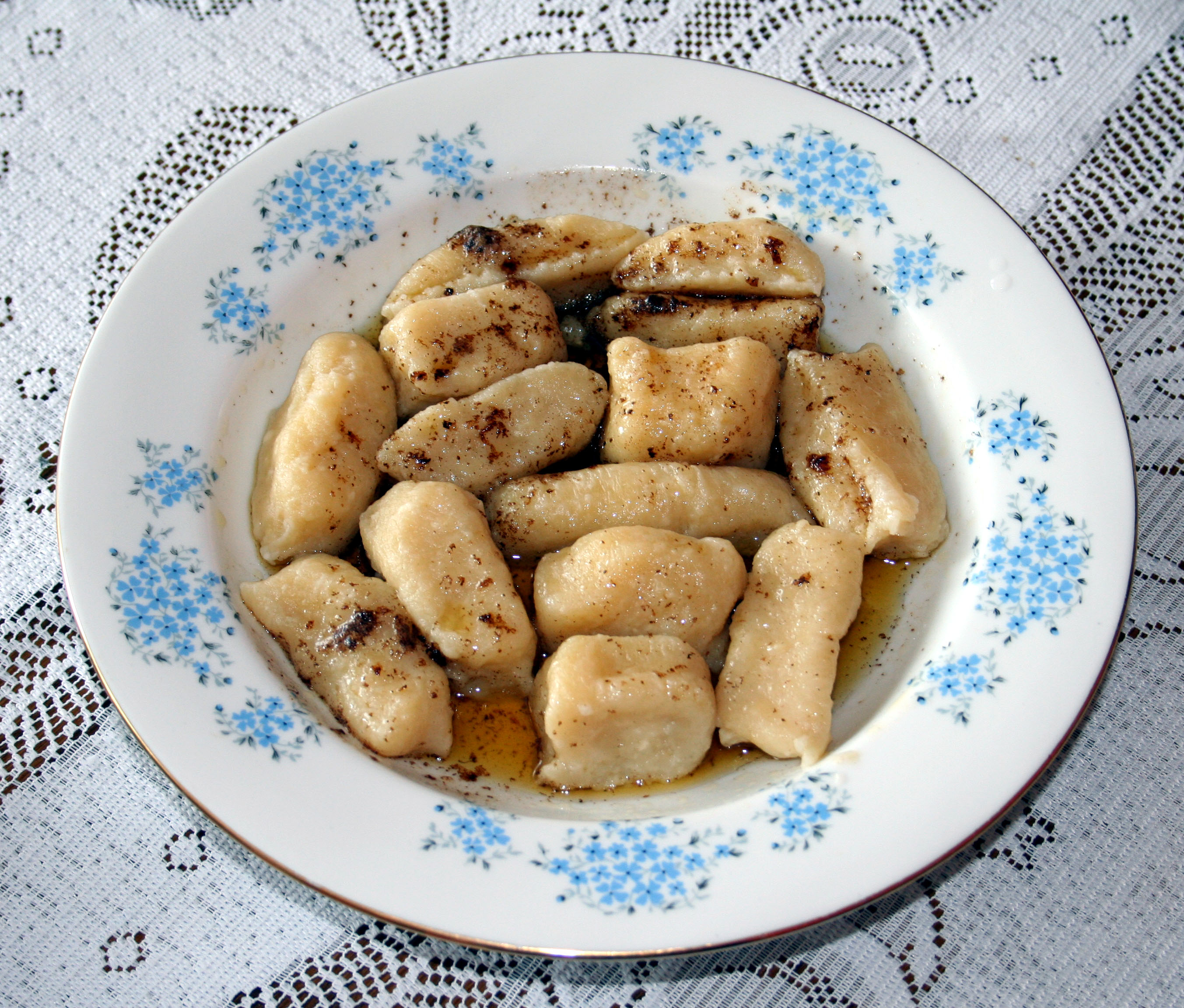
Lazy pierogi / lazy varenyky

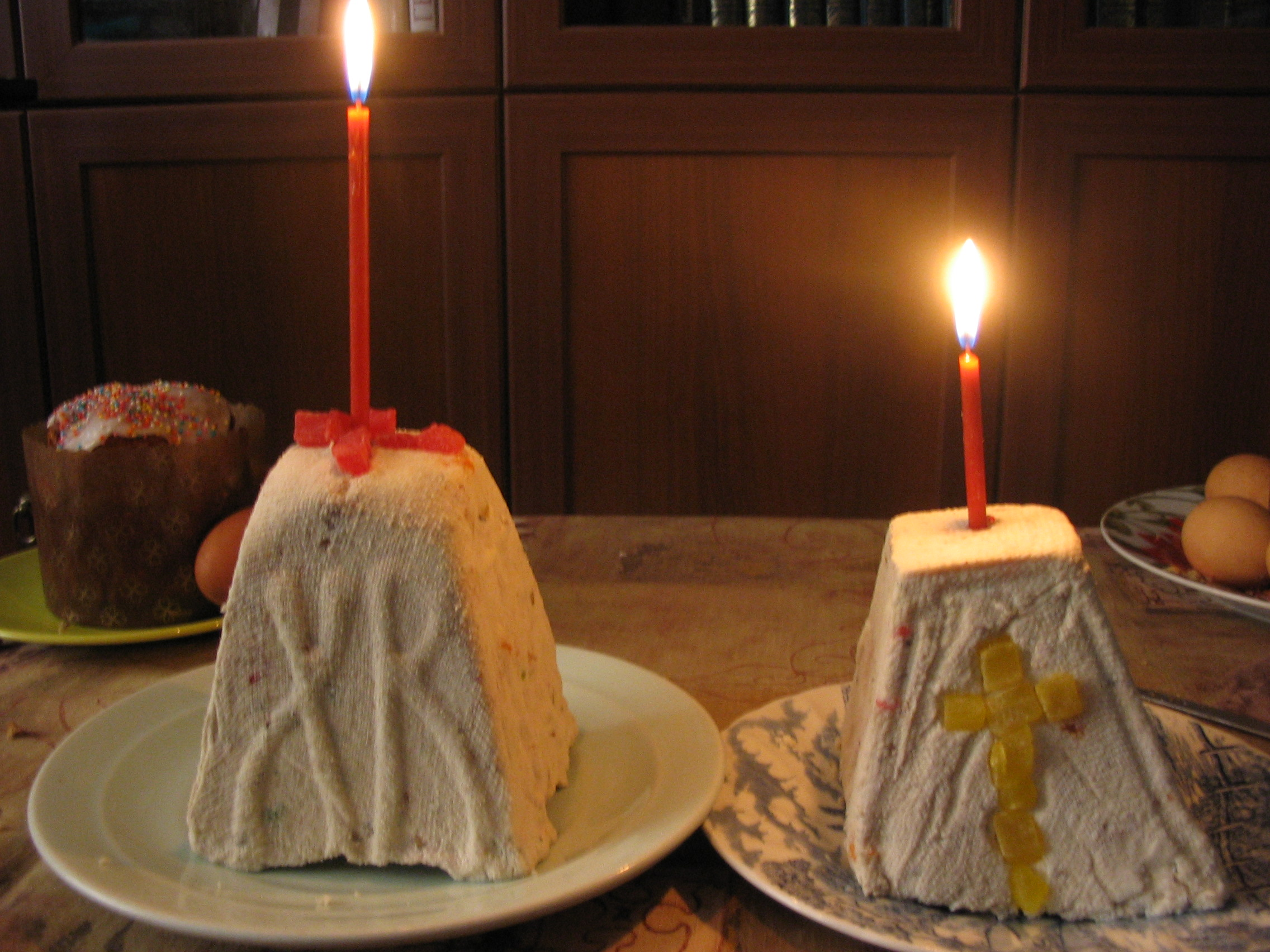
Ukrainian Syrna Paskha

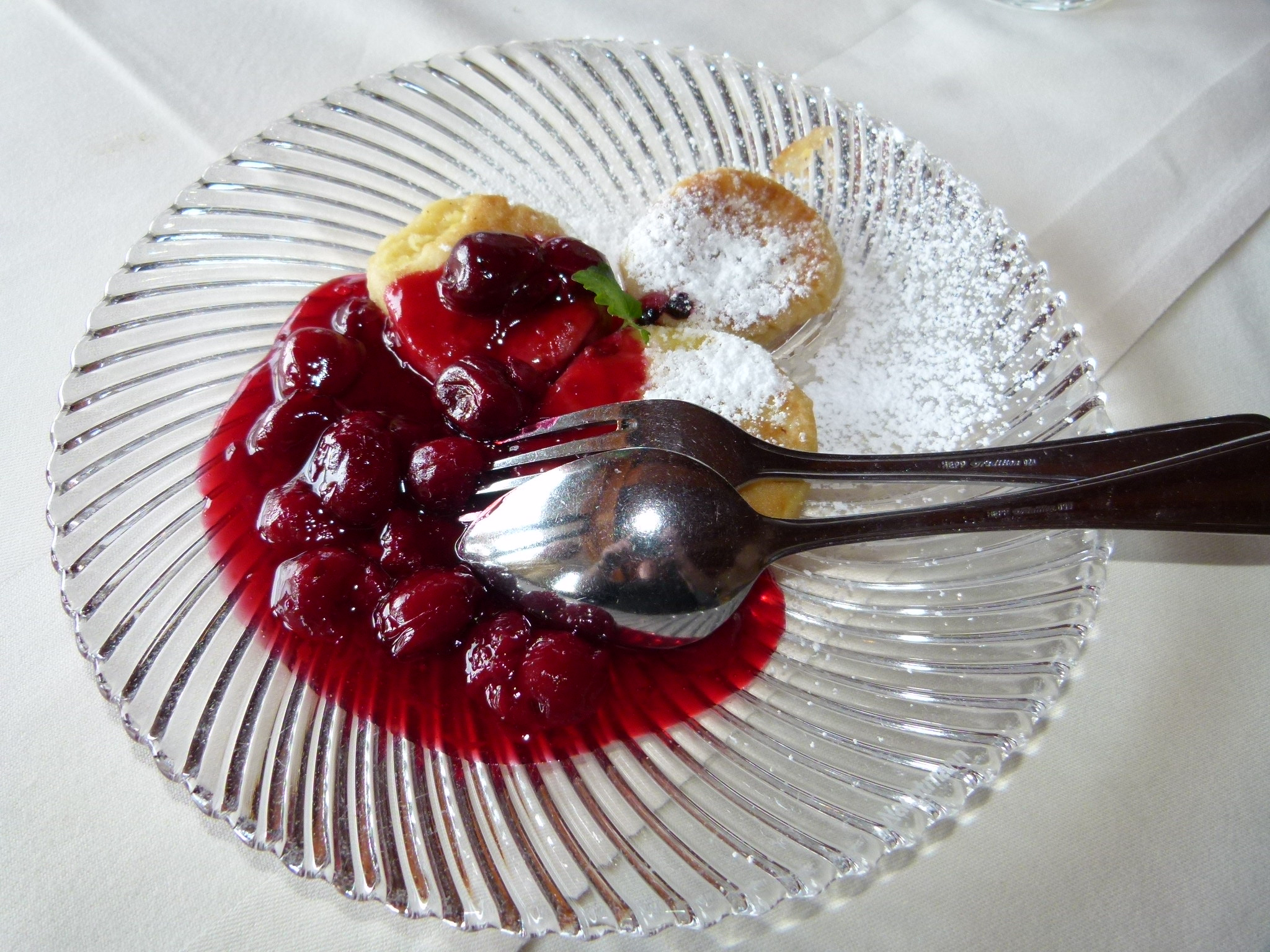
Saxon Quarkkäulchen served with hot sour cherries

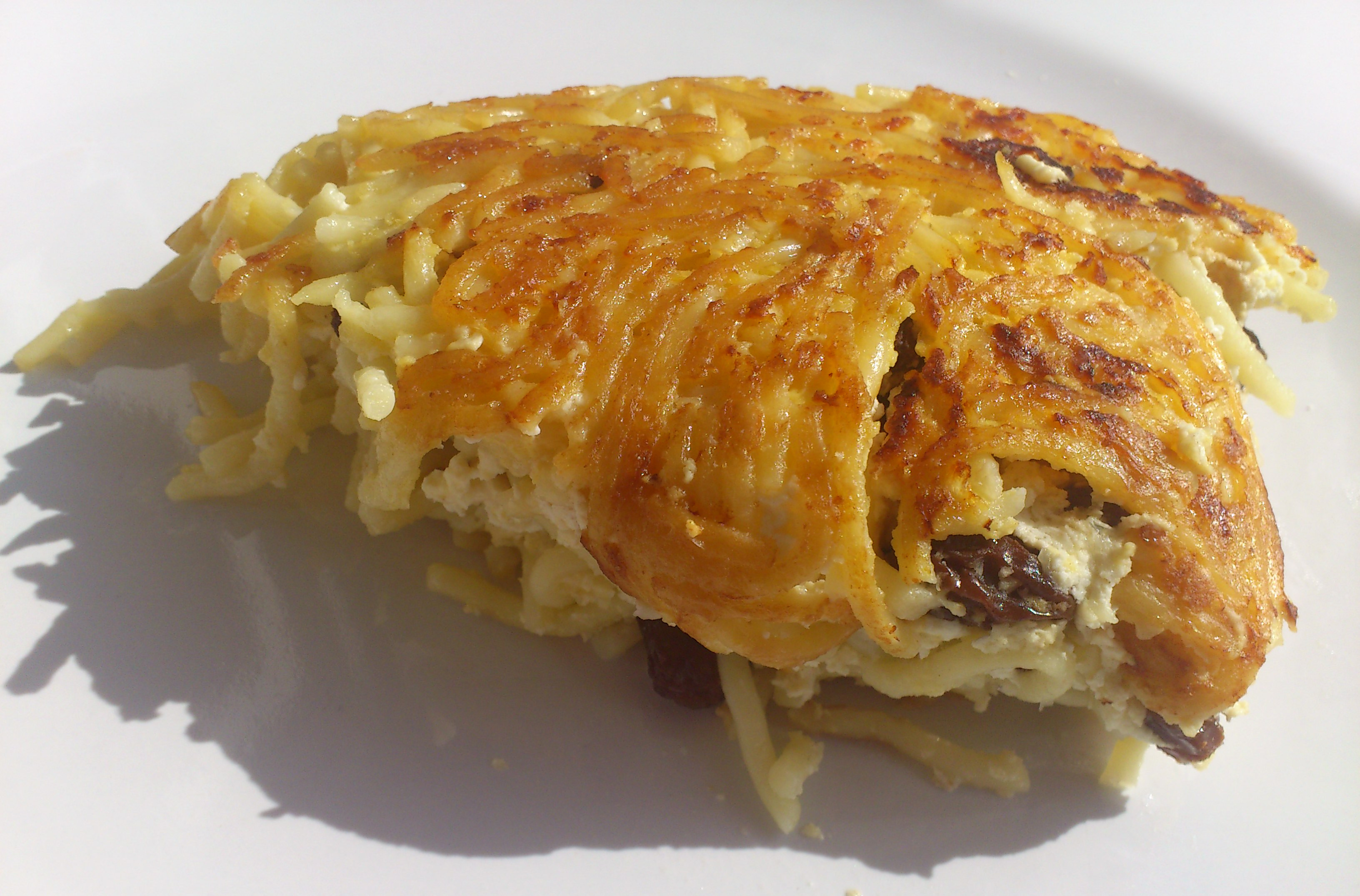
Noodle kugel with quark and raisins

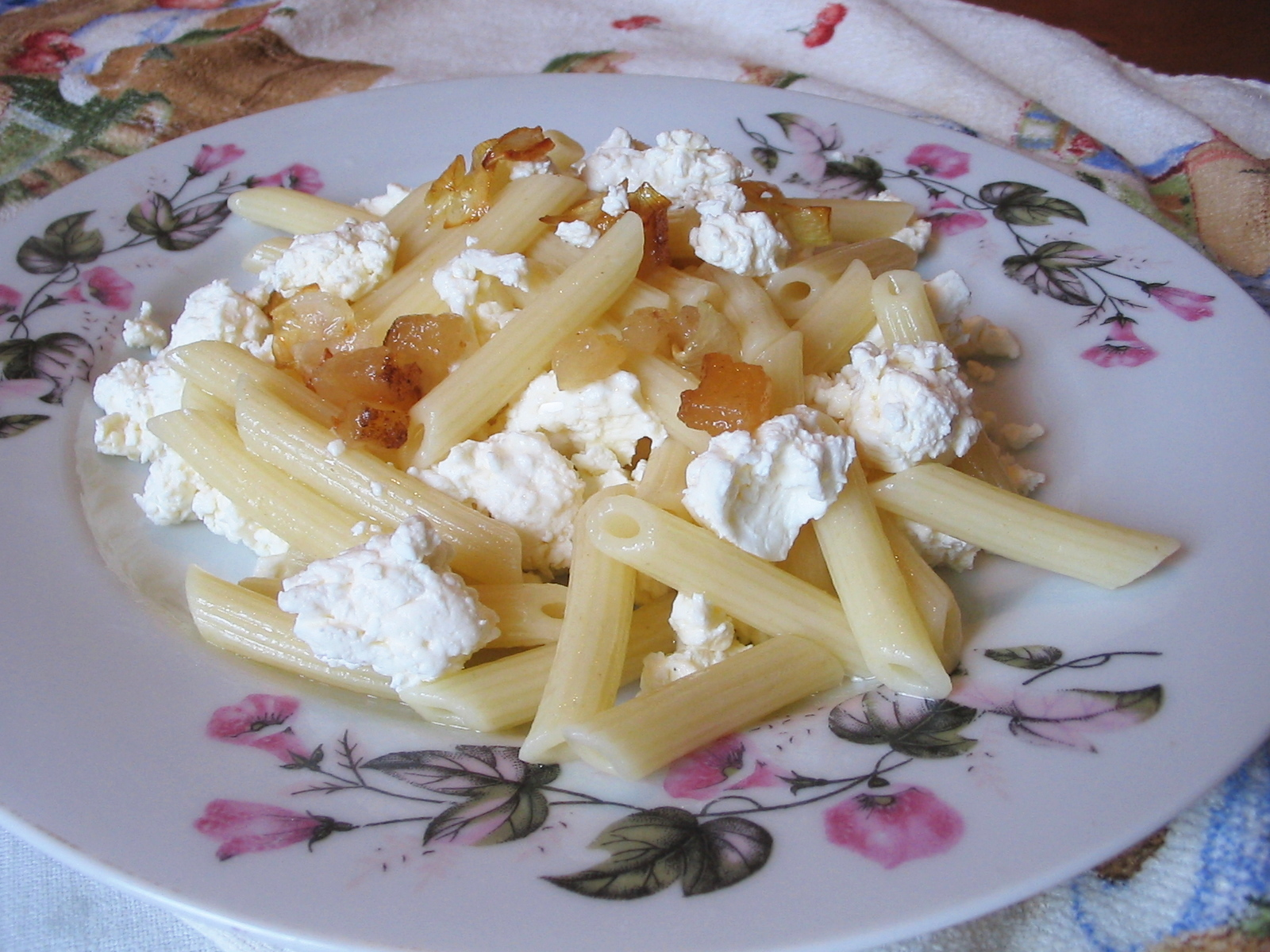
Túrós csusza

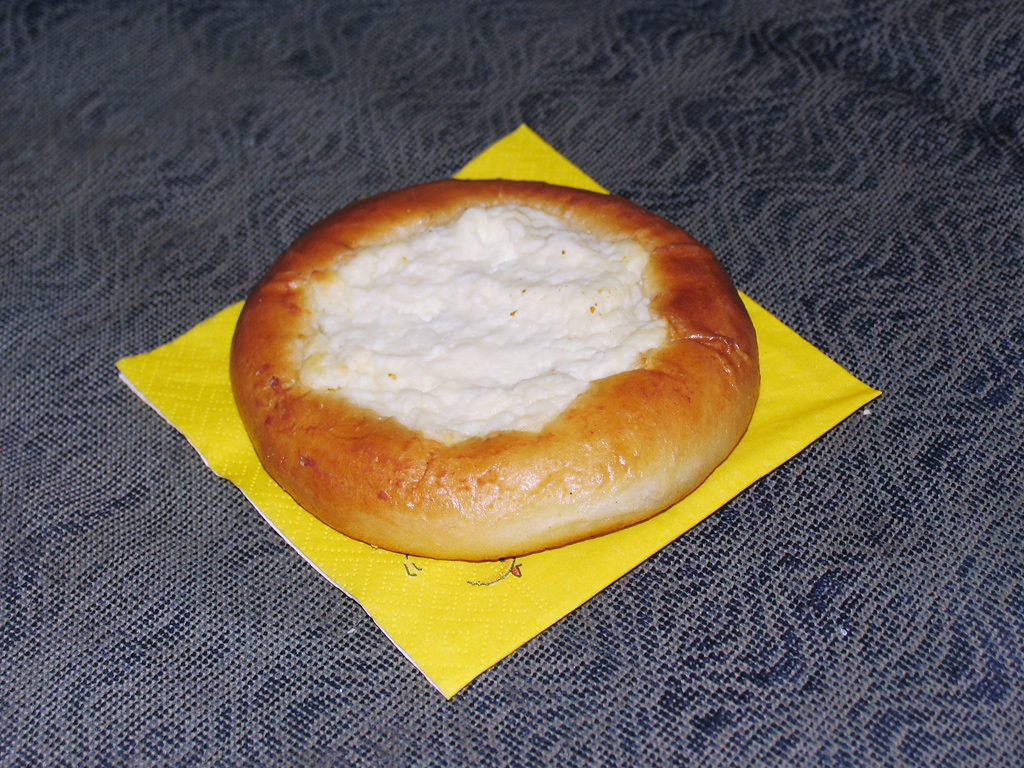
Vatrushka

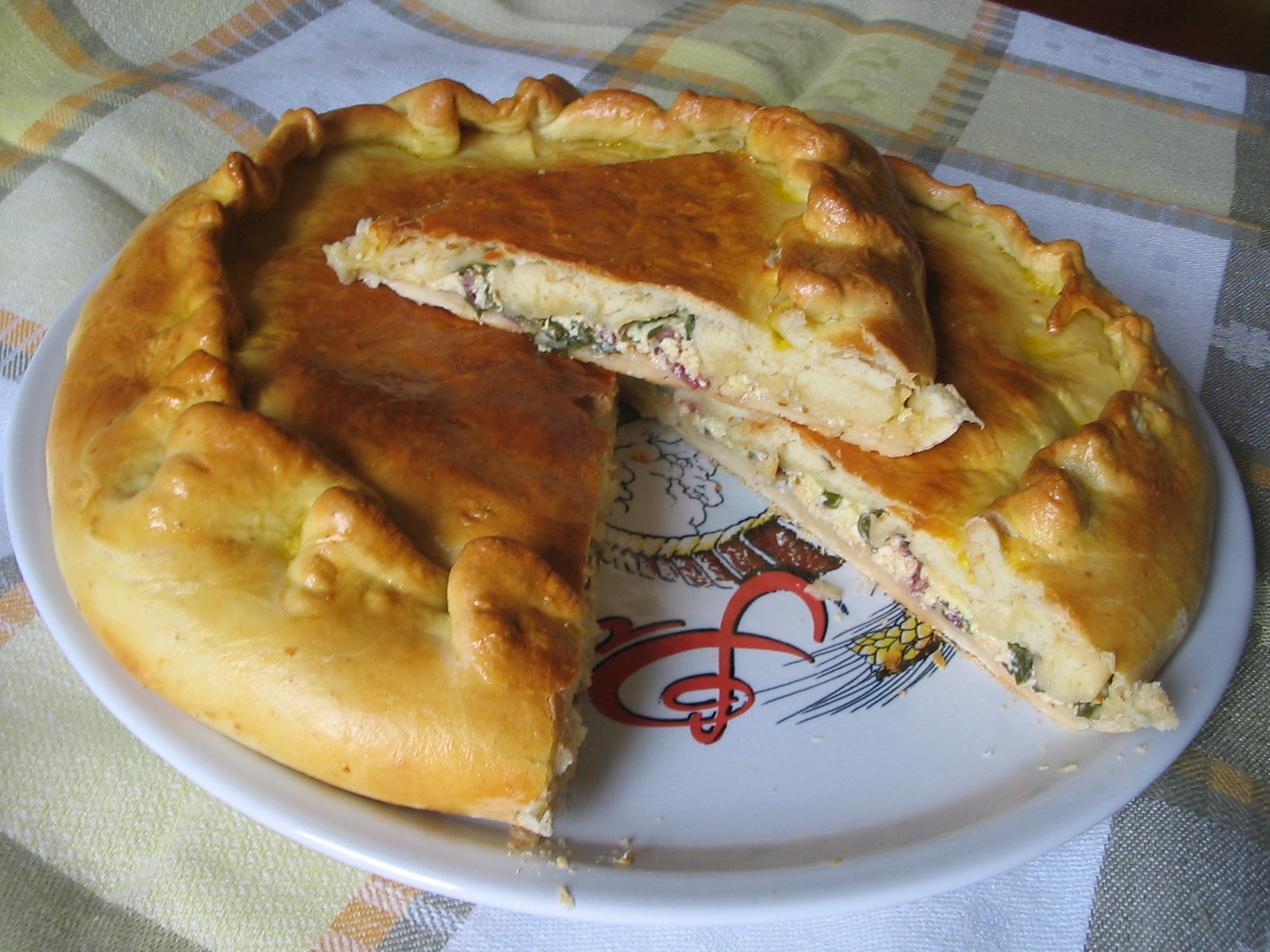
Pie (pyrih / pirog) with quark and beet greens filling

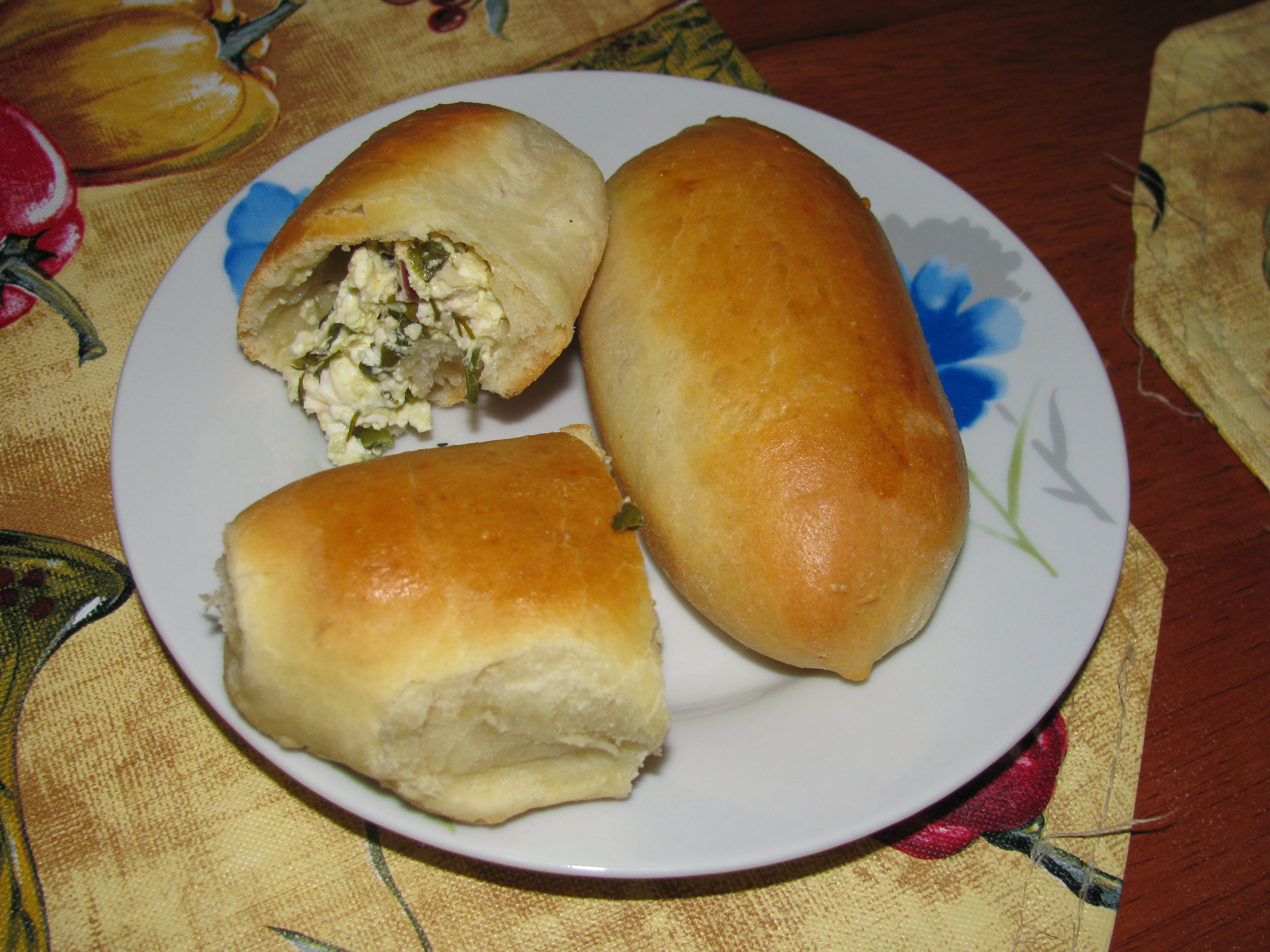
Pyrizhky / pirozhki stuffed with quark and herbs

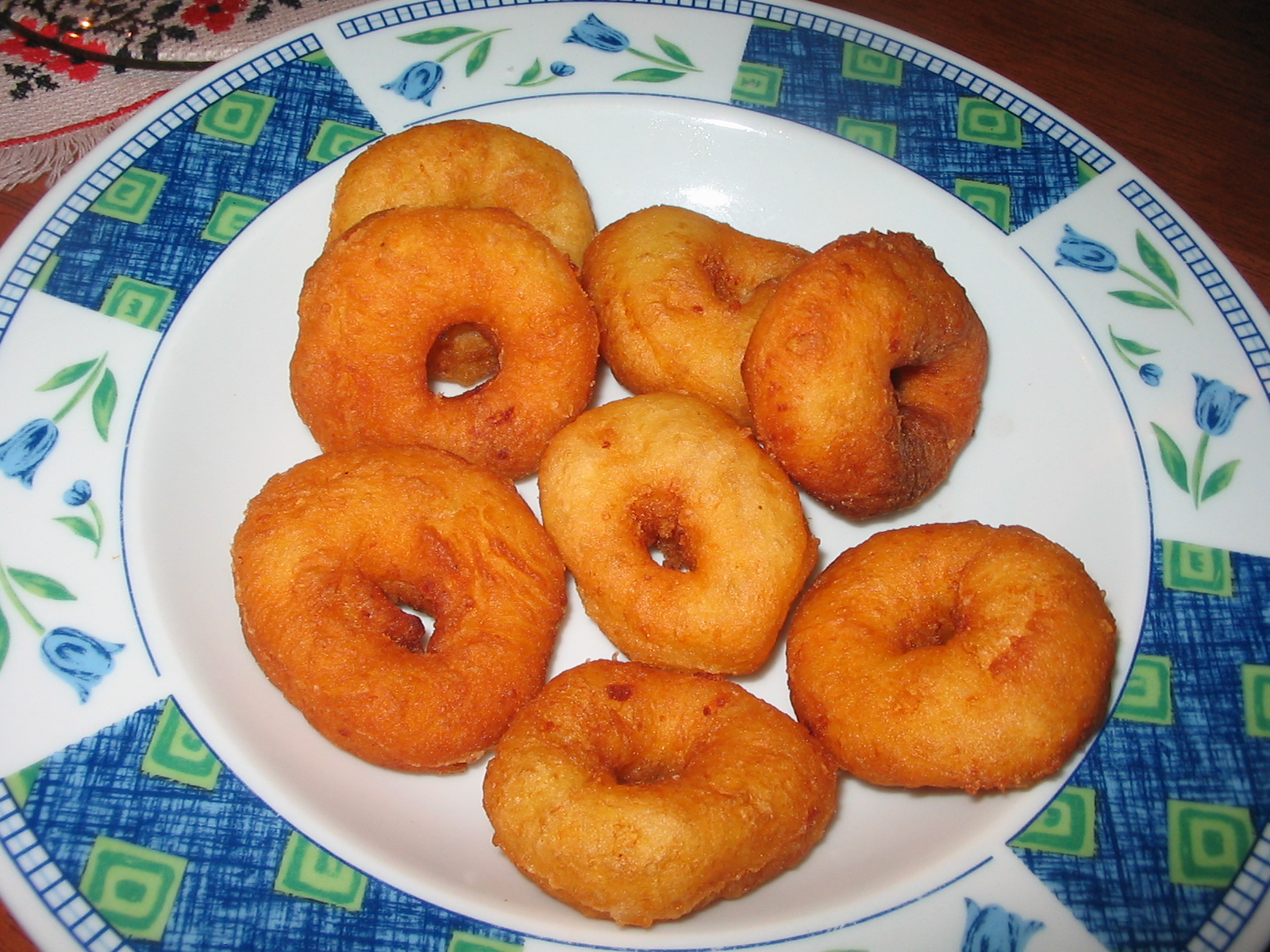
Quark rings (Pączki serowe)

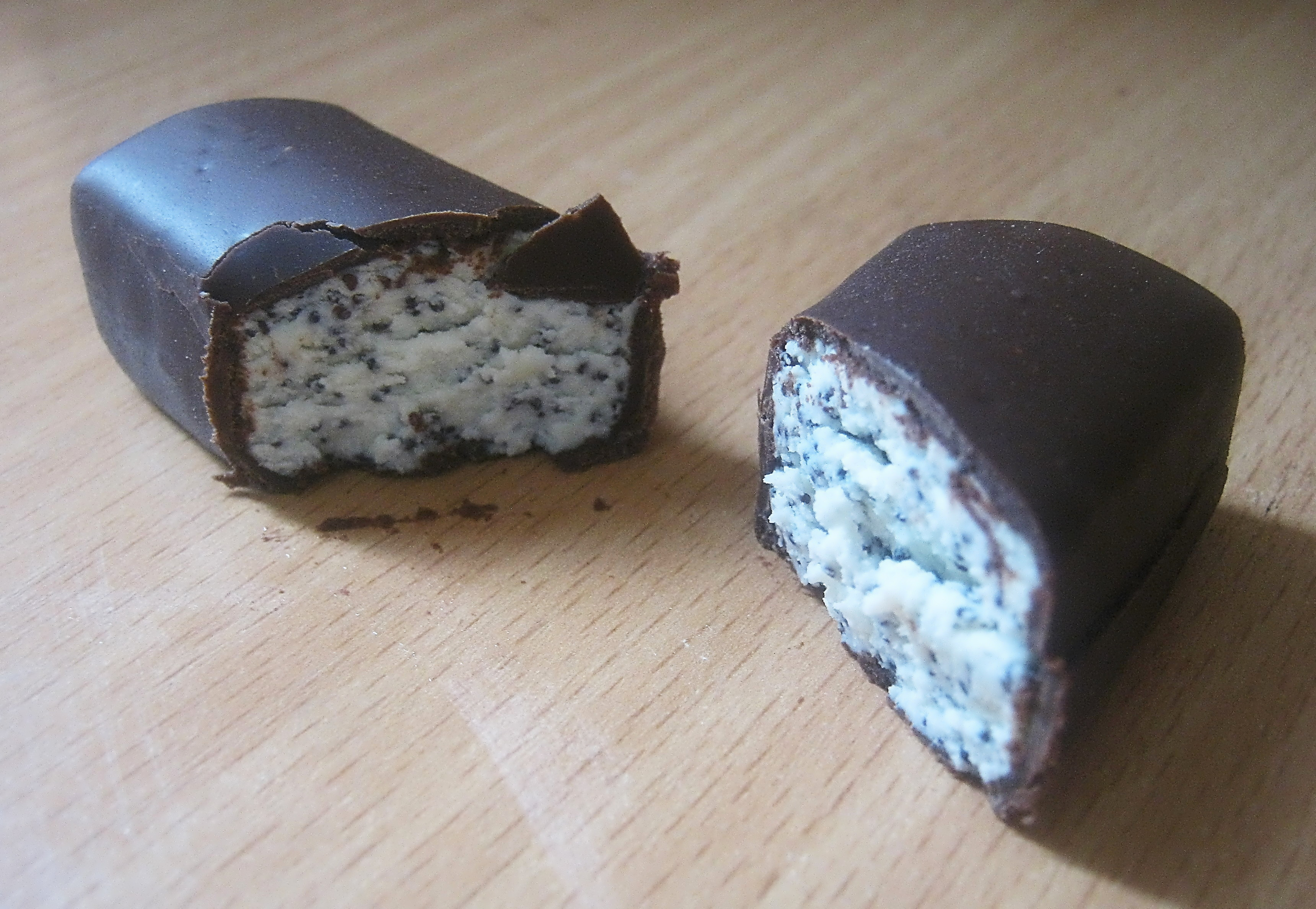
Quark chocolate snack

== Availability in other countries ==
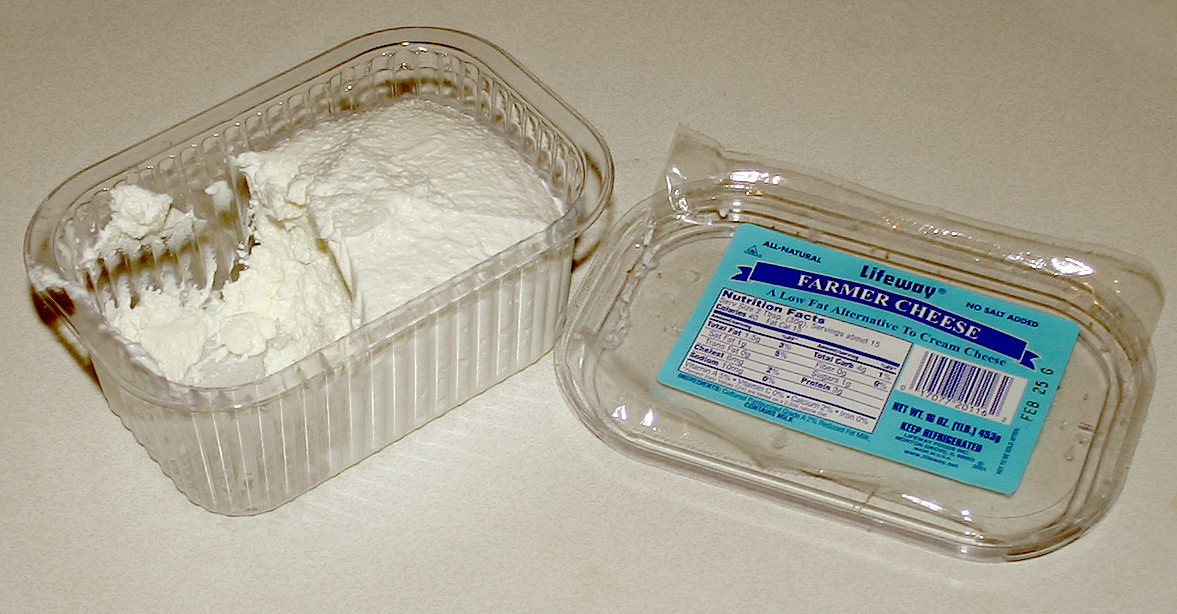
Farmer cheese produced by Lifeway Foods

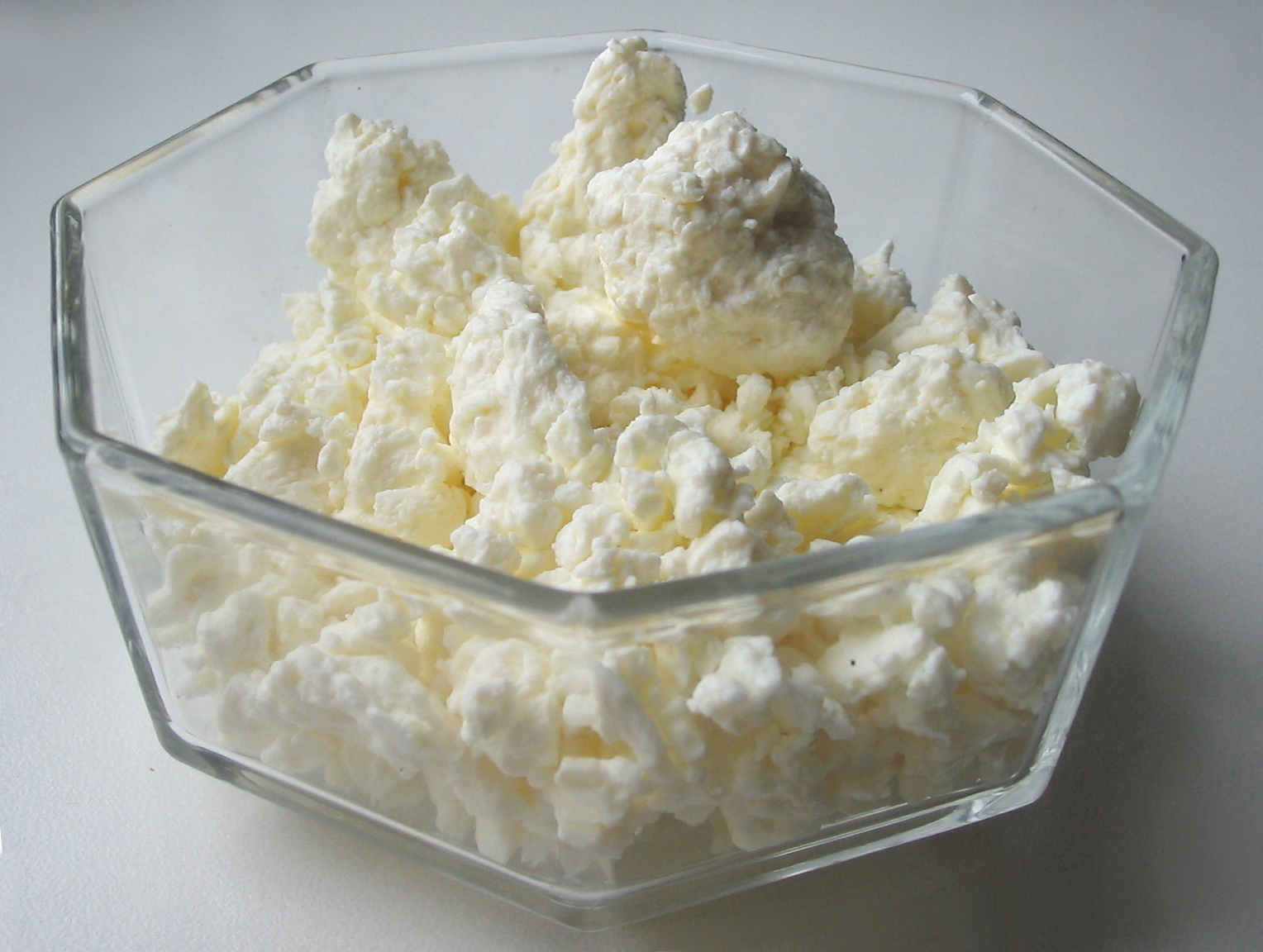
Russian tvorog, a firmer and drier variety of quark

Although common in continental Europe, manufacturing of quark is rare in the Americas. A few dairies manufacture it, such as the Vermont Creamery in Vermont, and some specialty retailers carry it. Lifeway Foods manufactures a product under the title "farmer cheese" which is available in a variety of metropolitan locations with Jewish, as well as former Soviet populations.

In Canada, the firmer East European variety of quark is manufactured by Liberté Natural Foods; a softer German-style quark is manufactured in the Didsbury, Alberta, plant of Calgary-based Foothills Creamery. Glengarry Fine Cheesemaking in Lancaster (Eastern Ontario) also produces Quark. Also available in Canada is the very similar Dry Curd Cottage Cheese manufactured by Dairyland. Quark may also be available as baking cheese, pressed cottage cheese, or fromage frais.

In Australia, Ukrainian traditional quark is produced by Blue Bay Cheese in the Mornington Peninsula. It is also sometimes available from supermarkets labelled as quark or quarg.

In New Zealand, European traditional Kwark is produced by Karikaas in North Canterbury. It is available in 350 g pots and available online and in speciality stores such as Moore Wilsons.

In the United Kingdom, fat-free quark is produced by several independent manufacturers based throughout the country. All the big four supermarkets in the UK sell their own branded quark, as well as other brands of quark.

In Finland, quark (rahka) is commonly available in supermarkets, both in plain and flavored forms. It is produced by Arla, Valio and is also sold under private labels by Kesko and S Group. It is often used as a dessert when mixed with berries and whipped cream. Karelians have a dish called piimäpiirakka, which is a quark pie.

== See also ==
- Clabber (food)
- Mizithra
- List of ancient dishes and foods
- List of German cheeses
- List of cheeses
- Queso fresco
