= Dairyland Canada =

Canadian dairy products company

Dairyland Foods
- Type: Subsidiary
- Industry: Dairy
- Parent: Saputo Inc.
- Website: dairyland.ca

Dairyland is a dairy business that operates in Port Coquitlam, British Columbia. Now owned by Saputo Dairy Foods Canada, Dairyland was originally an operating arm of BC dairy farmers' cooperatives and was legally named Agrifoods International Cooperative Ltd. at the time of the sale of the majority of its assets to Saputo Incorporated. Its products are sold across Canada.

Dairyworld Foods, a Canadian-based dairy cooperative, was purchased by Saputo Inc. in 2001. Dairyworld Foods (previously known as Agrifoods International Cooperative Ltd.), produces milk and a range of dairy and other food products which are sold across Canada at large retailers.

== History ==
In July 1992, Dairyworld was founded when Fraser Valley Milk Producers Association (Dairyland Foods), Northern Alberta Dairy Producers (Nu-maid Dairies), and Central Alberta Dairy Producers (Alpha Milk Co.) merged. In 1993, Dufferin Employment Co-op Ltd (Manco) joined Dairyworld. In June 1996, Dairy Producers Cooperative Ltd. joined Dairyworld, soon after it changed its name to Agrifoods International. In 1997, Dairyworld sold its ice cream to Nestle Canada.

In 2001, Agrifoods International sold all of its processing and brands, except Ultima Foods, to Saputo Inc.

In November 2009, Dairyland products were replaced in Ontario by Neilson after Saputo's acquisition of the Neilson Dairy brand from George Weston Limited.
