= Túrós csusza =

Hungarian cheese and pasta dish

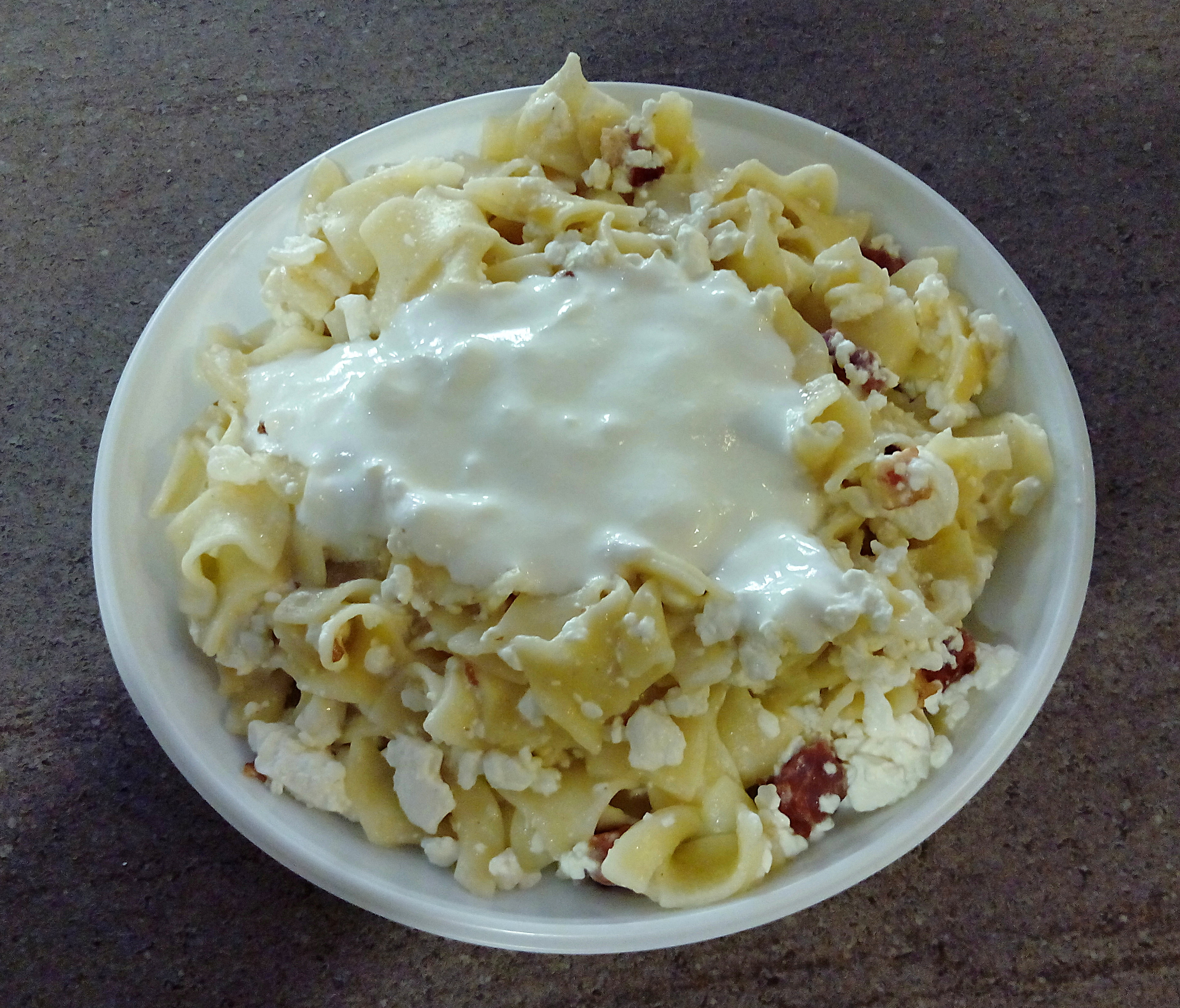
- Place of origin: Hungary
- Main ingredients: Noodles or pasta, curd cheese

Túrós csusza (Hungarian: [ˈtuːroːʃt͡ʃusɒ]) is a traditional Hungarian savoury curd cheese noodle dish made with small home-made noodles or pasta.

Traditionally, noodles used for this dish are home-made with flour and eggs, mixed into a dough, and torn by hand into uneven fingernail-sized pieces that are then boiled in water.

The noodles are cooked in salt water and drained, crumbled cheese (túró), chopped, fried, crispy bacon, topped with thick Hungarian sour cream (tejföl) and lightly salted. The mixture is then heated in the oven for a few minutes before serving.

== Other Hungarian pasta dishes ==
=== Savoury ===
==== Cabbage squares ====
Cabbage squares or cabbage and noodles is a savoury Hungarian pasta dish.

Macaroni bows or home-made thin pasta squares (like tiny lasagne) are boiled in salted water, drained, and mixed with some cooking oil or fat. The finely grated cabbage is slowly sautéed in a bowl with oil or fat, with salt, freshly ground black pepper and a pinch of sugar, until it becomes golden brown. The cabbage is then mixed into the hot pasta and served.

=== Sweet ===
==== Walnut pasta ====
Layers of pasta, jam and ground walnuts mixed with sugar, finished with noodles, are placed into a greased pan. The dish is heated in the oven for a short while and served hot.

==== Poppy seed pasta ====
Boil noodles in salted water. Sugar and ground poppy seeds are mixed and sprinkled on the hot noodles and served. This dish is also a Polish meal and a Polish Christmas dish.

== See also ==
- List of pasta dishes
