= Yoplait =

French yogurt brand

Yoplait France S.A.S.
- Yoplait logo in France, the UK, and Canada
- Type: Private
- Industry: Food processing
- Founded: November 22, 1965; 60 years ago
- Founder: Jean-Marie Perrin
- Headquarters: 150, rue Gallieni, Boulogne-Billancourt
- Area served: Worldwide
- Key people: André Gaillard, Jean-Marie Perrin, M. Theoleyre
- Products: Dairy products
- Revenue: ▲€750 million (2023)
- Owners: Worldwide (except the US): Sodiaal; In the US: Lactalis (Midwest Yogurt)
- Number of employees: 1 250 (2024)
- Subsidiaries: Liberté Inc.
- Website: www.yoplait.com

Yoplait (/ˈjoʊpleɪ/ YOH-play, French: [jɔplɛ]) is a French dessert company and the world's largest franchise brand of yogurt.

Yoplait is fully owned by the French dairy cooperative Sodiaal since 2021. In North America, the Canadian subsidiary was taken over by Sodiaal in 2025. The American subsidiary Yoplait USA was taken over by the French group Lactalis on June 30 of that year.

== History ==
In 1964, 100,000 French farmers agreed to merge six regional dairy cooperatives in order to more efficiently market their products at the national level. On 25 September 1965, the Yoplait brand was launched as a new national brand, as a portmanteau of the brands of two member cooperatives, Yola and Coplait.

The company's logo is a six-petaled flower designed by Philippe Morlighem, each petal representing one of the six main cooperatives' founders. A redesigned logo, which has been slowly rolled out since the late 2000s, uses a flower with only five petals.

On 18 May 2011, General Mills announced it had agreed to purchase a controlling 51% interest in the brand's main operating company Yoplait S.A.S., and a 50% interest in a related company owning the brand's intellectual property, with Sodiaal retaining the remainder. The announcement of the completion of the acquisition was made on 1 July 2011.

On 30 November 2021, General Mills sold its share back to Sodiaal.

== World franchises ==
The Yoplait logo in the U.S., which has been used by Lactalis' Midwest Yogurt since 2025

=== Australia ===
In Australia, Yoplait is locally manufactured by Bega Dairy & Drinks. It uses the slogan "Yoplait; French for Yoghurt!".

In November 2019, China's Mengniu Dairy attempted to purchase Lion Dairy (Bega Dairy's earlier name) from Japan's Kirin Holdings, however due to rising geopolitical tensions between China and Australia approval from Australian regulators was deemed "unlikely to" materialize and the announced sale was cancelled. In November 2020, Lion Dairy was sold to the Bega Cheese group for A$534 million.

=== Canada ===
In Canada, General Mills markets pre-stirred Yoplait yogurt, Minigo, Tubes, Source, Creamy, Delicieux, Yop, Yoplait Basket, Yoptimal, and Asana. In 1971, the Coopérative Agricole de Granby, which went on to become the largest dairy cooperative in the country—Agropur—launched the Yoplait brand in Canada. In 1993, Agropur and Agrifoods (the two largest dairy cooperatives in Canada) combined their yogurt and fresh cheese marketing and manufacturing activities to form Ultima Foods. Ultima Foods oversaw Yoplait brand products throughout Canada until 2012, when General Mills took over the licence (Ultima Foods continues to manufacture Yoplait products in Canada as a subcontractor, but has also launched a wholly owned rival product line, iögo).

In January 2025, General Mills completed the sale of its Canadian Yogurt business to Sodiaal.

=== Chile ===
In Chile, the Yoplait brand is managed by Quillayes.

=== France ===
In France, the Yoplait brand is managed by Yoplait France.

=== Ireland ===
In Ireland, Glanbia controlled the Yoplait brand from 1973 until 2017, when its dairy processing business was offloaded to form the joint venture Glanbia Ireland, with the Glanbia Co-operative Society holding 60% ownership and Glanbia 40%.

=== Israel ===
Yoplait yogurt produced in Israel

Yoplait in Israel is managed by Tnuva, Israel's largest dairy, and products are kosher. The company's drinkable yogurt comes in a 100-gram shot-style bottle with a center opening for easy gripping. Yoplait-brand flavored yogurts account for 42–52% of the Israeli market. Tnuva and Yoplait entered into a partnership to set up production facilities in Romania in 2007. In 2009, Tnuva introduced a 500-gram (18 oz) family-size yogurt called Yoplait YYY that comes in resealable containers.

=== Italy ===
Yoplait entered the Italian market in 1992 through a joint-venture between Sodiaal and Kraft Foods. At the end of the following year, Yoplait achieved a market share of 2.5%. Yoplait withdrew from the Italian market in 1999.

=== Mexico ===
In Mexico, the Yoplait brand is managed by Sigma Alimentos.

=== New Zealand ===
In New Zealand, the Yoplait brand is manufactured by and franchised to Goodman Fielder.

=== Norway ===
The franchise in Norway is held by Fjordland, a brand of Tine, and has been since 1998. In 2014, Q-Meieriene filed suit against Fjordland for "allegedly copying a unique container for the Icelandic cultured milk product Skyr", as the latter uses a similar shape for one of its products.

=== Portugal ===
In Portugal, Yoplait was franchised to Gelgurte until 2010, when the franchising was not renewed with headquarters. It has not been made or sold in the country ever since.

=== Spain ===
In 2001, the Soldier Spanish brand from Social stopped its production and commercialization in Spain closing its Alcobendas production plant.

=== South Korea ===
In South Korea, the Yoplait brand is managed and manufactured by Binggrae.

=== United Kingdom ===
In the United Kingdom, Yoplait UK Ltd is now 100% owned by Yoplait France. In April 2009, the joint venture between Yoplait and Dairy Crest ended. Yoplait UK Ltd is based in General Mills' European head office; Harman House in Uxbridge, London, United Kingdom. Tubed yogurts are called Frubes (portmanteau of fruit and tube) in the UK, half under the Petits Filous branding and half under the Wildlife Choobs branding. Petits Filous pots, Wildlife yogurt pots, Cal-in+ pot yogurts and yogurt drinks and Yop drinking yogurt are also sold in the UK.

=== United States ===
The Yoplait brand first entered the United States in 1974 when it was licensed by the Michigan Cottage Cheese Company. In 1977, General Mills acquired the U.S. marketing rights to Yoplait from that company, along with a yogurt plant in Reed City, Michigan. General Mills has been the exclusive franchisee of the Yoplait brand in the United States ever since.

General Mills opened a plant in Carson, California to manufacture Yoplait for the West Coast, where it became the best-selling yogurt brand. In 1981, General Mills began selling Yoplait on the East Coast.

Yoplait products are available in a variety of fruit-based flavors that come in a truncated-conical container sealed with an aluminum foil top. Under the Yoplait label, General Mills also markets Trix Yogurt, based on the flavors of their breakfast cereal of the same name, and Go-Gurt, where various flavors are packaged in plastic tubes for spoonless eating; these brands are targeted to children. A probiotic line of yogurt is marketed under the brand name Yo-Plus. As of Autumn, 2023, Original Yoplait states on the package that it contains bio-engineered ingredients, which is corroborated by a general statement on its website.

During the 2000s and 2010s, Yoplait steadily lost market share in the United States to Greek yogurt brands, especially Chobani. General Mills' attempts to market Greek yogurt versions of Yoplait repeatedly failed. General Mills executives carefully studied these failures, concluded that what attracted consumers to Chobani was the charming authenticity of its rags-to-riches backstory, and decided to embrace the authenticity of the Yoplait brand's French heritage.

General Mills launched the Oui by Yoplait brand on 10 July 2017, by adapting and marketing an existing 20-year-old French product line, Yoplait Saveur d’Autrefois, as French-style yogurt. Oui's selling point is that unlike most yogurts which are fermented in bulk and then poured fully formed into separate containers, all the ingredients are poured into separate glass jars and separately fermented in each jar. This "pot-set" process supposedly stabilizes the yogurt without the need for additional ingredients like cornstarch or gelatin.

On June 30, 2025, Lactalis acquired Yoplait and other US yogurt brands from General Mills and placed them within the entity Lactalis Midwest Yogurt.

=== United Arab Emirates ===
In the United Arab Emirates, the Yoplait brand is a subsidiary of Agthia Group.

== Community involvement ==
In the U.S., Yoplait participates in an annual program called "Save Lids to Save Lives" to raise money for breast cancer research. Yoplait donates ten cents per pink foil lid that are mailed to the company, but they state in fine print on all promotional materials that their donations will be capped at $2,000,000 per year. This money is donated to the Susan G. Komen Breast Cancer Foundation. Yoplait has been the primary sponsor of Race for the Cure, a marathon held to raise additional research money, since 2001.

The American franchise of Yoplait added a rim on the bottom of the yogurt containers to keep animals such as skunks from accidentally getting their heads caught. A label was added to the container stating: "Protect Wildlife: Crush Cup Before Disposal."

== Controversy ==
The 2011 documentary Pink Ribbons, Inc. reported that some products sold under the "Save Lids to Save Lives" campaign had previously contained milk from cows treated with bovine somatotropin, a growth hormone banned in many nations for its possible link to diseases in humans, until the company agreed to remove it.

A 2012 television advertisement for Yoplait prompted criticism from the National Eating Disorders Association due to its portrayal of a woman making difficult food choices. The company announced within a few days of the complaint that they would pull the ad, saying, "We aren't sure that everyone saw the ad that way, but if anyone did, that was not our intent and is cause for concern."

Since at least 1998, Yoplait has been the target of a campaign by animal advocates, including the Humane Society, to redesign its traditional tapered cup design because small animals can easily get their heads stuck inside and then suffocate or die from dehydration.

== See also ==
- Danone
