= Curd snack =

Type of sweet dairy food made from curd cheese

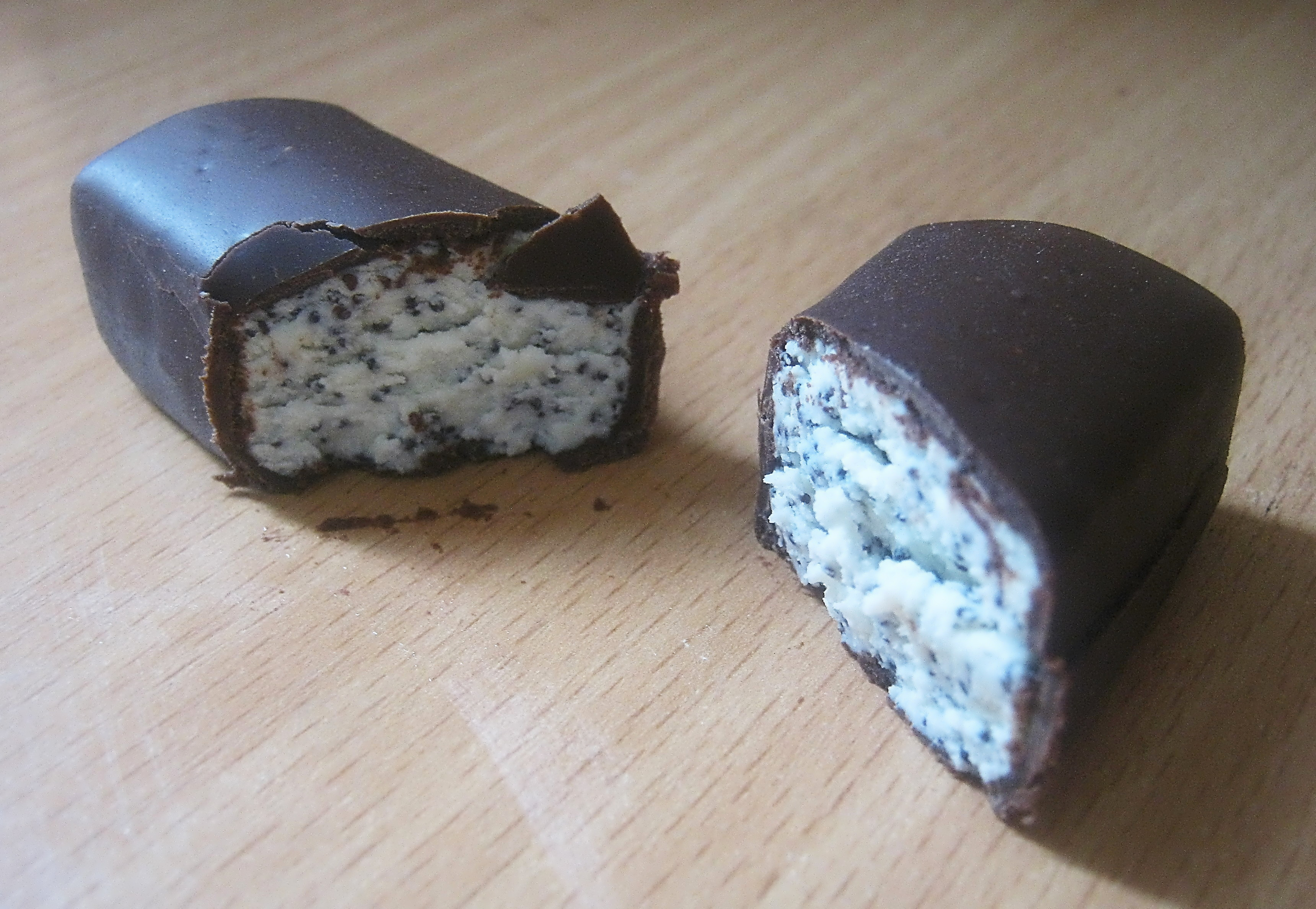
- Cross-section of a chocolate-glazed curd snack with poppy seeds
- Alternative names: cottage cheese bar, curd cheese bar, quark bar
- Type: Dairy product
- Region or state: Baltic states and Eastern Europe
- Main ingredients: curd cheese and sugar
- Ingredients generally used: Various glazes and fillings
- Variations: Túró Rudi
- Food energy (per serving): 140 ~ 350

Curd snack, quark bar, cottage cheese bar or curd cheese bar is a type of sweet dairy food made from glazed or unglazed curd cheese with or without filling.

They became ubiquitous in the Soviet Union, and today curd snacks remain popular in the former Soviet Union, such as the Baltic states (kohuke in Estonia), Russia (Russian: творо́жный сыро́к, romanized: tvoróžnyj syrók), Ukraine, Georgia, as well as in some former Soviet-aligned ones, such as Hungary (Túró Rudi), Poland, Romania and Mongolia.

== Production and shelf life ==
The main part of a curd snack is made from curd cheese, which is mixed with sugar, sweeteners or other ingredients and milled into a homogenous paste that is pressed into the desired shape and filled with jam or other fillings. The formed bars then pass through the so-called 'glaze waterfall' that coats them in chocolate or another type of glaze. Finally, the curd snacks are cooled in a cooling tunnel and packed. The shelf life of curd snacks is only a few days, which can be extended to 1–2 weeks if refrigerated.

== History ==
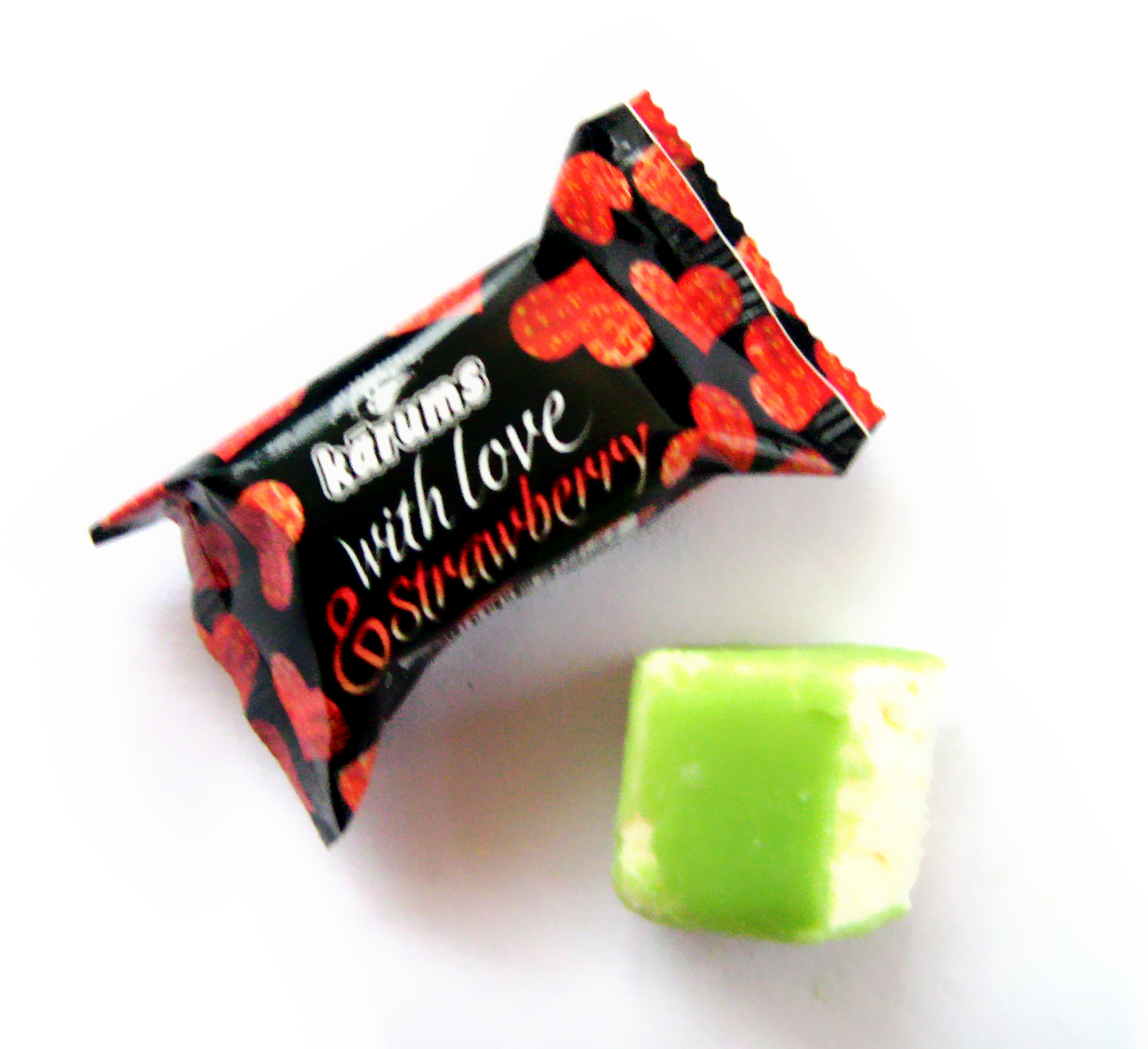
A modern Latvian curd snack Kārums with a kiwifruit glazing and strawberry filling

The mass production of curd snacks began in the 1950s in the Soviet Union and they quickly gained popularity. Initially, they were flavoured with simple ingredients, such as vanilla, cocoa and raisins, but since the 1990s the curd snacks have become more varied and also contain ingredients such as cookie bites, apricot, strawberry jam and boiled condensed milk.

In 2012, the Kārums curd snack was voted the favorite product by Latvian consumers, receiving 20% of the votes. Curd snacks have also remained highly popular in Estonia. According to a 2010 consumer survey, 74% of Estonians ate as much or even more curd snacks than before, with 57% preferring local curd snack brands over imported ones. In 2013, Estonia set the world record for the biggest curd snack, which weighed 537 kilograms. Curd snacks have also remained highly popular in Lithuania.

Some popular curd snack brands include Kārums from Latvia, Nykštukas, and Magija and Pasaka from Lithuania.

== See also ==
- Twinkie
- Gansito
