= Go-Gurt =

Sweetened yogurt snack-in-a-tube, marketed at children

Go-Gurt (stylized as Go-GURT), also known as Yoplait Tubes in Canada, as Frubes in the UK and Ireland and as Petits Filous Tub's in France, is an American brand of low-fat yogurt for children. It can be sucked out of a tube, instead of being eaten with a spoon. It was introduced by the General Mills-licensed brand Yoplait in 1997, as the first yogurt made specifically for children. It is distributed in the US by General Mills through 2025 (via Yoplait USA), and thereafter by Lactalis' Midwest Yogurt.

== Background ==
Go-Gurt grew out of a late 1990s General Mills project to launch a product called "Fun Cone", with yogurt into a cone-shape package. That project evolved from a cone to yogurt in a flexible plastic tube when a new packaging machine enabled a three-side-sealed tube. This tube is more comfortable in the mouth than four-side-sealed tubes. Don Messer (Packaging Scientist), Scott Gillespie (Packaging Engineer) and Lisa Pannell (Product Development Scientist) led the launch of Go-Gurt in 1998.

Stephen Kaufman of Green Bay, WI, a food scientist, and Jim McGuire, a research and development technician, were credited with the invention while working for General Mills in the late 1980s. Kaufman came up with the idea while he was browsing a women's magazine and saw shampoo sample inserts. Kaufman told the Minneapolis–Saint Paul magazine City Pages that the original conception was for the yogurt to be firm, so the tube would stand straight up—like an ice pop—but when that didn't work out, they shifted toward a creamy yogurt.

This early idea faced internal opposition at General Mills. Kaufman used hotel shampoo pouches as an inspiration to create prototypes of Go-Gurt, which he made himself on a personal-care product pouching machine he rented, to convince General Mills engineers of the idea's worthiness.

Go-Gurt became a side option in McDonald's Happy Meals in 2014 in strawberry flavor.

Anthropologist Susan Squires claims that her ethnographic research in U.S. American families led her client to the development of Go-Gurt.

== Sub-brands ==
In June 2006, frubes Fizzix, a carbonated yogurt snack, was released under the Yoplait brand. This "sparkling yogurt" was originally developed by Lynn Ogden, a professor in the College of Life Sciences at Brigham Young University (BYU), in 1983. Ogden obtained a patent in 1997 and finally found an interested licensor at General Mills in 2006. BYU receives 55% of the royalties, which will go toward BYU's mentoring program and research, while Ogden receives the rest. Fizzix was available in six flavors, but appears to have been discontinued.

In 2005, frubes Smoothie, a drinkable yogurt for children was released. The product currently comes in four flavors: Strawberry Splash, Paradise Punch, Mango Blast, and Wild Berry.

== Internationally ==
Outside of the U.S., Go-Gurt is sold as "Yoplait Tubes" in Canada, as "Frubes" in the United Kingdom (previously as a sub-brand of Petit Filous), and was also sold in Japan as "グルト" ("Guruto"). The name was a play on words, as it evoked the sound of gulping a liquid and incorporated part of the Japanese transliteration of yogurt, ヨーグルト (Yo-Guruto). Go-Gurt was also available in Australia until 2016, where they were known as "Yoplait Go-GURT" or simply "Go-GURT". During its availability another brand available was also in Australia, known as "Yoplait Smackers," aimed at young girls.

== Flavors ==
Generally, each box comes with two different flavors.

- Berry / Cherry
- Fruit Punch / Strawberry-Banana (Canada)
- Melon Berry / Cotton Candy
- Peach / Blueberry (Canada)
- Raspberry / Grape (Canada)
- Strawberry Splash / Berry Blue Blast
- Strawberry / Cherry (Canada)
- Strawberry / Cotton Candy
- Strawberry / Mixed Berry
- Strawberry / Punch
- Strawberry / Vanilla
- Strawberry Banana / Cotton Candy
- Strawberry Banana / Raspberry
- Strawberry Banana / Watermelon
- Strawberry Watermelon / Punch
- Strawberry Kiwi/ Fruit Punch

Single-flavor boxes include:

- Strawberry
- Cotton Candy

=== Special editions ===
- Atlantik (Raspberry+Blackberries) / Pacifik (Mango+Litchi) (Canada only, 2011)
- Go-Gurt Rush: Extreme Red Rush / Crazy Berry Bolt
- Go-Gurt Swirled: Strawberry Milkshake / Banana Split
- iCarly: Cherry / Strawberry
- Scooby-Doo Ro-Gurt: Shaggy's Like Cool Punch / 'Rawberry
- Sour Patch Kids: Red Berry / Blue Raspberry
- SpongeBob SquarePants: Strawberry Riptide / Bikini Bottom Berry
- Strawberry+Melon / Kaki+Lemon (Canada only, 2012)
- Wizards of Waverly Place: Cherry / Blueberry
- Tubes Luminous: Cookie Cream and Caramel (Canada Only)

=== Fizzix ===
- Strawberry Lemonade Jolt / Wild Cherry Zing
- Strawberry Watermelon Rush / Blue Raspberry Rage
- Triple Berry Fusion / Fruit Punch Charge

=== Prehistotubes ===
A limited edition in 2009 had two flavors represented by cave people reminiscent of The Flintstones: Lulutub and Tubôôk.

- Acai (the mascot is Lulutub, a purple-haired woman wearing a black and white dress and a pearl necklace)
- Red bayberry (the mascot is Tubôôk, red-haired man wearing a black and red toga)

=== Twisted ===
- Screamin Green Apple/Strawberry Mango Tango

== Marketing ==
On August 1, 2017, Go-Gurt launched a new campaign titled Kids Never Had It So Easy. The campaign features two "grumpy old fourth graders" bemoaning how easy kids—meaning third graders—have it today.
