= Ultima Foods =

French food company

- Founded: 1993
- Headquarters: Laval, Quebec, Canada
- Brands: Iögo; Olympic Dairy
- Revenue: CA$ 300 million (approx.) (2017)
- Number of employees: 660 (2017)
- Website: ultimayog.ca

Ultima Foods Inc. is a Canadian manufacturer and marketer of yogurt and fresh dairy products. Founded in 1993 (with predecessor operations dating to 1971), Ultima Foods is owned by Lactalis. In 2017, the company had 660 employees across the country and annual sales in excess of CA$300 million.

The company launched the iögo brand of yogurt and fresh dairy products in Canada in mid-August 2012, and also owns and operates the Olympic brand of dairy products. Ultima Foods also continues to manufacture (but no longer directly sells) Yoplait-branded products in Canada.

== History ==
In 1971, the Quebec-based Coopérative agricole de Granby (renamed Agropur in 1979) obtained the Canadian licence to manufacture and market Yoplait products. In 1993, Agropur's yogurt manufacturing and marketing operations were combined with those of Agrifoods, a federal cooperative owned by 2,500 dairy producers in Alberta, British Columbia and Saskatchewan, forming Ultima Foods.

In 2004, Ultima Foods acquired Olympic Dairy, a manufacturer of premium natural cultured dairy, organic and soy products. For over 30 years, Olympic has produced over 140 different products in a variety of sizes and flavours.

On May 8, 2012, Ultima and Yoplait announced they were restructuring their relationship. As of September 1, 2012, General Mills (the brand's longtime United States licensee, and since 2011 a 50% shareholder in the international Yoplait brand) has taken over as the Canadian licensee of the Yoplait brand. Ultima continues to produce Yoplait-branded products at its Granby, Quebec plant, but these products are now marketed and sold by General Mills.

Simultaneously, Ultima Foods announced plans to begin producing and marketing its own brand of yogurt and fresh dairy products in Canada, starting in mid-August 2012, later revealed to be iögo (pronounced "yo-go"). The new product line is, according to Ultima, "entirely created and manufactured in Canada and [includes] a full and original line of products and flavours that suit the tastes of Canadian consumers."

On August 31, 2017, Agropur and Agrifoods announced that they had concluded an agreement pursuant to which Agropur would become the sole owner of Ultima Foods, subject to regulatory approval.

In December 2020, Agropur announced the sale of its yogurt activities in Canada to Lactalis (based in France).
