= Midwest Yogurt =

Dairy company

Midwest Yogurt Inc.
- Trade name: Lactalis Midwest Yogurt; Yoplait USA
- Formerly: Yoplait USA, Inc. (1977-2025)
- Type: Private
- Industry: Dairy products
- Founded: 1977; 49 years ago
- Headquarters: Minnetonka, Minnesota, United States
- Area served: North America (U.S. only)
- Products: Original Yoplait, Go-Gurt, Trix Yogurt, Yo-Plus, Oui by Yoplait
- Revenue: ▲$1.5bn (2025)
- Owner: Besnier family via Lactalis
- Number of employees: 1,000
- Parent: General Mills (1977-2025); Lactalis (since 2025)
- Website: www.midwestyogurt.com

Midwest Yogurt Inc., doing business as Lactalis Midwest Yogurt and Yoplait USA, is an American company specializing in the production of dairy products, sold under various brands of the French company Yoplait, headquartered in Minnetonka, Minnesota. Yoplait USA, Inc. was established in 1977 when General Mills acquired the U.S. operating rights to the Yoplait brand license from the French company of the same name.

When the French cooperative Lactalis acquired General Mills U.S. yogurt business in 2025, including Yoplait USA, the entity was succeeded by Midwest Yogurt, which operated under the name Lactalis Midwest Yogurt.

== History ==
=== General Mills era (1977–2025) ===
The Yoplait brand first entered the United States in 1974 when it was licensed by the Michigan Cottage Cheese Company.

In 1977, General Mills established a separate corporate, Yoplait USA Inc., following acquisition of the U.S. marketing rights to Yoplait from that company, along with the Michigan Cottage Cheese yogurt plant in Reed City, Michigan, still in operation.

Yoplait USA opened a plant in Carson, California, to manufacture Yoplait for the West Coast, where it became the best-selling yogurt brand. In 1981, General Mills began selling Yoplait on the East Coast.

In 2011, Yoplait USA held the No. 1 brand position in the US yogurt market.

=== Lactalis era (2025–present) ===
On June 30, 2025, Lactalis acquired Yoplait USA and other U.S. yogurt brands from General Mills. General Mills yogurt business in the United States contributed approximately $1.2 billion to General Mills' net revenue in 2025.

As a result, Lactalis established Midwest Yogurt in June 2025, with its headquarters in Minnetonka, Minnesota. In July 2025, Lactalis announced plans to invest in the Yoplait plant in Reed City, Michigan.

== Products ==
Under the Yoplait label, General Mills also markets Trix Yogurt, based on the flavors of their breakfast cereal of the same name, and Go-Gurt, where various flavors are packaged in plastic tubes for spoonless eating; these brands are targeted to children. A probiotic line of yogurt is marketed under the brand name Yo-Plus.

As of Autumn, 2023, Original Yoplait states on the package that it contains bio-engineered ingredients, which is corroborated by a general statement on its website.

== Locations ==
Midwest Yogurt has factories in Reed City, Michigan and Murfreesboro, Tennessee.
