= Salt, Sugar, Fat: How the Food Giants Hooked Us =

2013 book by Michael Moss

Salt Sugar Fat
- Author: Michael Moss
- Language: English
- Publisher: Random House
- Publication date: 2013
- Publication place: United States
- ISBN: 978-0-8129-8219-0

Salt Sugar Fat: How the Food Giants Hooked Us is a book by Michael Moss published by Random House in 2013 that won the James Beard Foundation Award for Writing and Literature in 2014. It also was a number one New York Times bestseller in 2013.

In his book, Moss cites examples from Kraft, Coca-Cola, Lunchables, Frito-Lay, Nestlé, Oreos, Capri Sun, and many more companies, where scientists calculate the combination of sugar, fat and salt ("bliss point") for convenience food that is guaranteed to have an optimal appeal for the customer. The "conditioned hypereating" discussed in this book was also previously mentioned in a 2009 book by former FDA director David A. Kessler.
