= Liberté Inc. =

Canadian food producer and distributor

- Company type: Subsidiary
- Industry: Dairy products
- Founded: Montreal, Quebec, Canada (1936)
- Founder: Kaporovsky family
- Headquarters: Saint-Hubert, Longueuil, Quebec, Canada
- Products: Yogurt, milk, cream, kefir, cottage cheese, cream cheese, tofu
- Revenue: ▲ C$ 175 million (2009)
- Number of employees: 664 (2012)
- Parent: Yoplait (Sodiaal)
- Divisions: Western Creamery
- Website: www.liberte.ca

Liberté Inc. is a Canadian producer and distributor of dairy and deli foods, based in the Saint-Hubert borough of Longueuil, Quebec.

== History ==
The current Liberté Inc. is a combination of two previously separate companies: Liberté Brand Products, and the dairy division of Tournevent. These companies were combined under the name of Liberté Natural Foods on July 1, 2006, though the individual brands continue to be used. Besides these brands Liberté also distributes products for several other manufacturers.

At the end of 2010, Pineridge Group sold Liberté Natural Foods to the multinational yogurt producer Yoplait. Liberté Natural Foods was subsequently renamed Liberté Inc. Yoplait is fully owned by French dairy cooperative Sodiaal after General Mills sold its controlling share back to Sodiaal, on 30 November 2021, which General Mills had owned since 2011.

== Products ==
=== Liberté brand products ===
Liberté originally entered the market in 1936 as a manufacturer of cream cheese and cottage cheese based in Montreal, Quebec. In 1964, Liberté expanded its operations and moved its operations to Brossard, Quebec, where they started to manufacture yogurt in addition to their original cheese products. Since then, they have added another production line in Saint-Hyacinthe where they produce a wider variety of products.

=== Western Creamery ===
Western Creamery, which effective September 30, 2019 was sold to Gay Lea, has made and sold cultured dairy products for over 60 years. Its manufacturing facility is in Toronto, Ontario, and its distribution centre in Brampton, Ontario. Western Creamery manufactures yogurts, cream cheese spreads, pressed cottage cheeses, and sour creams. All Western Creamery products are claimed to be made from natural ingredients and are certified kosher.

=== Tournevent ===
Distributed across Canada, Tournevent's products consist of milk, butter, and cheese from goat milk. In 1990, the production facility was expanded and modernized to accommodate several new products, and in 1992, the company introduced a home delivery service called "Tournevent Express".

== Leadership ==
Ben Pearman – Managing Director

Abe Gomel - Owner and President 1976 - 2010
