= Michael Moss =

American journalist and author

Michael Moss is an American journalist, author, and public speaker.

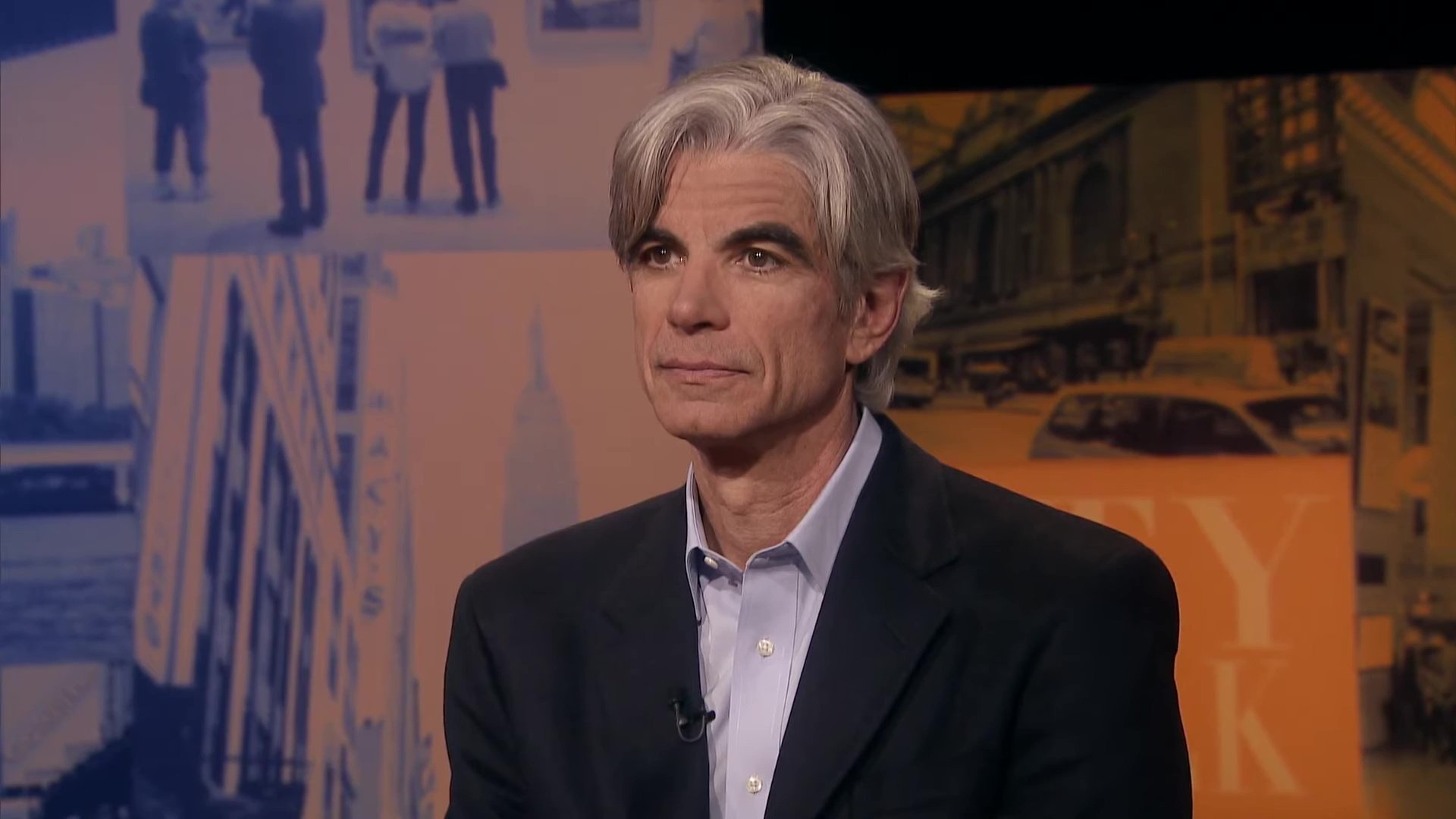
Moss on CUNY TV's City Talk, 2013

He was awarded the Pulitzer Prize for Explanatory Reporting in 2010, and was a finalist for the prize in 2006 and 1999. He is also the recipient of the Gerald Loeb Award for Large Newspapers, an Overseas Press Club citation, and a James Beard Foundation Award for Literary Writing. Before joining The New York Times, he was a reporter for The Wall Street Journal, New York Newsday, The Atlanta Journal-Constitution, The Grand Junction Daily Sentinel and High Country News. His authorships include Salt Sugar Fat: How the Food Giants Hooked Us that was #1 on The New York Times Best Seller list and has been translated into 22 languages. His television appearances include on CBS, CNN, NPR, The Daily Show, and Fox, and he has spoken at more than 60 companies, organizations, and schools including Cornell University, Yale University, Columbia University, Duke University, Nestlé, Bloomberg, the World Health Organization, and the Smithsonian Institution. He has been a fellow of Columbia University's Gannett Center for Media Studies, a fellow of the German Marshall Fund, and an adjunct professor at the Columbia Graduate School of Journalism. He currently lives in Brooklyn with his wife and two sons.

== Bibliography ==
- Hooked: Food, Free Will, and How the Food Giants Exploit Our Addictions, W. H. Allen & Co. (2021) ISBN 978-0753556344, ISBN 0753556340
- Salt Sugar Fat: How the Food Giants Hooked Us, Random House (2013) ISBN 978-0812982190, ISBN 0812982193
- The Extraordinary Science of Addictive Junk Food, The New York Times Magazine (February 20, 2013)
- Palace Coup: The Inside Story of Harry and Leona Helmsley, Doubleday (1989) ISBN 9780385249737, ISBN 038524973X
