= Curd =

Result of curdling milk

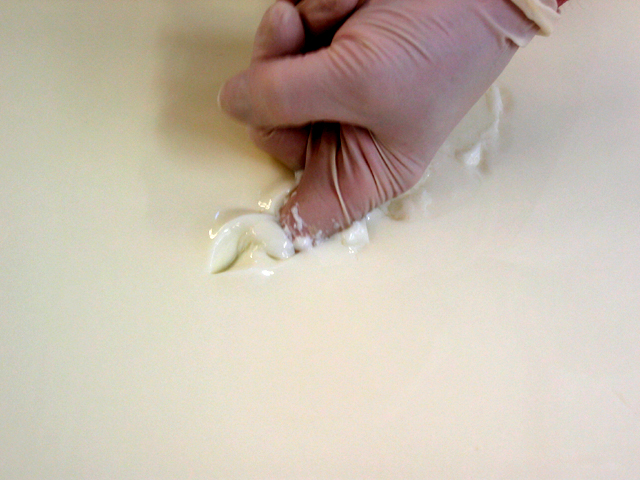
Testing of the setting of cheese curd during the manufacture of cheddar cheese

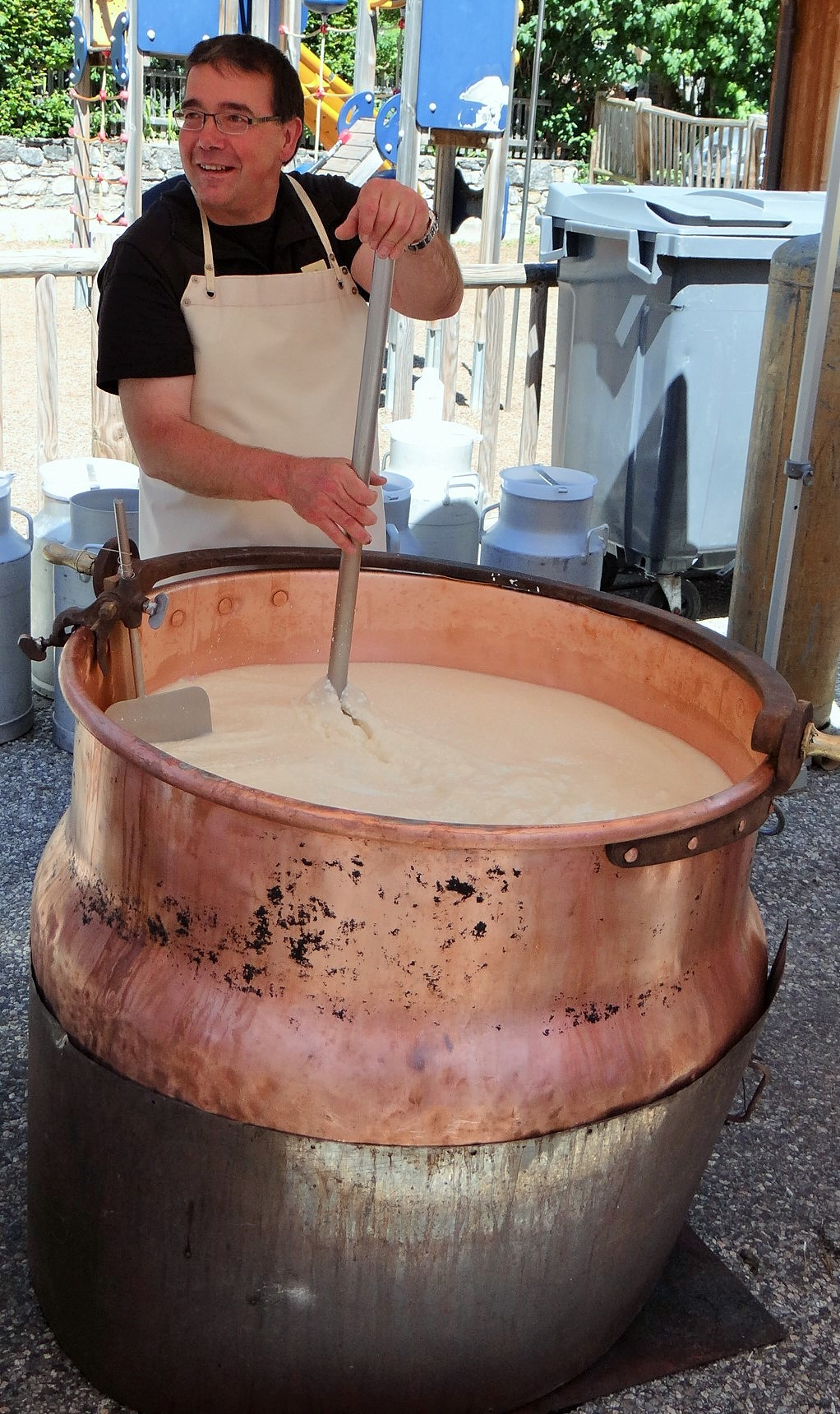
Heating and stirring the curd in the traditional process to make French Beaufort cheese, an Alpine cheese

Curd is obtained by coagulating milk in a sequential process called curdling. It can be a final dairy product or the first stage in cheesemaking. The coagulation can be caused by adding rennet, a culture, or any edible acidic substance such as lemon juice or vinegar, and then allowing it to coagulate. The increased acidity causes the milk proteins (casein) to tangle into solid masses, or curds. Milk that has been left to sour (raw milk alone or pasteurized milk with added lactic acid bacteria) will also automatically produce curds, and sour milk cheeses are produced this way.

Producing cheese curds is one of the first steps in cheesemaking; the curds are pressed and drained to varying amounts for different styles of cheese and different secondary agents (molds for blue cheeses, etc.) are introduced before the desired aging finishes the cheese. The remaining liquid, which contains only whey proteins, is the whey. In cow's milk, 90 percent of the proteins are caseins. Curds can be used in baking or may be consumed as a snack.

== Uses ==
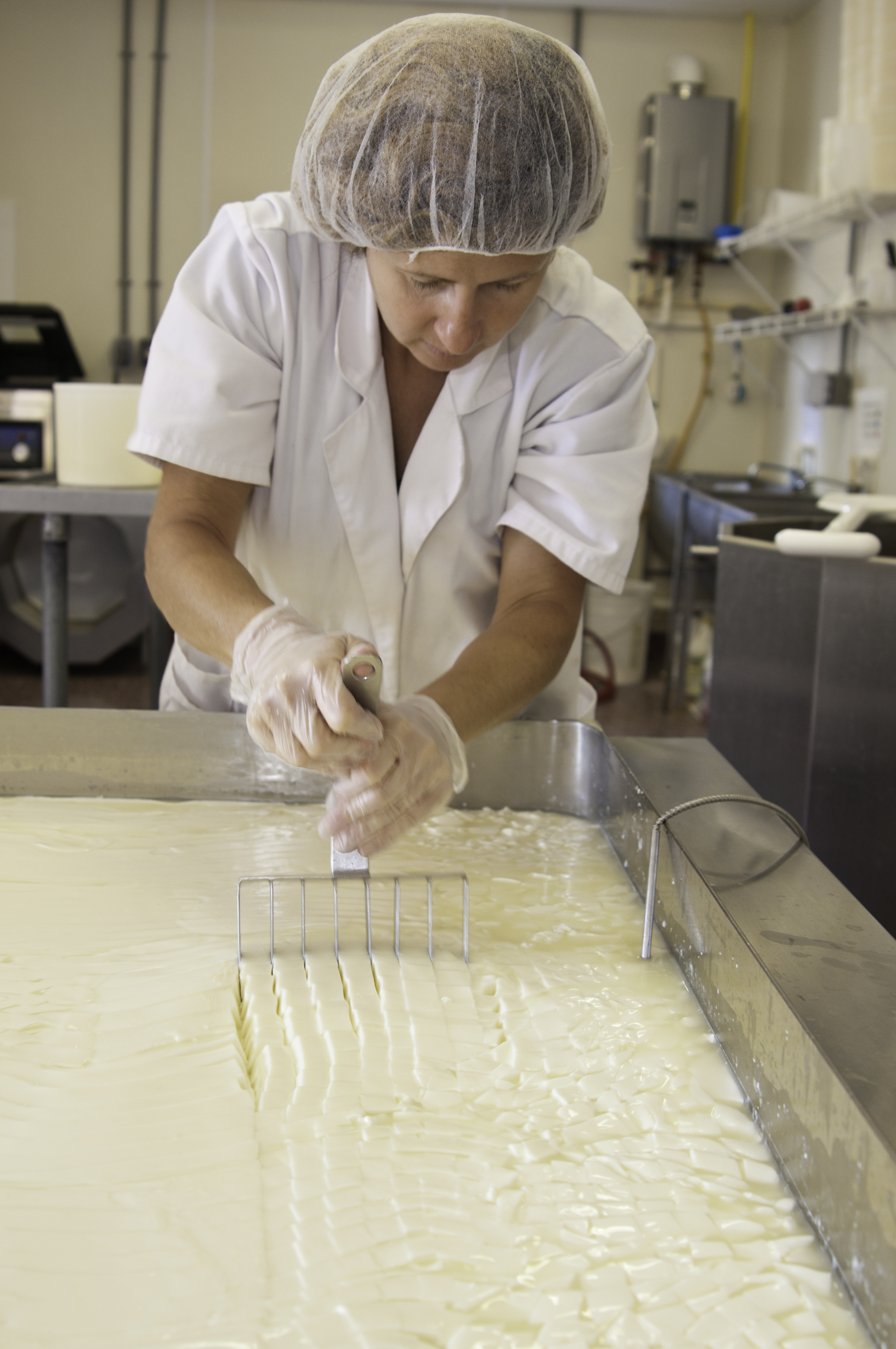
Cutting of milk curd into small cubes using a curd knife

Cheese curds, drained of the whey and served without further processing or aging, are popular in some French-speaking regions of Canada, such as Quebec, parts of Ontario, and Atlantic Canada. These are often sold in snack-sized packaging and seen as a typically Canadian food item. Throughout Canada cheese curds are served with french fries and gravy in a popular snack called poutine.

Curds are also typical of some Germanic-descent regions such as historic Waterloo County in Ontario.

In some parts of the Midwestern U.S., especially in Wisconsin, curds are eaten fresh without further additions, or they are breaded and fried.

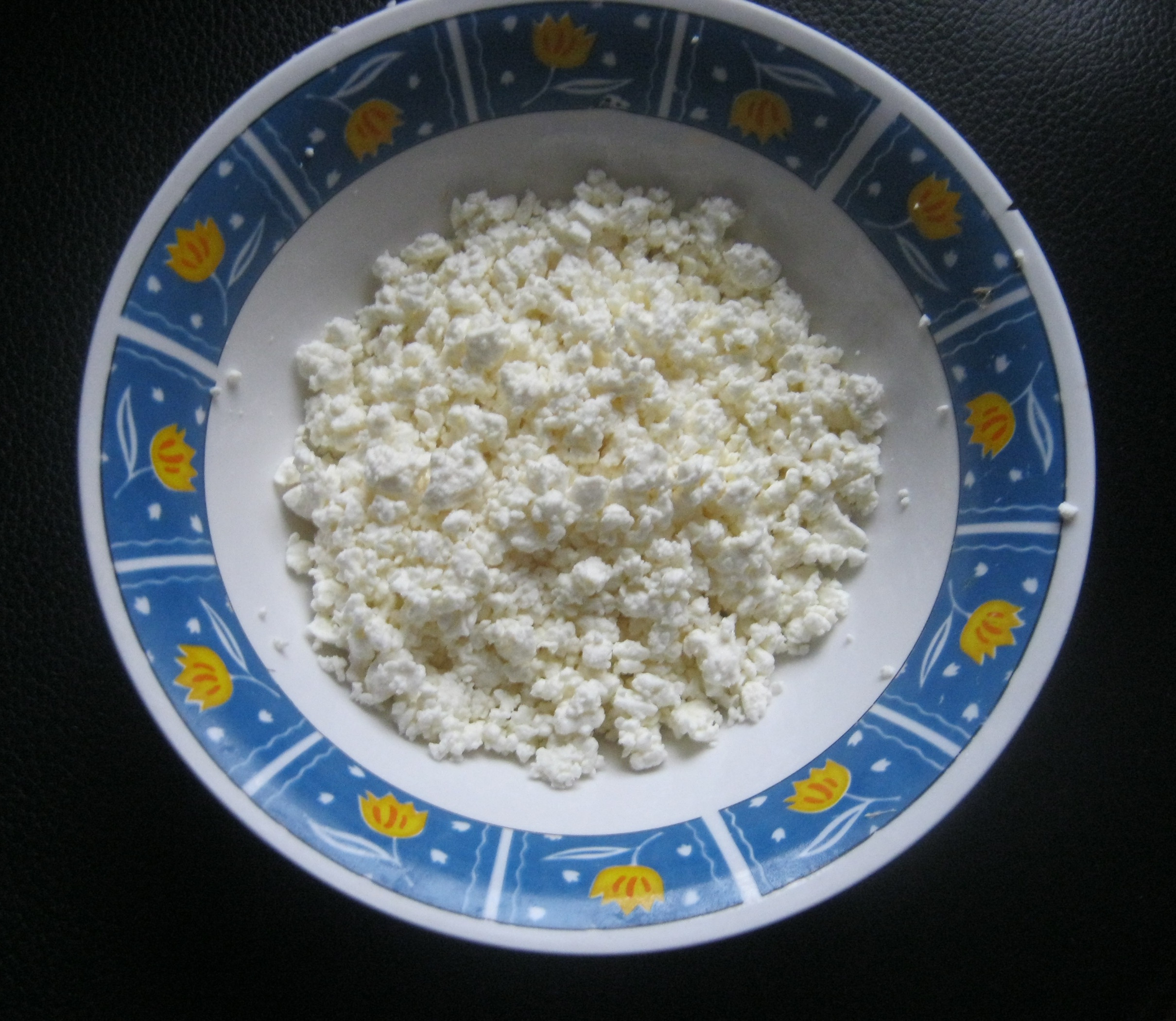
Lithuanian curd

Curd products vary by region and include cottage cheese, curd cheese (both curdled by bacteria and sometimes also rennet), farmer cheese, pot cheese, queso blanco, and paneer. The word can also refer to a non-dairy substance of similar appearance or consistency, though in these cases a modifier or the word 'curdled' is generally used.

In Hungary a form of curds called túró is an ingredient in several national dishes, such as túrós palacsinta, túrós csusza and túrógombóc. In 2019, rögös túró—a form that has a unique texture "consisting of clumps of loose lumps reminiscent of cauliflower" (the name translates to "lumpy túró")—was granted the status of Traditional Speciality Guaranteed (TSG) by the EU.

In Turkey, curds are called keş and are served on fried bread and are also eaten with macaroni in the provinces of Bolu and Zonguldak.

In Sri Lanka, curd is eaten fresh as a dessert since antiquity. Usually buffalo curd cured in clay pots and served with kitul treacle (Caryota urens), is considered a delicacy in almost every part of the island. Although cows milk curd also is produced, Buffalo curd is the preferred variety.

In Nepal, curd is produced by souring pasteurized milk with natural micro-flora. The pasteurized milk is added to a container called theki carved out of wood like Daar(Boehmeria Rugulosa). The milk is left for 12–16 hours and the micro-organisms entrapped within the Theki act as inocula. The curd produced after is used to make chhurpi and variations of it.

Albanian gjiza is made by boiling whey for about 15 minutes and adding vinegar or lemon. The derivative is drained and salted to taste. Gjiza can be served immediately or refrigerated for a couple of days.

In Mexico, chongos zamoranos is a dessert prepared with milk curdled with sugar and cinnamon.

In England, milk treated with rennet is referred to as junket, having a texture similar to pudding or jelly. Junket is a pudding-like dessert decorated with ingredients such as semolina, raisins, chopped nuts and other ingredients. This can be baked, or the curd pudding can be used to bake thin custard pancakes.

== See also ==
- Aarts, Mongolian fermented curd, eaten as a dried snack or reconstituted as a hot beverage
- Chongos zamoranos, a dessert prepared with milk curdled with sugar and cinnamon
- Cuajada (or Coalhada), usually sweetened and eaten for breakfast or dessert, popular in Spain and Central America
- Curd snack, a snack popular in the Baltic states
- Çökelek, a form of fermented buttermilk or yogurt curd from Turkey
- Farmer cheese
- Hoop cheese
- Key lime pie, prepared by curdling condensed milk
- Kesú Paraguay, a Paraguayan formed cottage cheese
- Kurt or Qurut, Central Asian cheese curd
- Leipäjuusto, Finnish cheese
- Ostkaka, Swedish style cheese cake, some call it a Swedish national dish
- Paskha, a Russian Easter dessert made of Tvorog
- Ricotta, an Italian whey cheese
- Skyr, Icelandic curd
- Tofu, the coagulated product from soy milk, from East and Southeast Asian countries.
- Túró Rudi, a Hungarian chocolate bar with curd
- Urdă, a Balkan fresh white cheese made from whey.
- List of dairy products
