= List of Israeli cheeses =

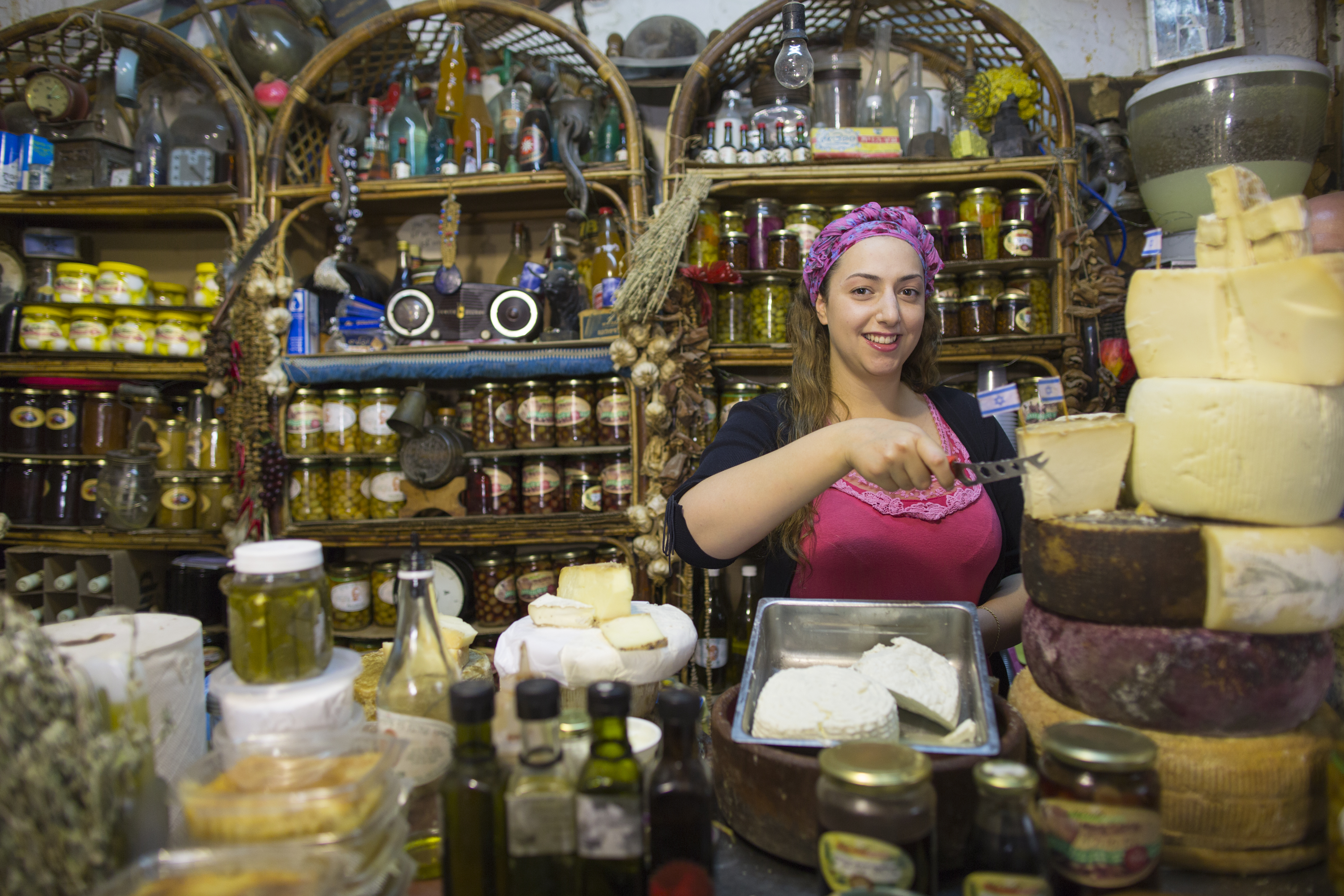
An Israeli cheesemaker in the Galilee.

Cheese in Israel dates back to the Israelites who inhabited Israel in ancient times. In the modern era, many different cheeses are produced in Israel.

== History ==
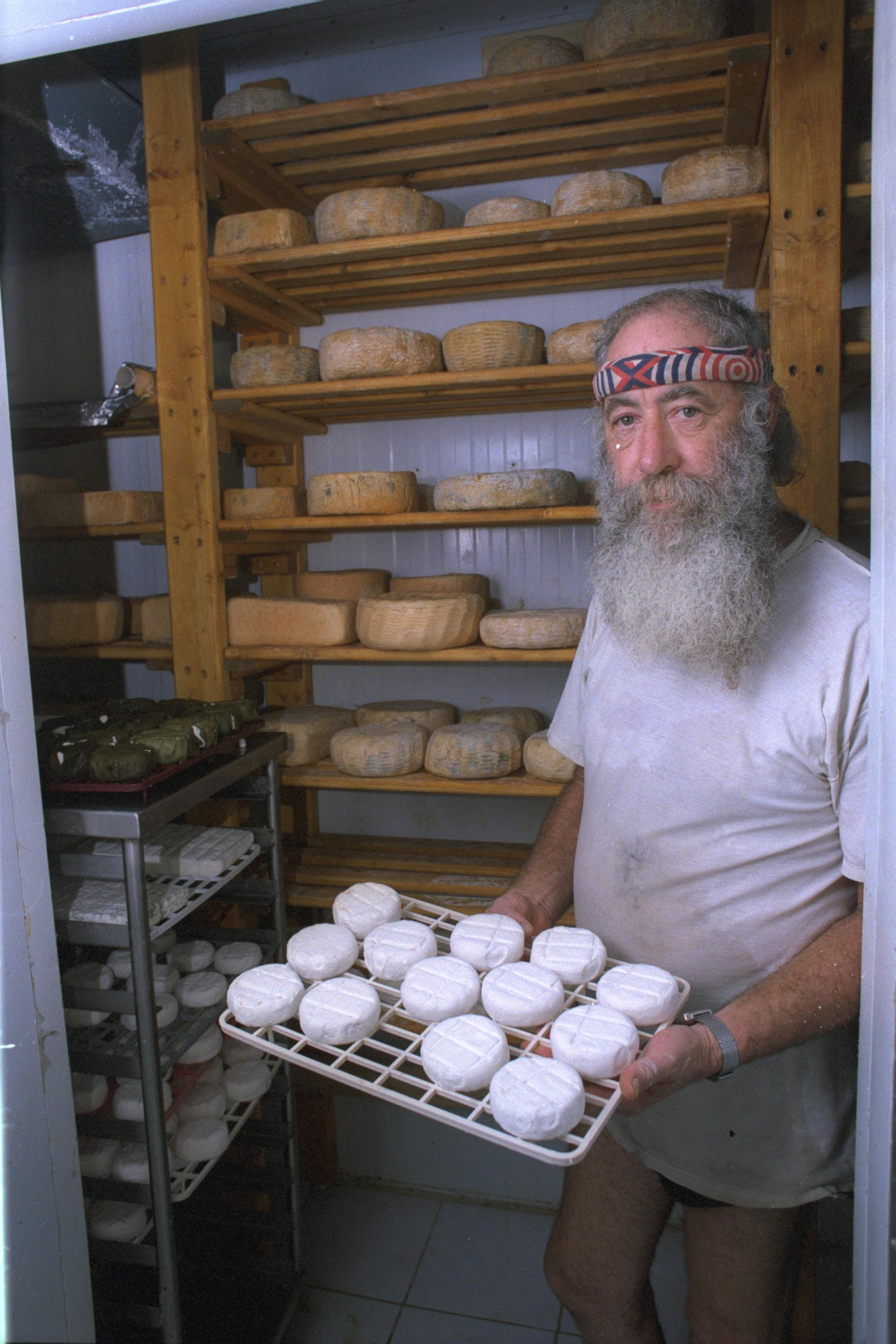
Israeli cheesemaker Shai Zelter with some wheels of his goat cheese.

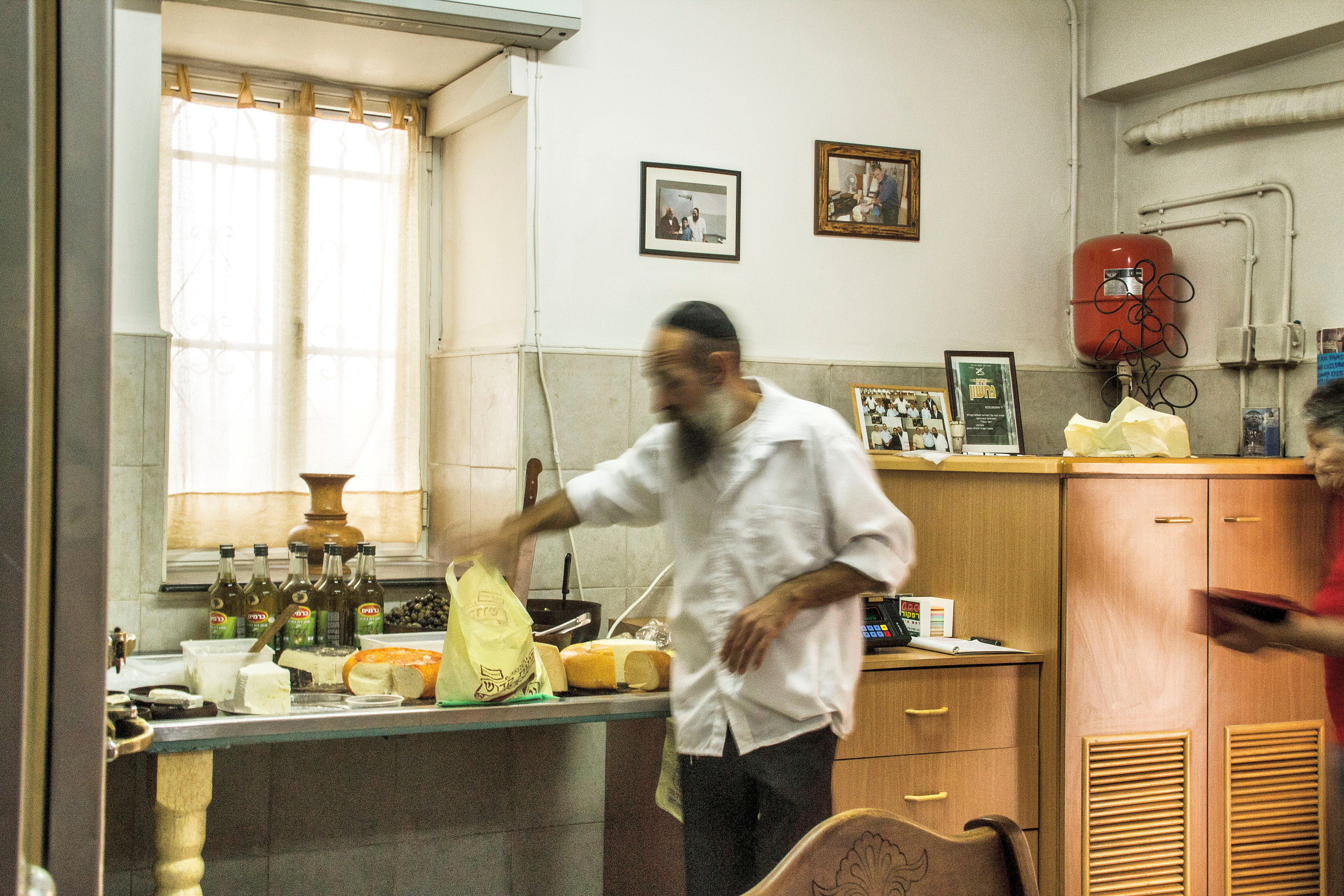
Haredi cheesemaker at the Old Safed Kadosh Dairy.

=== Ancient Israelites ===
The history of cheese in ancient Israel can be traced back to biblical times. Milk and cheese were an important part of the diet of the ancient Israelites, and cheese-making was a common practice among them. The process of making cheese in ancient Israel was similar to that used today. Milk was first heated and then a coagulant, such as rennet, was added to cause the milk to curdle. The curd was then separated from the whey, which was used to make other foods. The cheese was usually formed into balls or cylinders and then stored in a cool place to age. Cheese was often used as a source of protein and was eaten as a snack or added to dishes to give them flavor.

There were several types of cheese that were popular in ancient Israel. One of the most well-known was called "gevinah," which was a soft, white cheese similar to feta. This cheese was made by adding salt and spices to the curd before it was shaped and aged. Another popular cheese was "marvad," which was a harder cheese that was similar to Parmesan. This cheese was made by pressing the curd and then aging it for several months. Ancient Israel was so active in cheese-making that the Jewish historian Josephus wrote that the ravine which separated Mount Moriah from Mount Zion in Jerusalem was dubbed the "Valley of the Cheese Makers" by locals.

Cheese was also an important part of religious ceremonies in ancient Israel. It was often used as an offering to the gods and was also served during religious festivals and feasts. In the Jewish tradition, cheese is still an important part of the celebration of Shavuot, which commemorates the giving of the Torah on Mount Sinai. It is customary to eat dairy foods, including cheese, on this holiday. Cheese has been an important part of the diet and culture of the ancient Israelites for thousands of years. Cheese-making was a common practice, and several types of cheese were popular, including soft white cheese and hard, aged cheese. Cheese was also used in religious ceremonies, and it continues to play an important role in Jewish tradition today.

=== 1800s to present ===
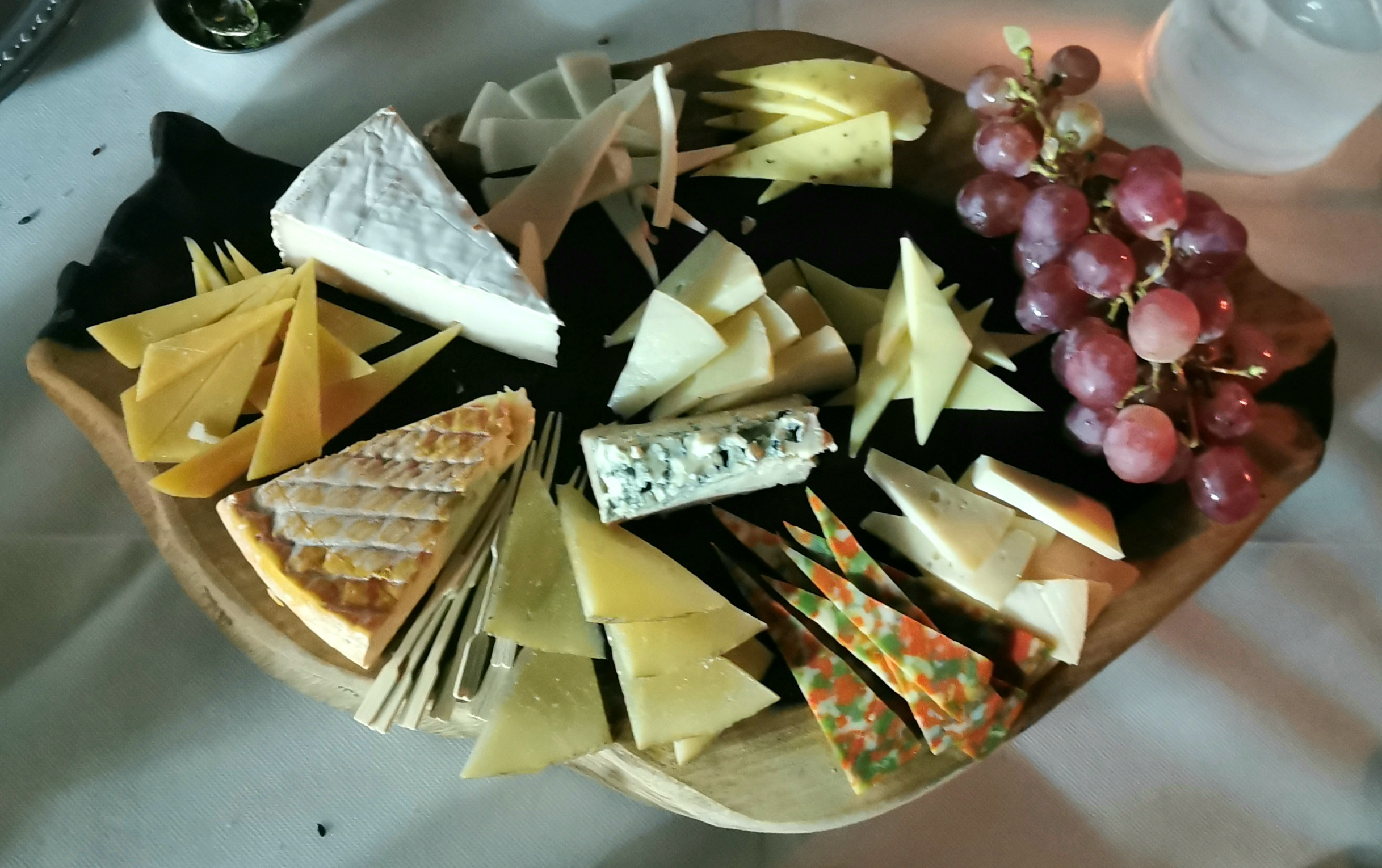
A variety of Israeli cheeses.

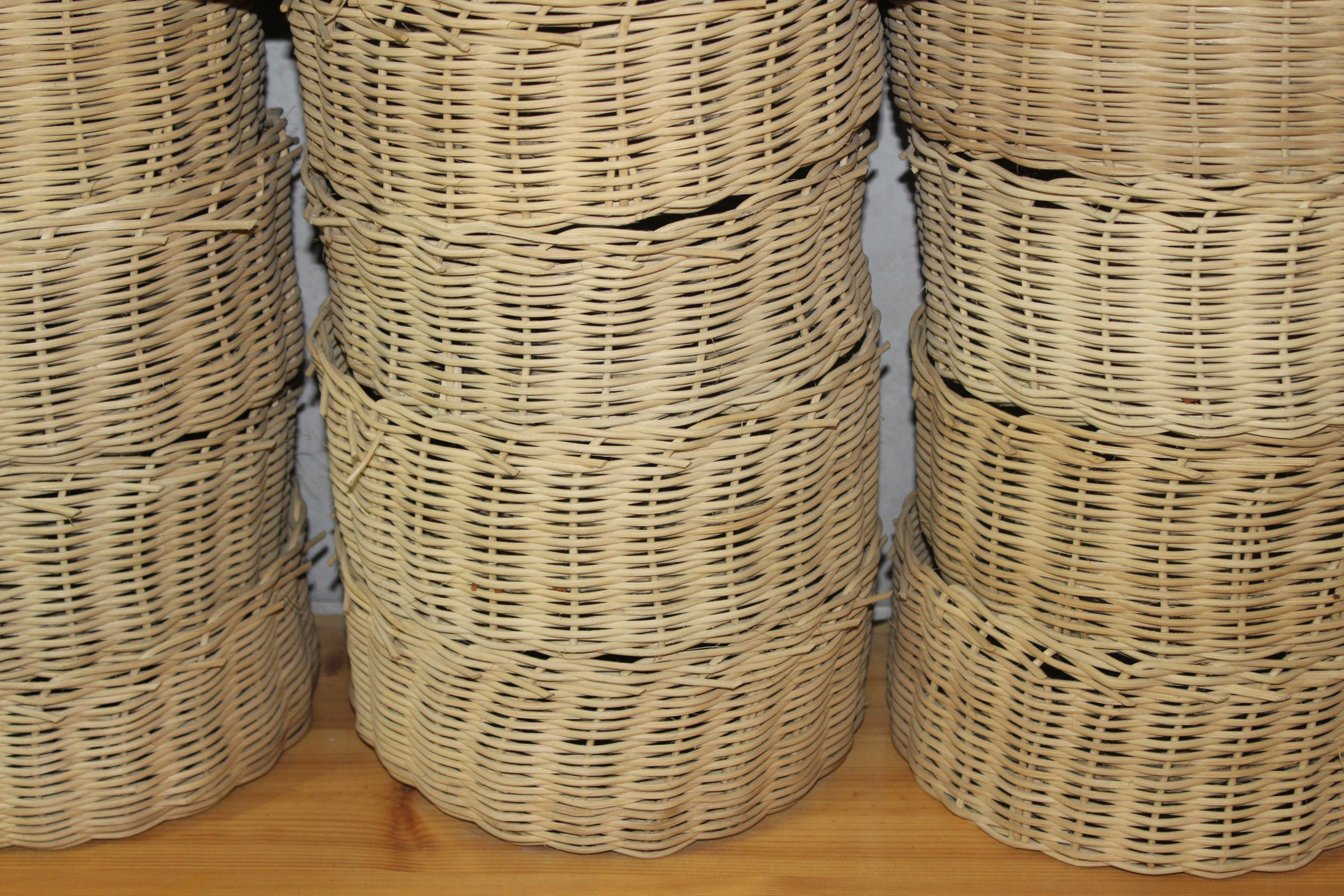
Straw baskets used traditionally in the production of Tzfatit

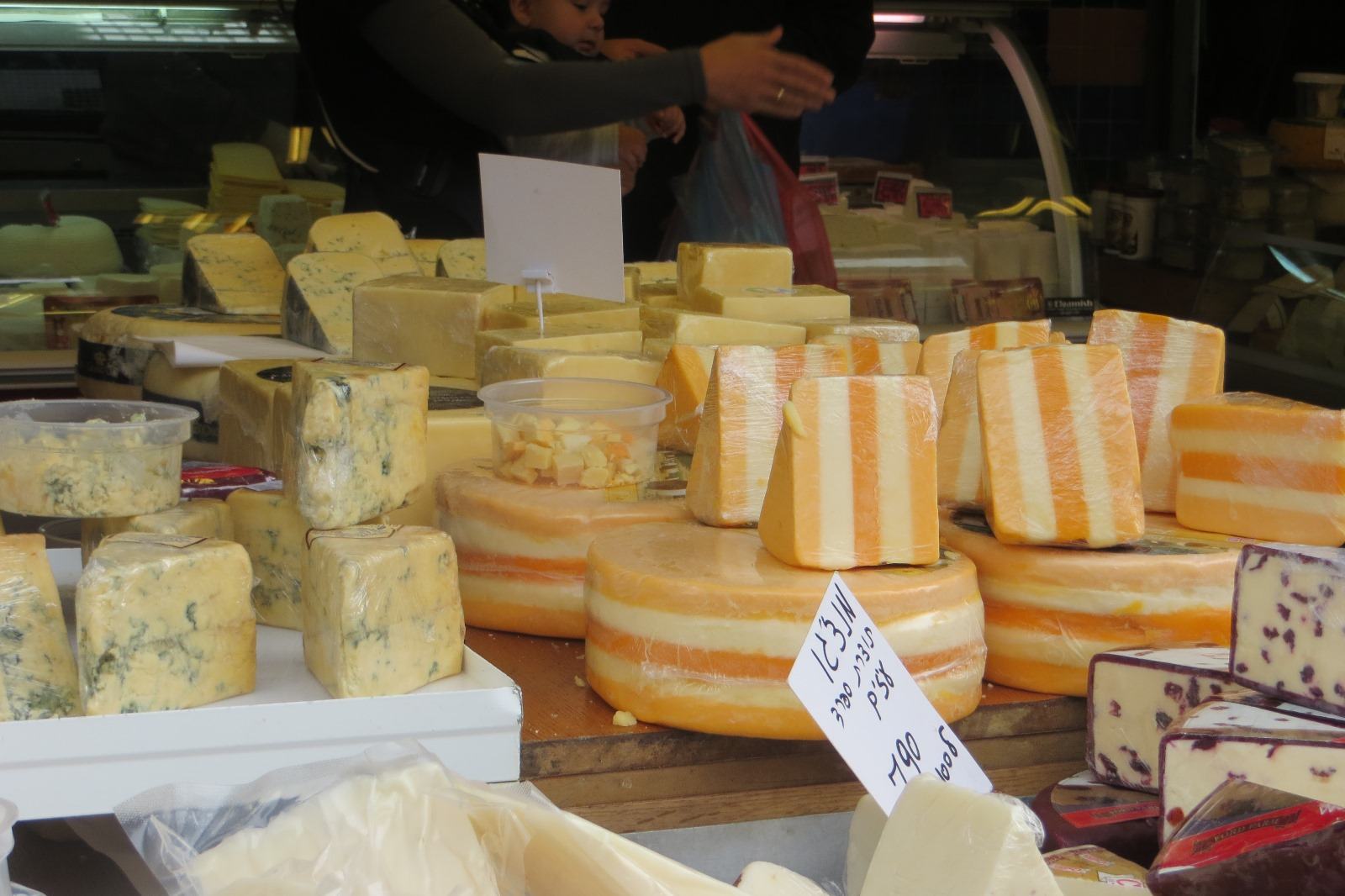
Cheeses for sale at the Carmel Market in Tel Aviv.

The well known Tzfatit, or Tzfat cheese, a semi-hard salty sheep's milk cheese was first produced in Safed (Tzfat in Hebrew) in 1840 and is still produced there by descendants of the original cheese makers. Tzfatit began to be produced in 1818 at HaMeiri Dairy, established in the home of Meir Arzoni (later HaMeiri), who immigrated from Persia. Tzfatit is a mild curd cheese molded in a basket that gives the cheese distinctive circular striations.

Though the Middle East is considered to be the birthplace of cheese, the development of gourmet artisanal cheese industry in modern Israel has been slower than that of its European and North American counterparts. The success of dairy farming in Israel was unexpected and considered a crowning achievement for the country since it wasn't believed that cows could thrive in Israel's harsh, mostly desert climate. Two main types of cheese, yellow or white, were the usual cheeses consumed by Israelites until recently. In the 1980s, due to the moderate increase in Israel's security and stability, as well as a growing economy and the standard of living starting to improve as a result of Israel transitioning from a developing country to a developed country, and a socialist economy to a free market based economy, around this time, as well the impact of international tourism, privately owned dairies began producing a vast variety of high quality handmade cheeses from cow, goat and sheep's milk. Gilboa cheese is a kosher sheep's milk cheese originating from the Gilboa Mountains in Israel. It is often compared to Manchego cheese, Gilboa has a slightly lemony flavor compared to a Spanish Manchego. This is however a different cheese than the very popular cheese sold as Gilboa in Israel which is made from cow milk and suitable for toasts. Another kosher Israeli cheese of note is Kadurim Rolled Chevre, which is made of fresh goat cheese and rolled with such flavors as sesame seeds, Herbs de Provence, cracked black pepper, sun-dried tomato, and raspberry.

== Varieties ==
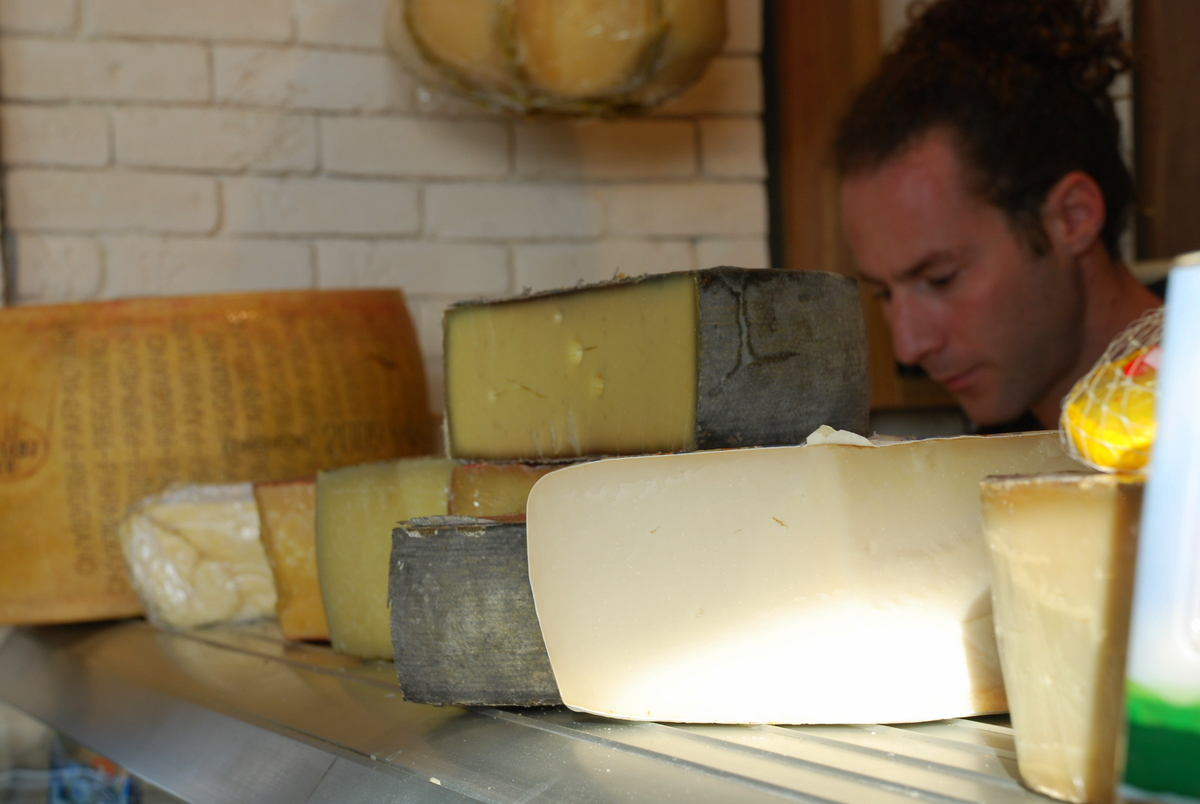
Cheese shop in Israel.

In addition to the cheeses listed below, there are many other types of cheese that are produced in Israel. These include goat cheese, blue cheese, brie, and camembert, among others. Many of these cheeses are produced by small-scale artisanal producers and are available in specialty shops or at local markets.

=== Gvina levana ===
Gvina levana is a soft spreadable cheese that is slightly similar to cream cheese and quark cheese, and is used as a spread on bread, dip, and most commonly as an integral ingredient in Israeli cheesecake.

=== Labneh ===
Labneh is a soft, creamy cheese that's commonly consumed throughout the Middle East, including in Israel. It is made from strained yogurt and has a tangy, slightly sour flavor and a thick, spreadable texture. Labneh is often served as a dip or spread, accompanied by fresh herbs, olives, or other toppings.

=== Tzfatit ===
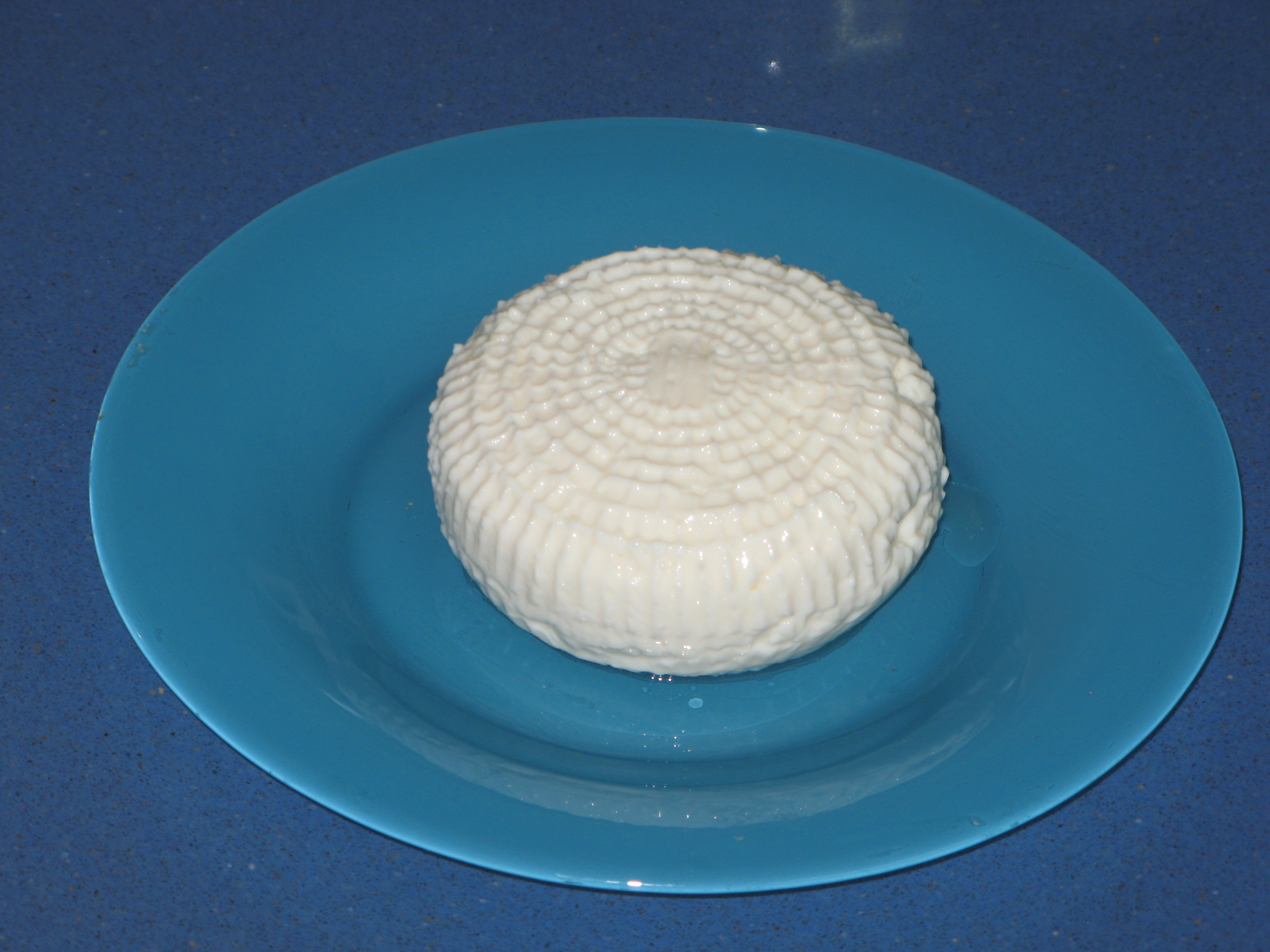
A small wheel of Tzfatit

Tzfatit is a white, crumbly cheese made from goat or sheep milk that originates from the city of Safed in the Galilee region of Israel. It has a similar texture to feta but has a milder, sweeter flavor. Tzfatit is often used as a topping for salads, bread or crackers, or as a filling for pastries.

=== Halloumi ===
Halloumi is a semi-hard, salty cheese that is traditionally made from sheep or goat milk. This cheese originated from Cyprus, but has gained popularity in Israel and it is produced locally in Israel by several companies. It has a unique texture that is both chewy and creamy, and a flavor that is slightly tangy and nutty. Halloumi is often grilled or fried and served as a side dish or topping for sandwiches and salads.

=== Akkawi ===
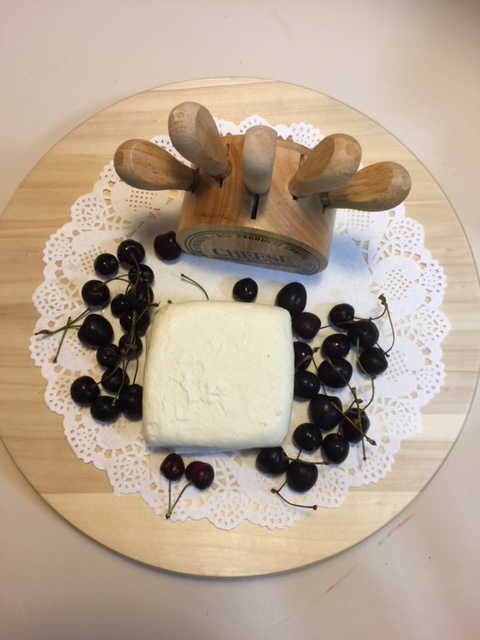
Akkawi cheese served with cherries.

Akkawi is a soft, white cheese originating from the Israeli port city of Akko, and popular among Arab Israelis that is made from cow or goat milk. It has a mild, slightly salty flavor and a smooth, creamy texture that makes it ideal for spreading on bread or crackers. Akkawi is also commonly used as a filling for pastries such as manakish or fatayer.

=== Bulgarit ===
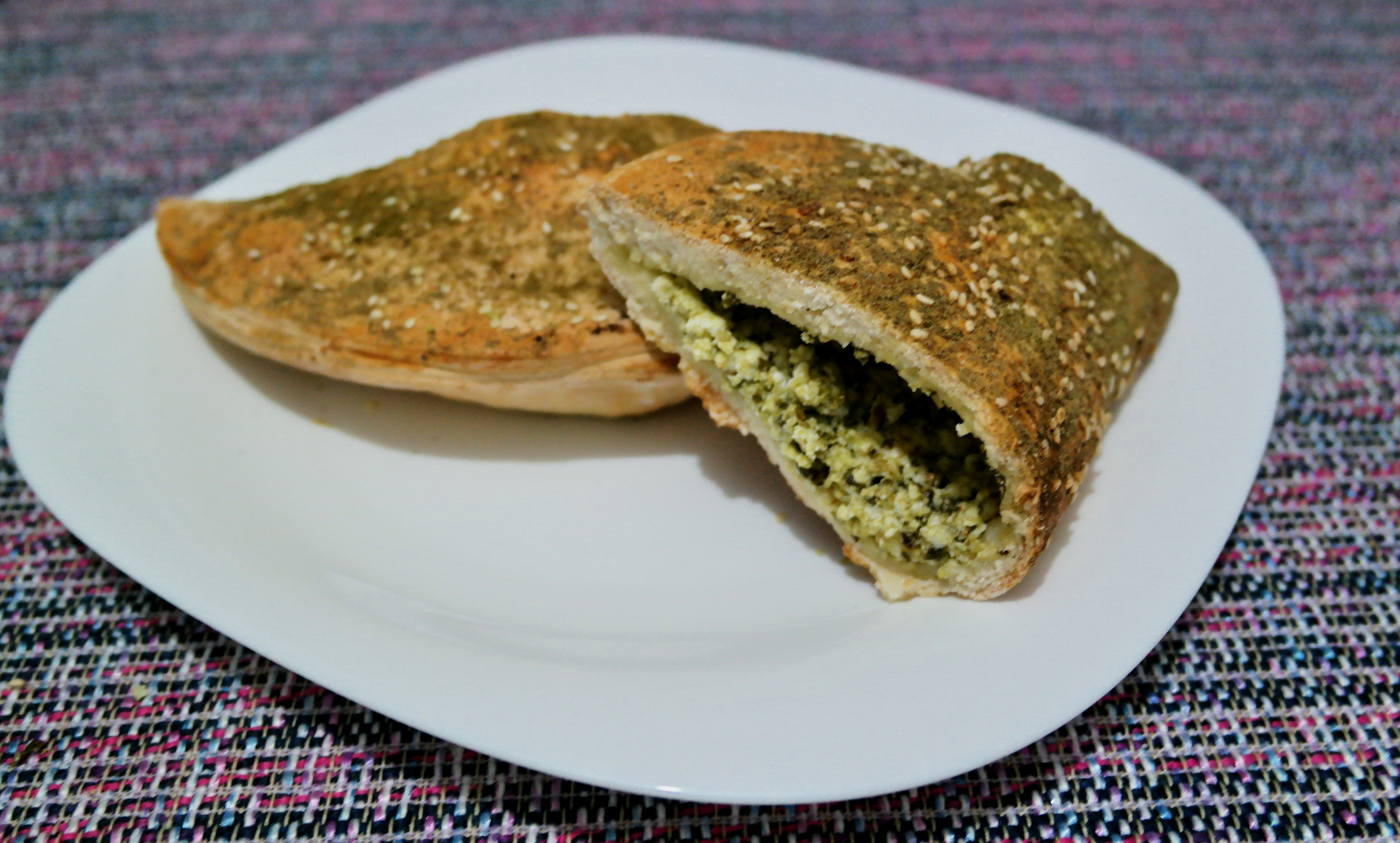
Sambusak filled with bulgarit cheese.

Bulgarit, or Bulgarian cheese is a white, crumbly cheese that is made from sheep milk. It is different than the Bulgarian sirene, Bulgarit is a cheese originating from the Bulgarian Jews, who brought it to Israel and traditionally used it in a variety of dishes such as bourekas. Bulgarit is a tangy, slightly salty flavor and a texture that is similar to feta cheese. Bulgarit is one of the most popular cheeses of Israel today, and is often used in the filling of bourekas, sambusak and similar dishes, as well as an ingredient in salads or as a topping for bread, crackers or even watermelon.

=== Kefir cheese ===
Kefir cheese is a soft, creamy cheese that is made from kefir, a fermented milk drink. It has a tangy, slightly sour flavor and a spreadable texture. It is often used as a dip or spread and is a popular addition to breakfast dishes.

=== Kashkaval ===
Kashkaval is a semi-hard, yellow cheese that is made from cow milk. It has a mild, slightly nutty flavor and a smooth, elastic texture. Kashkaval is often grated or melted and used as a topping for pizza or as a filling for sandwiches.

=== Kasseri ===
Kasseri is a semi-hard, yellow cheese that is made from sheep milk originally from Greece. It was brought to Israel by Greek Jews, and is now made by several companies locally. It has a nutty, slightly sweet flavor and a crumbly texture. Kasseri is often used as a topping for salads, pizza, or other dishes.

=== Galil ===
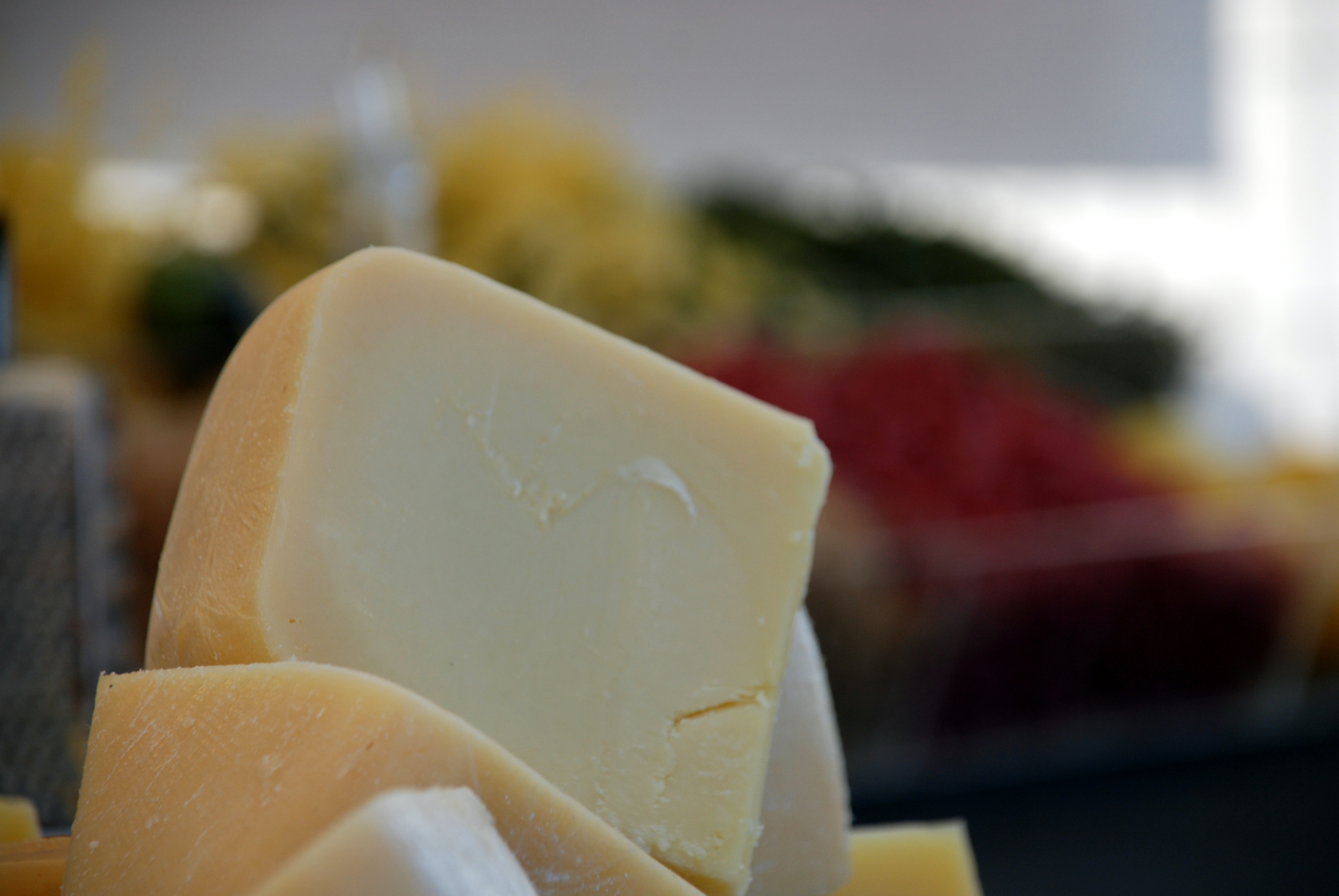
A wedge of Galil cheese.

Galil cheese is a semi-hard, yellow cheese that is made from cow milk. It has a nutty, slightly sweet flavor and a smooth, creamy texture. Galil cheese is often used as a topping for pizza or as a filling for sandwiches.

=== Jibneh Arabieh ===
Jibneh Arabieh is a white, crumbly cheese that is made from goat or sheep milk. It is commonly made in the Galilee in the north of Israel as well as in the Negev Desert in the south of Israel. It has a tangy, slightly salty flavor and a texture that is similar to feta cheese. Jibneh Arabieh is often used in salads or as a topping for bread or crackers.

== See also ==
- List of cheeses
