= Kadmi =

Kadmi may refer to:

- Kadmi or Qadimi, variant of the Zoroastrian calendar
- Kadmi Cohen, Jewish French writer
- Alternate transliteration for Kedmi

== See also ==
- Kadimi
