= Cottage cheese boycott =

2011 Israeli consumer boycott

A consumer boycott of cottage cheese began in Israel in June 2011. The protest was against the continuing rise of food prices in Israel. The organizers called on the public via Facebook to stop buying cottage cheese, which is often perceived as a basic food item in Israel. Within a short time, 100,000 users joined the Facebook protest page. As the boycott gained momentum, it sparked a public debate on the high cost of living in Israel.

Despite special sales campaigns designed to tempt shoppers, supermarket chains reported a sharp drop in the purchase of cottage cheese by Israel's three leading dairies, and the price of cottage cheese in the country was lowered.

== History ==
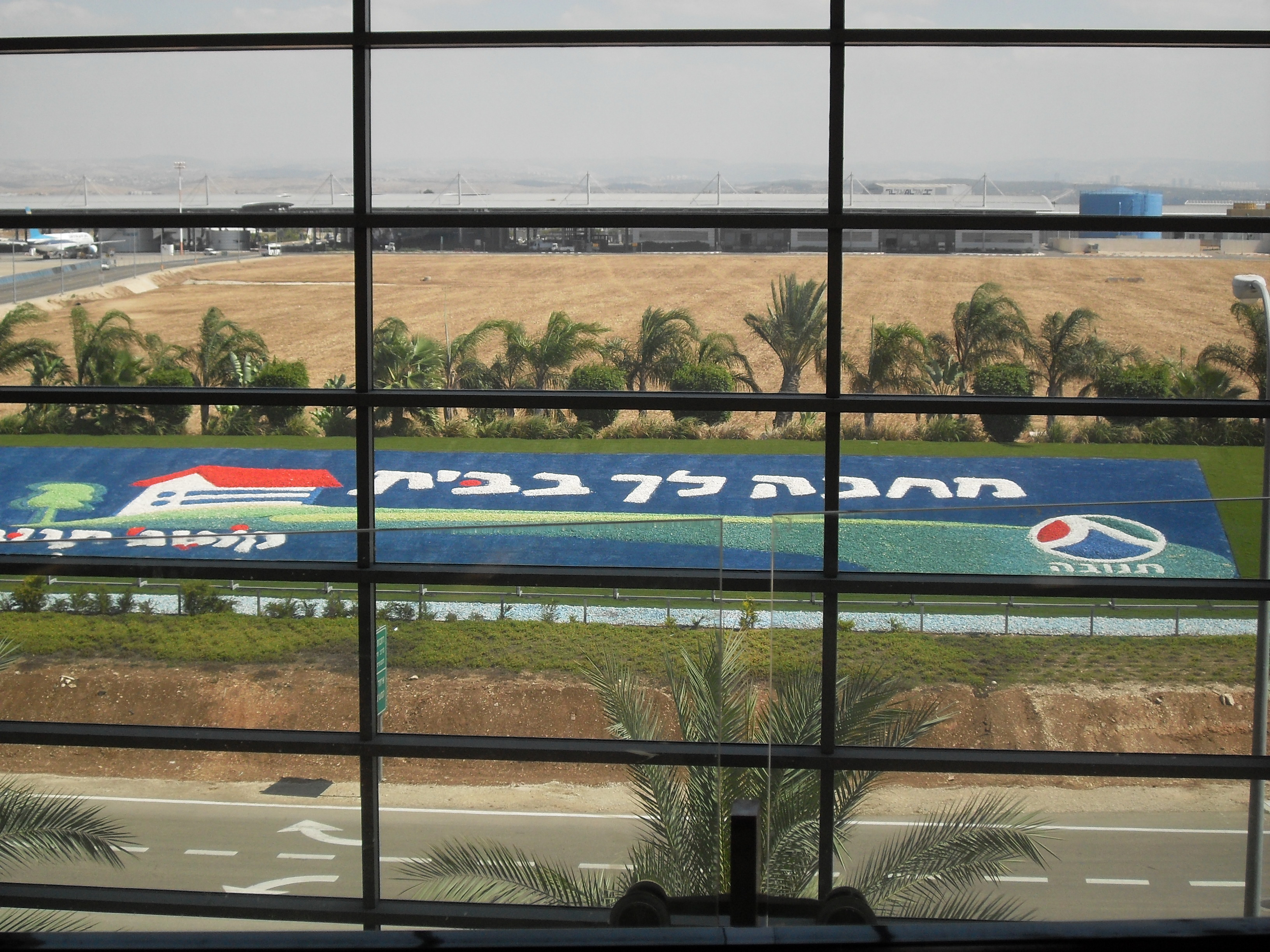
Tnuva cottage cheese advertisement, Ben-Gurion International Airport

Cottage cheese is a popular commodity in Israel which is widely perceived as a basic food item by the Israeli public. The Tnuva cooperative controls more than 70% of the dairy market, while the companies Strauss and Tara control the rest of the market. In addition, importation of dairy products into Israel before the boycott was minimal due to the extremely high import duties imposed on them, with duties for some dairy imports standing over 100%. Due to Tnuva's dominance of the Israeli dairy market, it is considered a legal monopoly by the Israel Antitrust Authority, which has the power to regulate its prices to prevent it from price gouging. In August 2008, Israeli Finance Minister Avraham Hirschson declared that the government would stop regulating the price of cottage cheese, which stood at 4.82 NIS for a 250 ml (9-ounce) tub, in order to encourage competition in this market. Contrary to the expectations, within three years the price of cottage cheese rose by about 45% of the original price, up to approximately 8 NIS.

According to the Israeli financial newspaper Globes, the price hike that led to the boycott was imposed due to a demand on Tnuva's executives by British Apax Partners, a London-based private equity fund that had bought a controlling interest in the Israeli Tnuva, to raise the company's value. After Tnuva had been acquired by Apax, its executives were ordered to present a 100-day plan to increase the company's value, which was nicknamed "Quick Wins", in accordance with Apax's policy of purchasing companies, increase their value, and selling them within six years. Apax then hired McKinsey & Company, an American consulting firm, to examine Tnuva's pricing capabilities. McKinsey, along with Dr. Shula Pesach (Tnuva's head economist) conducted a study, and concluded that Tnuva could increase prices by at least 15% without harming public demand, although Dr. Pesach warned that the price hike had the potential to "blow up in the company's face." Sources in Tnuva told Globes that "Even before the rise in raw milk inputs, it was clear that Tnuva was going to continuously raise prices."

== The protest ==
Following a series of articles by Ilanit Chaim in Globes in June 2011 that covered the surge in food prices and cost of living in Israel, Bnei Brak resident Itzik Alrov opened a protest group on Facebook calling on the Israeli public to stop buying cottage cheese as a first step. Although the boycott was planned for July 1, 2011, there had already been much publicity in the media. With tens of thousands of Facebook users joining the protest group, the total soon passed 100,000. As a result, the boycott was moved up to mid-June 2011. The public was urged to purchase cottage cheese only if it cost less than 5 NIS, and to boycott other dairy products as well.

In September 2011, a NIS 125 million class action lawsuit was filed against Tnuva alleging that the company "abused its position to raise cottage cheese prices by more than 40% between 2006 and 2011." The Israel Antitrust Authority also opened an investigation into Tnuva over alleged abuse of monopoly power.

After the CEO (Zehavit Cohen) of the Israeli branch of Apax Partners announced that it would not lower the price of cottage cheese, other Facebook protest groups were established calling to boycott all of Tnuva's products.

== Government response ==
As a result of the public protest, the opposition parties initiated a debate on the matter in the Knesset. Finance Minister Yuval Steinitz and Prime Minister Benjamin Netanyahu announced that they would consider importing dairy products to create competition in the Israeli dairy market. In addition, the Israeli minister of finance announced that the price of dairy products, which is regulated by the government, would continue to be regulated. State Comptroller Micha Lindenstrauss announced that he would investigate the rising cost of dairy products. Knesset Speaker Reuven Rivlin attacked the Tnuva cooperative when he stated, "You purchase a domestic product, but the money goes abroad."

The Kedmi Committee appointed to study the issue found that the profit margin of retail chains was the main cause for the price rises, followed by the margin of the large dairy manufacturers. Israeli dairy farmers were the least to blame. Following the recommendations of the committee, the Minister of Finance signed a bill to reduce customs on the import of hard cheeses. Israeli dairy farmers, who considered themselves likely to sustain the most damage from the implementation of the new reduced customs bill, began protesting against it. In February 2014, Israeli Economy Minister Naftali Bennett lowered import duties on a variety of dairy products such as butter and yogurt by 80%, although these reduced tariffs came with quotas to help small Israeli companies increase their share in the market and encourage competition.

On December 30, 2013, the Israeli government imposed price controls on Tnuva, forcing the prices of dairy products to go down by about 20%. This decision had been preceded by an investigation of the market by an accountant hired by the government, which found that Tnuva's prices were "excessive and unreasonable".

== Response of chain stores and dairies ==
The Israeli retail chain stores reported that sales dropped dramatically following the cottage protest and as a result several retail chains announced that they would significantly reduce the retail price of cottage cheese and cream cheese.

After many days in which the milk cooperatives kept silent, Ofra Strauss, Chairperson of Strauss Group, stated: "We were wrong. The cost of food is too high" and added that "the difference between high-tech and consumer products is that we cannot ignore what is happening to people". The next day, Zehavit Cohen, CEO of Tnuva, announced that Tnuva would not raise the price of dairy products until the end of the year, but it would not lower the price either. Five days later, Tnuva caved in and lowered the prices by about 12.5%, to 5.90 NIS per carton. The protest organizers claimed that the price was still too high and the boycott would continue until it dropped to 5 NIS. Shortly thereafter, all milk cooperatives announced that they would lower cottage cheese prices. The "Blue Square" supermarkets network, which operates the "Mega" supermarket chain, announced a 10 percent cut in basic commodities. The Shufersal supermarket chain announced that it would sell cottage cheese for 5.9 NIS.

Due to the cottage cheese protests, two other Israeli companies, Soglowek and Osem, said they would suspend planned price increases for their products.

== Research ==
Hendel, Lach and Spiegel (2017) studied the cottage boycott econometrically. They found that (i) demand for cottage cheese dropped by 30% because of the boycott; (ii) brand loyalty diminished, and customers became more price sensitive and willing to substitute across brands; and (iii) the increase in prices sensitivity was more pronounced in areas with more usage of social media; these findings suggests that social media played an important role in facilitating consumer mobilization; and (iv) post‐boycott prices were substantially below the profit maximizing levels (as implied by the post‐boycott demand elasticities), suggesting that firms restrained their pricing policies, most likely because they were concerned with the boycott spreading to other products and with the increased likelihood of government intervention due to high prices.

== See also ==
- Israel Dairy Board
- 2011 Israeli housing protests
- Olim L'Berlin
- List of protests in the 21st century

== Literature ==
- Yossi Spiegel. Antitrust Enforcement of the Prohibition of Excessive Prices: The Israeli Experience. 3.3. The Cottage Cheese Class Action Case // Excessive Pricing and Competition Law Enforcement / eds. Yannis Katsoulacos, Frédéric Jenny. — Cham: Springer International Publishing, 2018. — P. 127–158. — ISBN 9783319928319. — DOI:10.1007/978-3-319-92831-9 5.
- Shay Hershkovitz. “Not Buying Cottage Cheese”: Motivations for Consumer Protest — the Case of the 2011 Protest in Israel // Journal of Consumer Policy. — 2017. — December (vol. 40, iss. 4). — P. 473–484. — ISSN 0168-7034. — DOI:10.1007/s10603-017-9340-5.
- Hendel, I., Lach, S. and Spiegel, Y. (2017), Consumers' activism: the cottage cheese boycott. The RAND Journal of Economics, 48: 972–1003. -DOI:10.1111/1756-2171.12212.
