= 2011 Israeli middle class protests =

2011 Israeli middle class protests may refer to:

- The cottage cheese boycott – a massive consumer boycott held in Israel in June 2011
- 2011 Israeli social justice protests – a series of demonstrations in Israel beginning in July 2011
