= Bagel toast =

Toasted bagel with vegetables and cheese

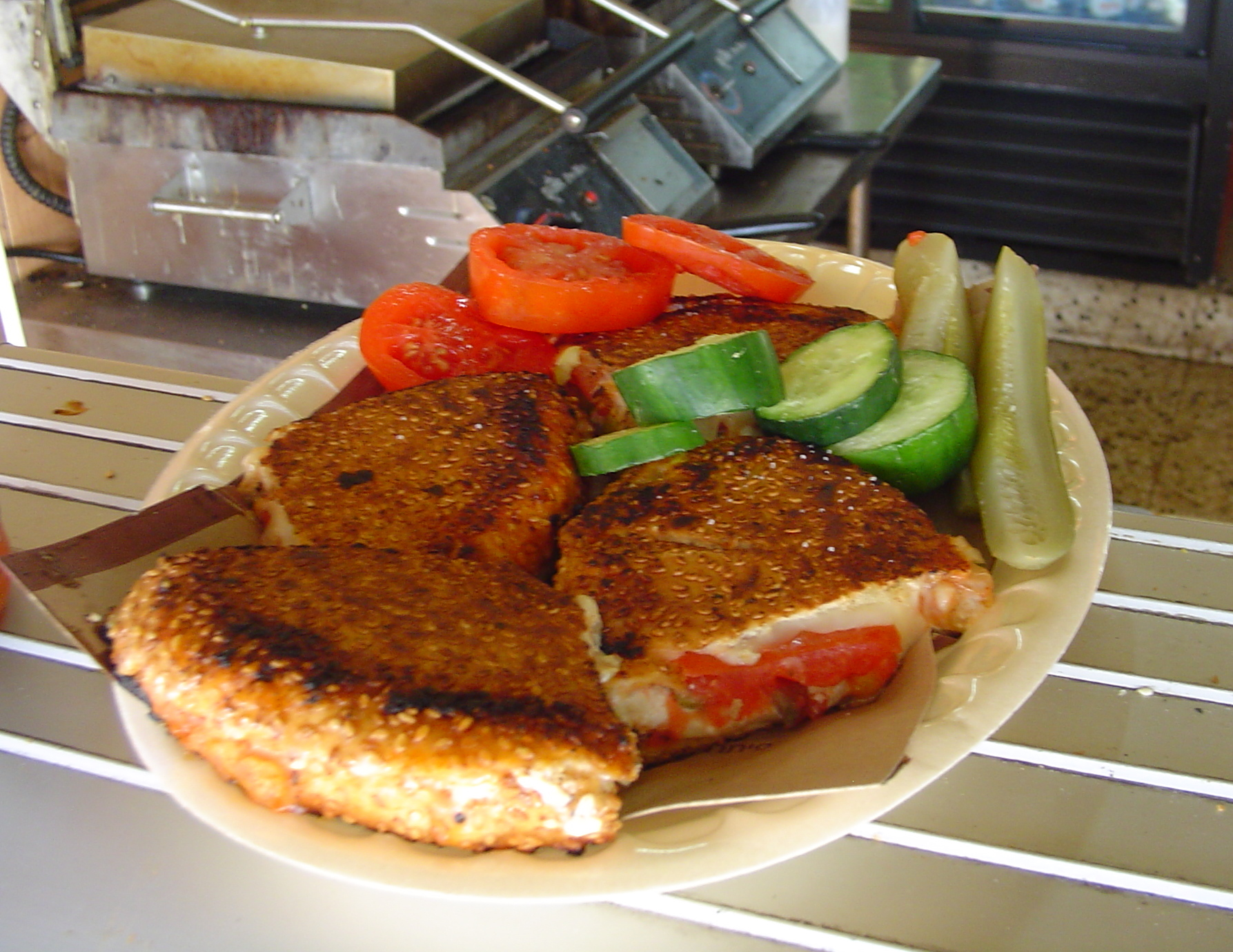
- Type: Sandwich
- Place of origin: Israel
- Main ingredients: Bagel, vegetables, cheese such as gvina levana, galil cheese, tzfatit

Bagel toast (Hebrew: בייגל טוסט, romanized: Beygel Tost) is a sandwich commonly eaten in Israel. It is composed of a pressed, toasted bagel filled with vegetables and cheese and is grilled on a sandwich toaster or panini press. While the bagel is round with a hole in the center, it is unlike the typical American bagel in that it is made from a different dough with sesame seeds. Common fillings include tzfatit, feta, gvina levana, or galil cheese, along with green olives, corn, tomatoes, onions, and dressing. It is sometimes served with pizza or chili sauce.

Bagel toast is typically found in cafes or coffee houses in Israel and is also served as a casual snack in the home. At the famous Abulafia Bakery, in Jaffa, Tel Aviv, Israel, bagel toast is served with a side of za'atar – a mixture of sumac, sesame seeds and herbs.

== See also ==
- Bagel and cream cheese
- List of sandwiches
- List of toast dishes
- Ka'ak
