= Tost =

Tost may refer to:

- David Tost (David Origanus, 1588-1628), German astronomer from Silesia
- Two one-sided tests, a kind of equivalence test
- Tost, German exonym for Toszek, a town in Silesia, Poland
- Bagel toast
- "Tost", an Irish poem by Seán Ó Ríordáin
