= Kedmi =

Kedmi (Hebrew: קדמי) is a Jewish surname. It is an adjectival surname literally meaning "the one from the East" in Biblical Hebrew. Notable people with the surname include:

- Shani Kedmi (born 1977), Israeli Olympic sailor
- Sharon Kedmi, Israeli official, head of the Kedmi Committee
- Yaakov Kedmi (born 1947), Russian-Israeli politician and diplomat
- Yaakov Kedmi (judge) (1930–2016), Israeli Supreme Court Judge, head of Kedmi Commission

== See also ==
- Kedem (disambiguation)
