= Pot cheese =

Type of cheese

Pot cheese is a type of soft, crumbly, unaged cheese. It is very simple to make and also highly versatile, making it a very popular cheese, but it may be hard to find in stores. It is traditionally cut with a sun-shaped object known as a cheese cutter.

Pot cheese is in the midway stage between cottage cheese and farmer cheese. It is somewhat dry and crumbly, but with a neutral, creamy texture and is very high in protein. It is most similar to Mexican queso blanco.

In New York and its environs, it was frequently served in a bowl topped with cut-up vegetables.

In Austria, Topfen (pot cheese) is another name for Quark.

== See also ==
- Hoop cheese
