= Israel Dairy Board =

Israeli dairy management

Israel Dairy Board (Hebrew: מועצת החלב, Mo'etzet HeHalav) plans and coordinates the management of dairy farming in the State of Israel.

== History ==
The Israel Dairy Board was registered as a limited company in November 1965. It was established by the Israeli Cabinet to make decisions essential for proper functioning of the country's dairy industry. It serves as an umbrella organization for all parties involved in producing dairy products in Israel: the Israeli government (which passes regulations), the farmers' organizations, the cattle farmers, and the dairies.

The Israel Dairy Board is a " Public Benefit Company " whose full name is "The Council for the Dairy Industry in Israel (Production and Marketing)" which was registered as a limited company in November 1965. This company was established according to the Israeli government's decision, as a body within which the essential agreements for the proper functioning of the dairy industry in Israel. Therefore, since its inception, the council has served as an umbrella organization shared by all the parties involved in the production of milk and its products in Israel. This includes: the Israeli government (which deals with regulation in the field), the farmers' and cattle breeders' organizations, and the dairies.

In practice, the council is regularly involved in planning and coordinating the management of the dairy industry in Israel along with information on the importance of dairy products

== See also ==
- Agriculture in Israel
- The Cottage cheese boycott
