= Gvina levana =

Spreadable Israeli cheese from cow's milk

- Country of origin: Israel
- Source of milk: Cow milk
- Pasteurised: yes
- Texture: Soft, spreadable
- Aging time: none

Gvina levana (Hebrew: גבינה לבנה), which means "white cheese" in Hebrew, also known as Israeli white cheese, is a soft, creamy, and tangy cheese that is popular in Israel. The cheese is made from cow's milk and has a texture similar to sour cream, but is less sour and less tangy. It is used in a variety of dishes in Israeli cuisine and is an important part of Israeli culture.

== Origins ==
According to food journalist Janna Gur and others, the cheese was likely brought to Israel from Germany by Templers, who called it Weißkäse. Although the original recipes called for pig rennet, the food was approved by Rabbi Issar Yehuda Unterman as kosher because it is such a minute ingredient in the final product.

Gvina levana is considered an important part of Israeli culture, and often eaten on Shavuot.

== Description ==
The cheese is of a loose, spreadable consistency, less dense than cream cheese; it can be eaten with a spoon. It is unripened and similar to a quark. The cheese is generally produced in 5% and 9% fat versions, but also in a 1/2% version.

== Uses ==
Gvina levana is a versatile cheese that can be used in a variety of dishes both sweet and savory. It is often used as a spread on bread or crackers, and it can also be used as a topping for salads or vegetables. In addition, gvina levana is a key ingredient in many Israeli dishes, such as Israeli cheesecake and quiche. It occasionally is added to dough or cake batter instead of yogurt or sour cream. Gvina levana may be eaten as part of an Israeli breakfast.

== See also ==
- List of Israeli cheeses
- Cream cheese
