= Tara (Israel) =

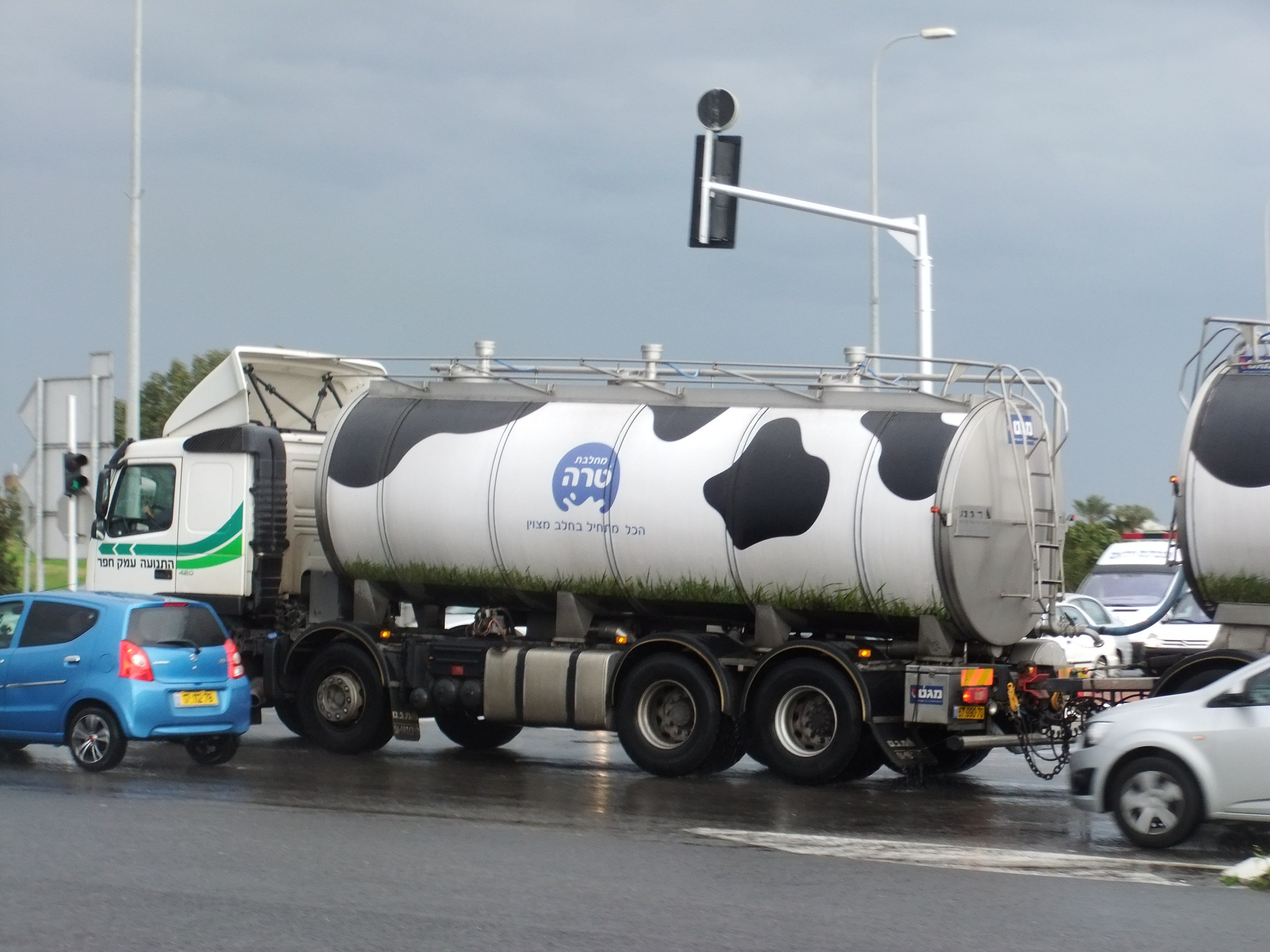
Tara milk truck

Tara (Hebrew: טרה) is an agricultural cooperative (co-op) in Israel specializing in milk and dairy products. It is the second largest dairy processor after Tnuva.

== History ==
Tara was created in 1942 by dairy farmers from the Tel Aviv neighbourhood of Nahalat Yitzhak and the surrounding area, in order to unite under one organization that would represent them with regard to the British mandatory authorities and concentrated purchasing of fodder rations as well as selling the agricultural produce. The name apparently was decided by the British clerk when the co-op representative came to register the firm did not have a name. A warehouse for fodder as well as a refrigeration room to keep milk on the Shabbat was built on a half-dunam (500 m²) plot of land. The increase in productivity as well as quantities of milk provided a surplus that led the co-op to begin producing cream and cheeses.

With the establishment of the State of Israel, a dairy department was created in the new Ministry of Agriculture, and with it new regulations with regard to production including required pasteurization, a standard 3.5% level of fat, and that dairy farmers work from concentrated areas and independently. This led to more dairy farmers to join from Giv'atayim, Jaffa, and Petah Tikva as well as production expanding to hard cheeses.

At the beginning of the 1960s, during the period that Moshe Dayan was Minister of Agriculture, the government decided to change the zoning of the Nahalat Yitzhak neighbourhood from agricultural to urban-industrial. Subsequently, the local farmers were forced to move their enterprises elsewhere. The elimination of its main source of milk required Tara to purchase milk from new farmers as well as Tnuva.

Until the late 1990s, Tara was still run by representatives of the original owners. In 1997, it was decided to hire 'professional' management. In 2004, the Central Bottling Company Ltd., the local licensee of Coca-Cola, purchased the company for $39 million.

In 2006, Tara signed a licensing and know-how deal with Müller of a European dairy product manufacturer based in Germany.

As of 2006, Tara employs over 360 workers and produces about 135 million liters of milk yearly, which is about 450,000 liters of milk daily on average, with a market share of 10-13%. Estimated revenues in 2005 were 500 million NIS, with a loss of about $10 million.

In August 2007, the Gilead Dairy owned by Tara, acquired Tzuriel Farm for under NIS 20 million. The 'Tzuriel Farm' dairy, specializing in hard-cheese, goat-cheeses, and other semi-firm cheeses was established in 1986 and since 1999 has operated a unique line of soy-based products.

== See also ==
- Economy of Israel
