= Tzfatit =

Semi-hard cheese produced in Israel originally from sheep's milk

Tzfat Cheese
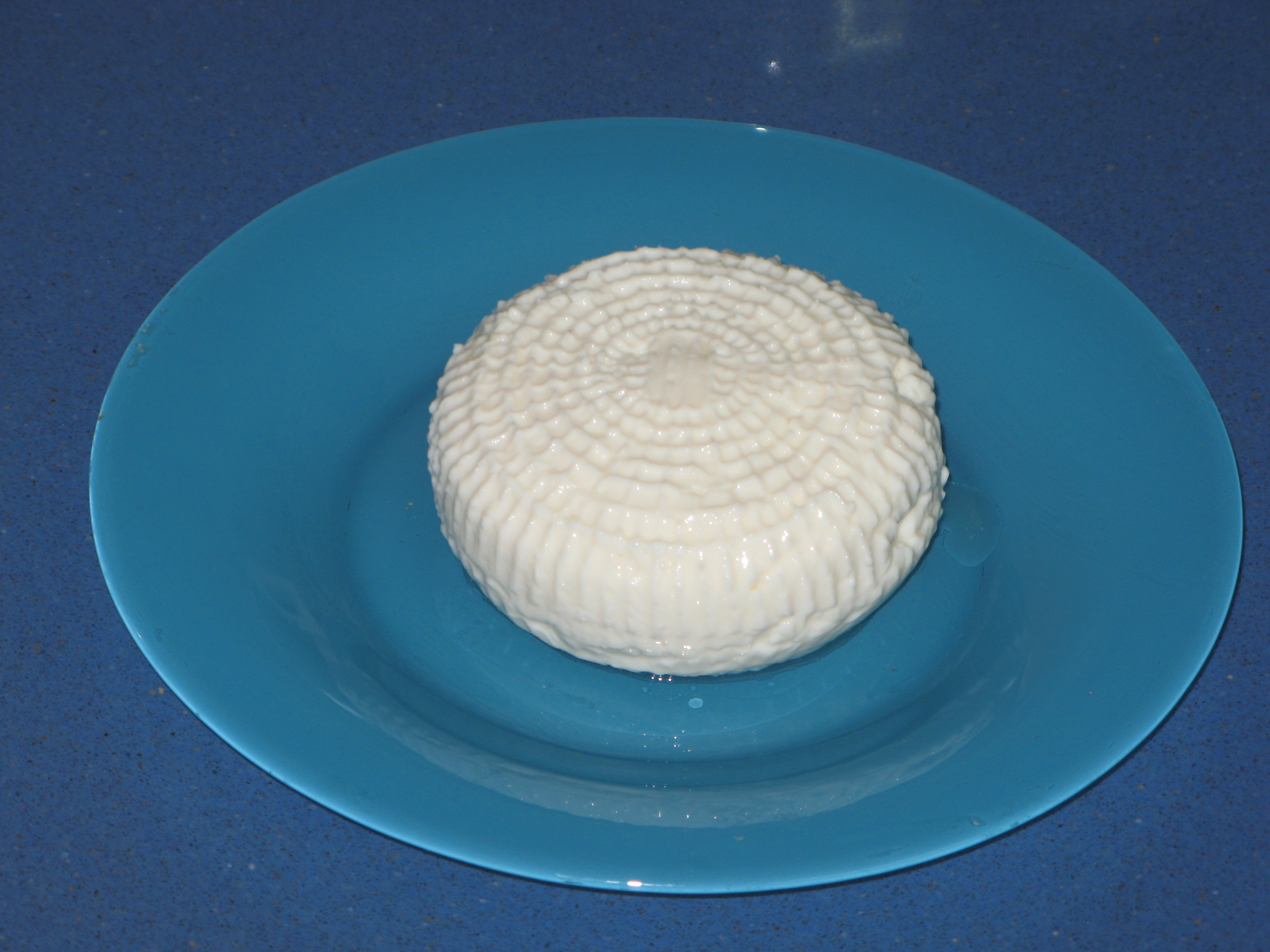
- Country of origin: Israel
- Region: Upper Galilee
- Town: Safed (Tzfat)
- Source of milk: Sheep (original version), Cow, Goat, Water Buffalo
- Texture: Semi-hard fresh and hard aged
- Aging time: 3 to 12 months

Tzfatit, or Tzfat cheese (Hebrew: גבינה צפתית, gvina tsfattit) is a semi-hard salty cheese produced in Israel, originally from sheep's milk. It was first produced in the Jewish community of Safed (Tzfat in Hebrew) in 1840 and is still produced there by descendants of the original cheese makers.

== History ==
The cheese was first produced around 1840 at HaMeiri Dairy, established in the home of Meir Arzoni (later HaMeiri), who immigrated to the Holy Land from Qajar, Iran. Gvina Tzfatit is a mild curd cheese molded in a basket that gives the cheese distinctive circular striations. The cheese has an elastic texture and low fat content. The milk is pasteurized at a low 72 °C (162 °F), which preserves the food proteins. Trimming is mainly based on the action of enzymes contained in a special ferment and on calcium chloride rather than on the action of lactic acid. The fermentation is quick, about an hour. After most of the whey is separated, the cheese is stored in straw or plastic baskets for several hours to drain the remaining whey and form its round shape. For the remainder of the draining time, the cheese is inverted several times to help the draining and to form the basket's pattern on all sides.

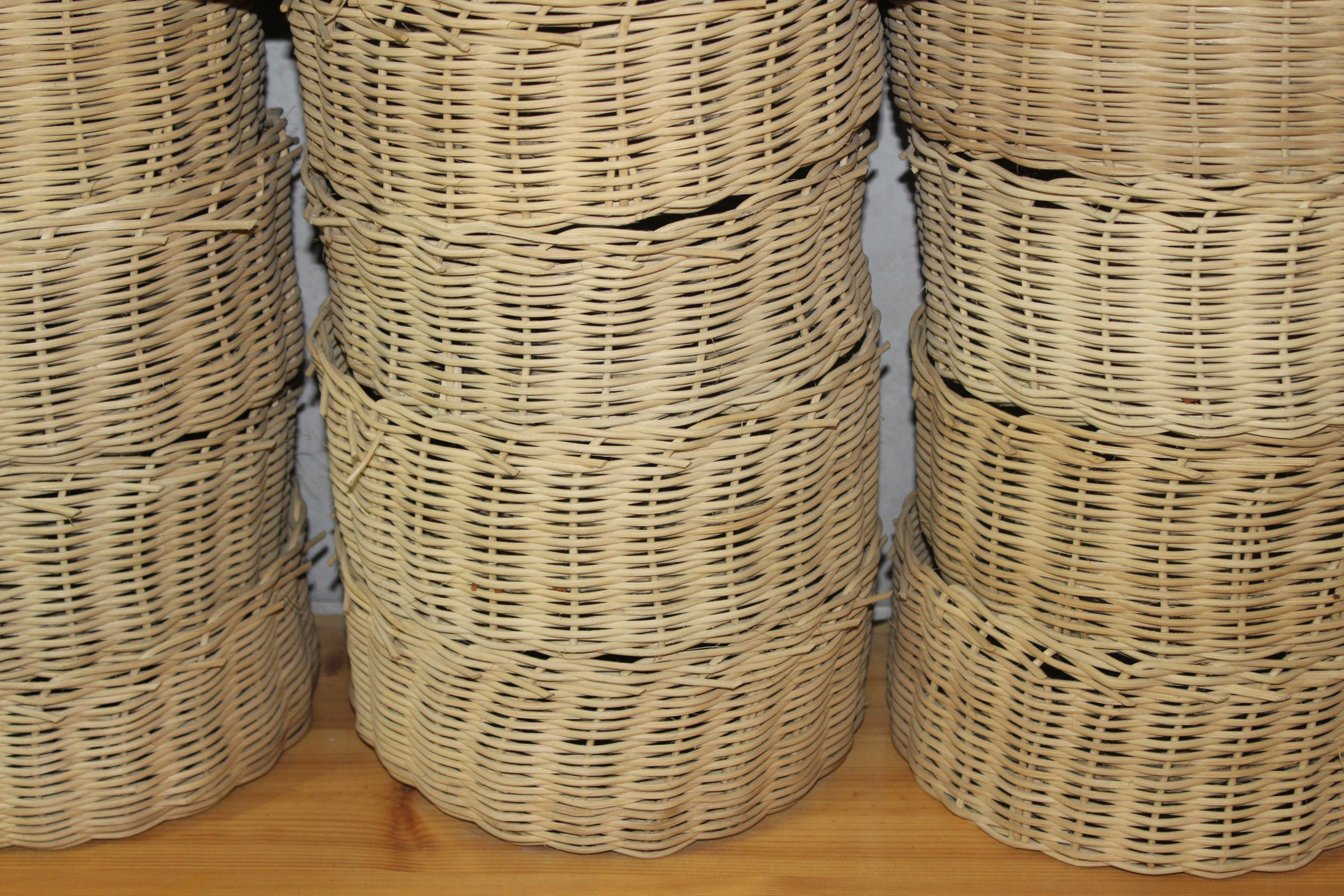
Straw baskets used for making Tzfat cheese

Fresh Tzfatit is used in salads and sandwiches. The salted and aged variety can be grated for baking or cooking.

Water buffalo Tzfatit is usually flavored with Nigella sativa seeds.

== See also ==
- List of sheep milk cheeses
- Israeli cuisine
- List of Israeli cheeses
