= Kedmi Committee =

Israeli governmental committee

The Kedmi Committee (Hebrew: ועדת קדמי לבחינת התחרותיות בענף המזון, lit. 'Kedmi Committee to Examine Competitiveness in the Food Industry') was a governmental committee tasked with the study of the rise of food prices in Israel, which have led to protests, culminated in the cottage cheese boycott. It was named after its head, Sharon Kedmi.

The committee found that the profit margin of retail chains was the main cause for the price rises, followed by the margin of the large dairy manufacturers. Israeli dairy farmers were the least to blame. See "Cottage cheese boycott" for more.
