= Frédéric Jenny =

French economist

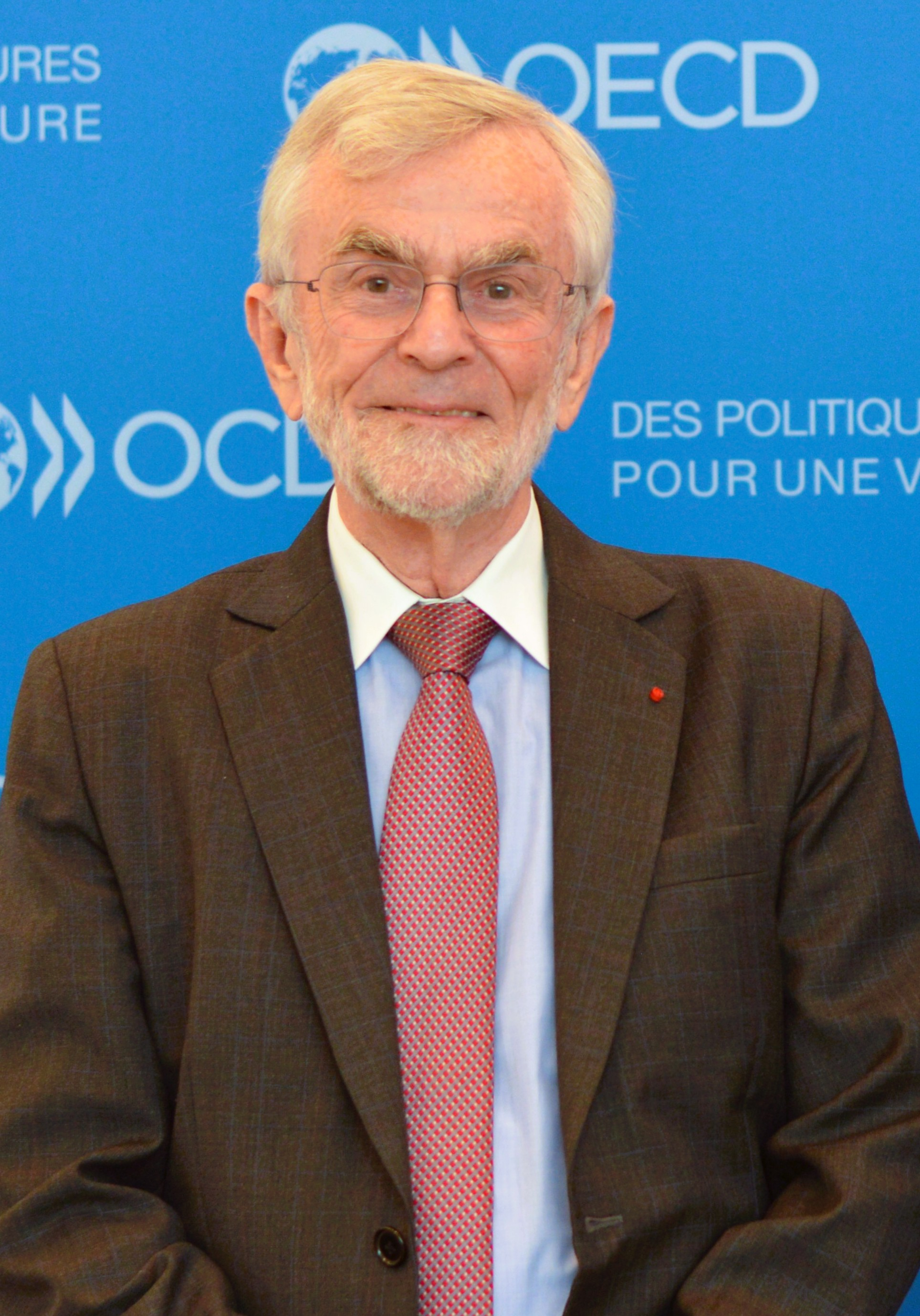
- Born: September 29, 1943 (age 82); Genève, Suisse
- Occupations: Chairman, OECD Competition Committee Professor Emeritus of Economics, ESSEC
- Honours: Officier de l’Ordre de la Légion d’Honneur (2003) Officier de l’Ordre National du Mérite (1999) Chevalier, Ordre de l'Étoile de Roumanie (2017) Ordre du Mérite du Service Diplomatique, Corée (2019)

Frédéric Jenny (born September 29, 1943) is a French economist, Chairman of the OECD Competition Committee from 1994 to 2024 and Emeritus Professor of Economics at ESSEC since 2020.

== Biography ==
He obtained a business degree from ESSEC in 1966, a master's degree and PHD in economics from Harvard University (1971, 1975) as well as a Doctorate in Economics from the University of Paris II in 1977. He has taught at ESSEC as a member of the ESSEC Economics Department since 1972 and became Emeritus Professor of Economics in 2020. In 1976, he co-founded the fortnightly magazine "The Paris Metro" with Thomas Moore (former Life journalist) and became its first editor.

His first advisory position in France was with the French Minister of Consumer Affairs (Christiane Scrivener) in 1977 to introduce merger control regulation and create an antitrust authority (Commission de la concurrence) (via the passing of Law n° 77-806 July 19, 1977), today the Autorité de la Concurrence.

In 1978 he was appointed to the Commission de la Concurrence (the Competition Commission) as Rapporteur. In 1984 he became Rapporteur General and, in 1986, Rapporteur General of the newly created Conseil de la concurrence (Competition Council created by ordonnance n°86-1243 on 1 December 1986 to replace the Competition Commission), a position which he held until 1993. From 1993 to 2004 he acted as vice-chair of the Conseil de la Concurrence(Competition council, French Competition Authority). In September 2004 he was appointed as a judge on special assignment (Conseiller en Service Extraordinaire) to the French Supreme Court (Court of Cassation), where he served in the Commercial, Financial and Economic Chamber until August 2012.

While continuing his teaching and official regulatory activities, he was a member of various governmental committees and commissions. From 1974 to 1979 he was Rapporteur for the Comité d’organisation des recherches appliquées sur le développement économique et social (CORDES) which was part of the French General Planning Commission (Commissariat général du Plan). The CORDES committee coordinated applied research in the fields of economic and social development. From 1982 to 1986 he was a member of the Scientific Committee of the French National Institute of Statistics and Economic Studies (INSEE). From 1988 to 1990 he was chair of a working party devoted to price formation and functioning of markets in developing countries for the Stoleru Mission, of the French Planning Ministry. From June 1990 until June 1996 he was a member of the Scientific Council for Evaluating Public Policies (Conseil scientifique de l’évaluation des politiques publiques). From 2003 until 2007 he was a member of the Scientific Council of the French Ministry of Justice’s Law and Justice research body (Mission Recherche Droit et Justice). From 2016 to 2022, he was Chair of the Professional Ethics Commission of the French Insurance Federation (Fédération Française de l’Assurance).

In parallel with his activities in France, Frederic Jenny was elected Chair of the Competition Committee of the OECD (Organisation for Economic Co-operation and Development) from 1994 to 2024. In 1997 he was elected Chair of the WTO (World Trade Organization) Working Group on the interaction between competition and international commerce and held that position until 2003. From 2007 until 2015 he was a non-Executive Director of the Office of Fair Trading (OFT), United Kingdom.

Additionally, Frederic Jenny has taught at various universities around the world. He was a visiting professor in the Economics department of Northwestern University (U.S.) in 1978; visiting professor at Wuhan University (People's Republic of China) in 1983; Visiting professor in the Economics department of Keio University (Japan) in 1984; Visiting professor at the University of Cape Town Business School (South Africa) in 1991; Visiting professor at University College London (UCL) Law School (United Kingdom) 2005–2008; visiting professor of European law at the University of Haifa Law School (Israel) in 2012; Senior Fellow in the Online Global Competition and Consumer Law Masters Program of the University of Melbourne (Australia) 2016–2018; Global Professor of Law, Hauser Global Law School Program, New York University, (U.S.) in 2014, 2017 and 2022.

He has published several books and numerous articles on microeconomics, industrial organization, development economics, competition law, international commerce law.

Frederic Jenny is an Officer of the French Legion of Honor (2003), Officer of the French National Order of Merit (1999), Knight of the Order of the Star of Romania (2017) and recipient of the Heungin Medal, Order of Diplomatic Service Merit, Republic of Korea (2019).
