= Chongos zamoranos =

Dessert of Mexican cuisine made of curdled milk

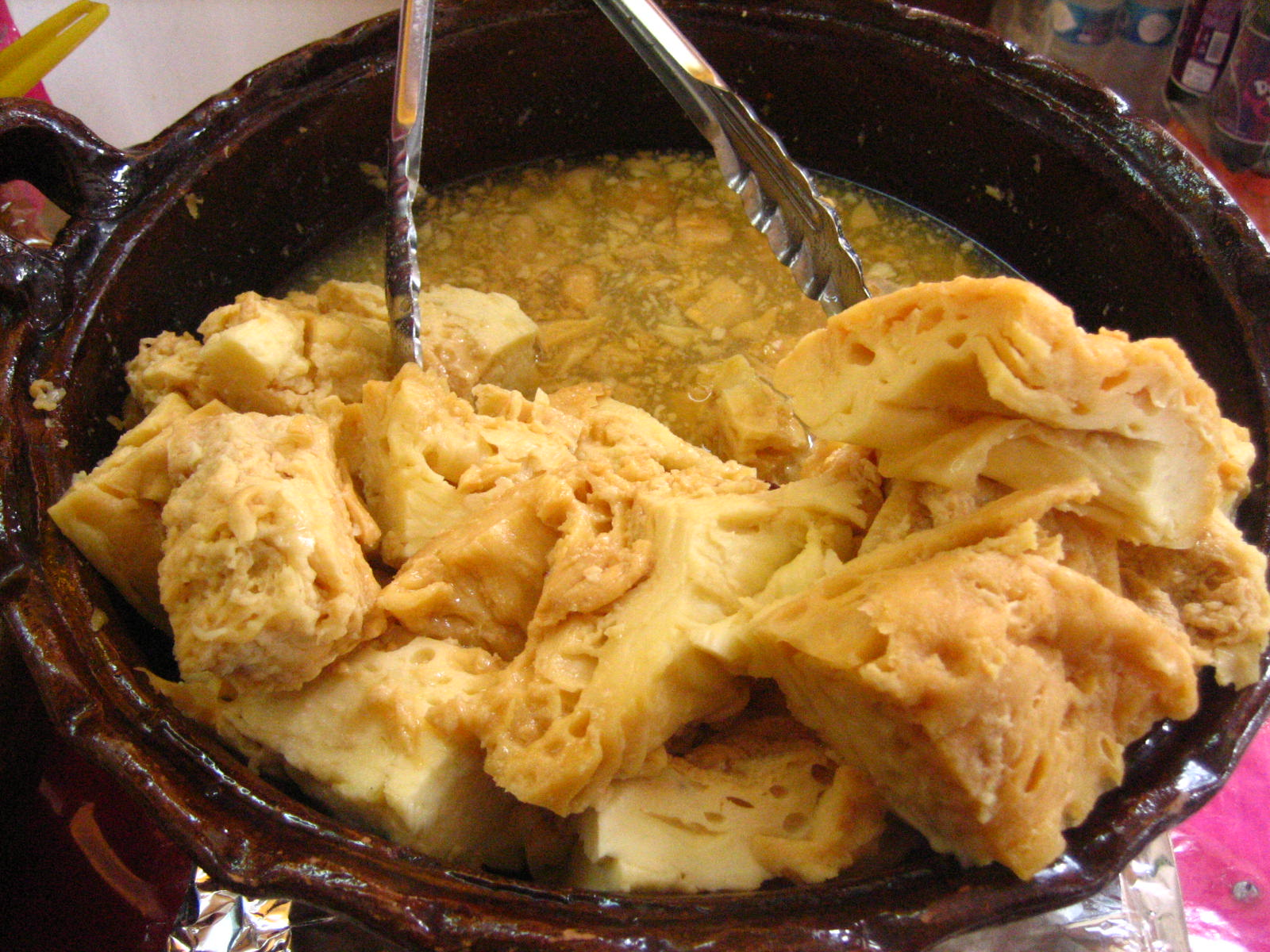
Traditional earthenware pot with prepared chongos

Chongos zamoranos is a Mexican dessert made of curdled milk. It is typically prepared with rennet tablets, milk, sugar and cinnamon. The result is a dish of soft cheese-like consistency on a sweet brown milky syrup. Its origin is attributed to colonial-era convents in the city of Zamora, Michoacán.

== See also ==
- List of Mexican dishes
