= Kefir cheese =

Type of cheese

Kefir cheese is made using a yeast and bacterial culture called kefir, rather than an additional acid or rennet, to separate milk into curd and whey. The curd is separated by cold straining or by heating using the acidic by-products of the kefir culture to set the curd, followed by straining. The resulting cheese has a very tangy, rich flavor and a creamy, dense texture, similar to brie. It may or may not have live culture remaining in the cheese after manufacture depending on the specific process.

In 2024 scientists sequenced the DNA of 3,600 year-old pieces of kefir cheese found with a mummy in northwest China. It's the oldest intact archeological record of cheese.
