= Cottage cheese =

Type of cheese

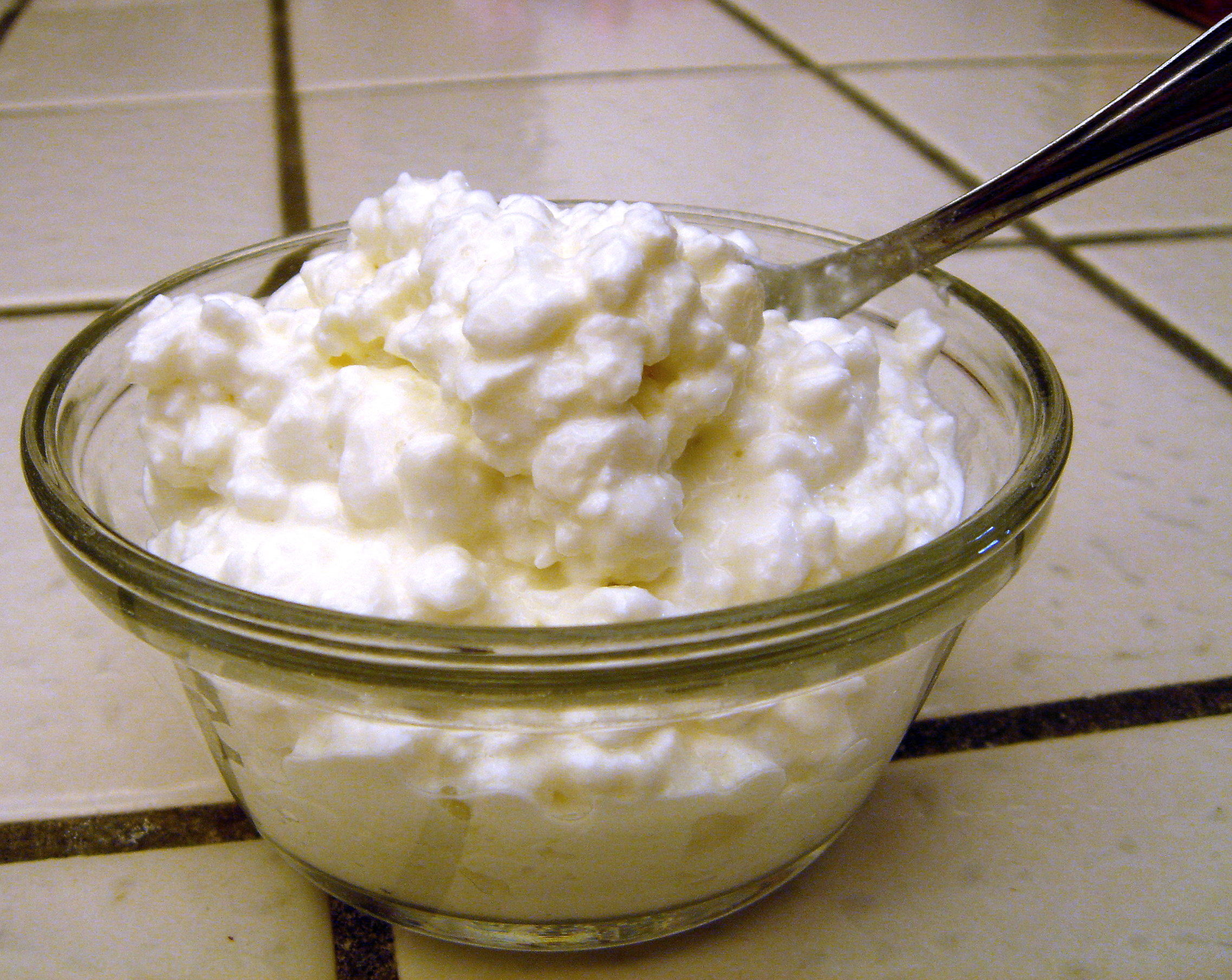
- Cottage cheese
- Source of milk: Skimmed milk
- Texture: Soft, creamy, and soupy
- Fat content: 0~5%

Cottage cheese is a type of fresh cheese with a mild flavor and a creamy, heterogeneous texture made from skimmed milk – hence the low milkfat content. It is made by adding an acid – like vinegar or lemon juice – to the milk which causes the milk proteins (curds) to separate from the liquid (whey). The curds are then drained and mixed with cream and salt, giving cottage cheese its slightly tangy taste and creamy texture. Cottage cheese is not aged.

It was first called 'cottage cheese' in 1831, likely originating from Pennsylvania Dutch immigrants making this cheese in their homesteads (cottages).

Cottage cheese can be relatively low in milkfat and calories for the high amount of protein it provides, and is a rich source of vitamin B_{12}. Cottage cheese comes in different fat levels, including low–fat and fat–free – but even an original 'full fat' version has fewer calories than a chunk of hard cheese or wedge of soft cheese. Cottage cheese is a versatile nutritious food readily added to fruit, vegetables, bread and breakfast items, pastas, sauces, and desserts.

== History ==
=== Origin ===
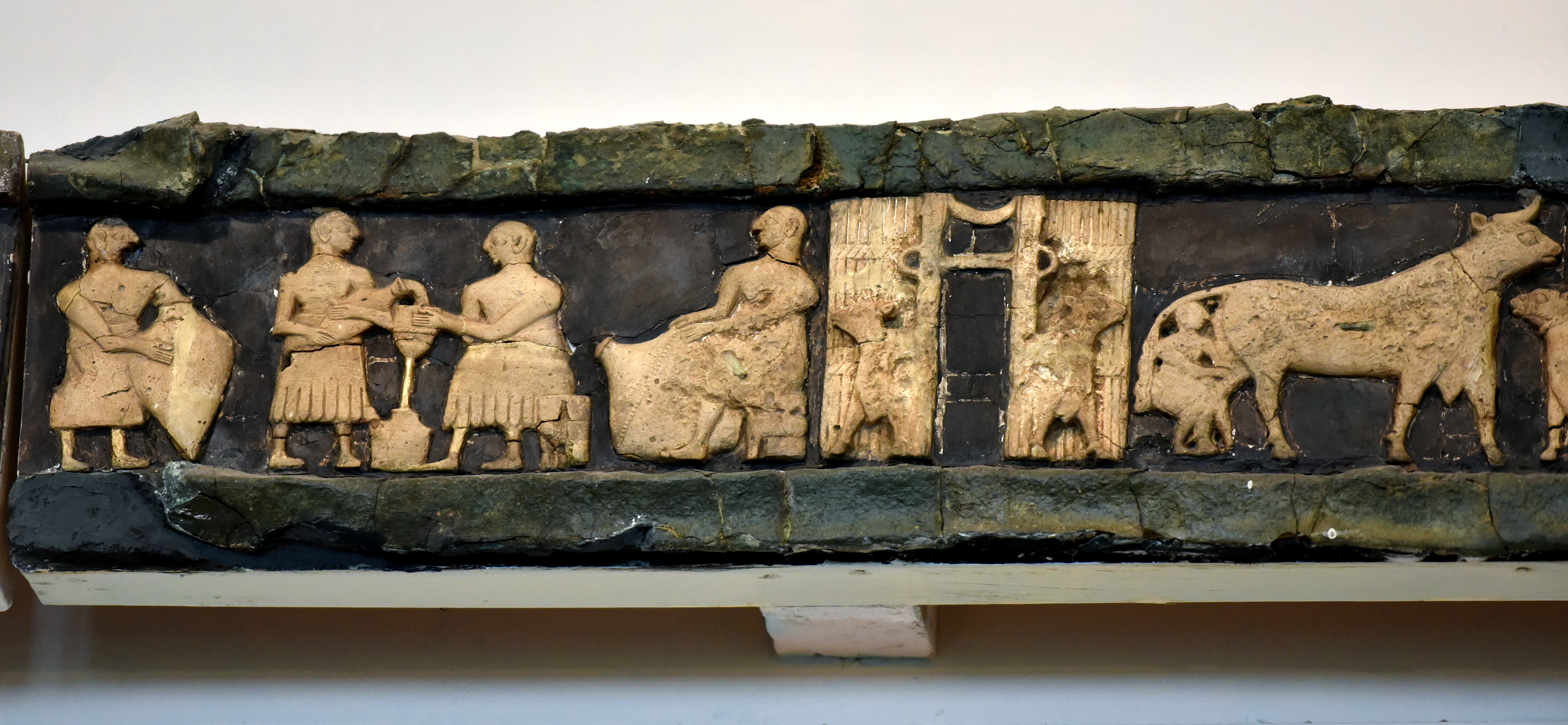
"Frieze of the Dairy", showing the façade of the Temple of the Great Goddess of Life, Ninhursag, at Tell al-'Ubaid, depicts priests engaged in the production of cow dairy in the stables of the complex, Sumerian Gallery of the Iraq Museum in Baghdad.

The first pictorial evidence for cheesemaking was found on a frieze at the Temple of the Great Goddess of Life, Ninhursag, in Mesopotamia in the Fertile Crescent – a region which covers modern day Iraq – and is 5,000 years old. The frieze depicts priests engaged in the production of cow dairy and perhaps creating curd mixture somewhat similar to cottage cheese.

A fictional story on the origin of cheese was taken from Homer's Odyssey, in which the poet describes how the Cyclops, Polyphemus, made cheese by storing milk in animal stomachs. The enzyme rennin from animals stomachs induces a coagulation process separating the curds from the whey.

As Rome expanded its empire, it spread the knowledge of cheese, discovering many new forms. The Romans introduced cheesemaking to England.

Over centuries, European farmers made farmhouse cheeses using fermented-soured milk, then separated the whey from curds as an early form of cottage cheese.

=== Etymology ===
Pennsylvania Dutch immigrants to the United States brought the tradition of fresh cheesemaking with them and, by 1831 in Philadelphia, the term cottage cheese was used in the American vocabulary by reference to making cheese in a homestead or "cottage". In 1841, a “cottage industry cheese factory” using milk from homestead cows was established in Wisconsin by Anne Pickett. Cottage cheese referred to homemade soft, white curds served with bread and crackers as Schmierkäse (German term for "smear-cheese" or spreading cheese),

=== United States ===
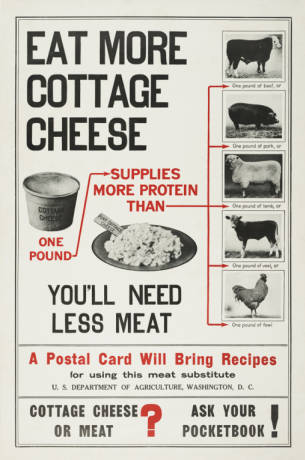
World War I poster encouraging U.S. citizens to consume cottage cheese as an alternative to meat products

Cottage cheese was widely promoted in America during the First World War, along with other dairy products, to save meat for infantry rations. This promotion was shown in many war posters, including one which claimed that one pound of cottage cheese contains more protein than a pound of lamb, pork, beef, or chicken.

After the war, cottage cheese quickly became more commonly consumed. Thirty million pounds (14,000 t) of cottage cheese were produced in 1919 (out of 418,000,000 pounds (190,000 t) of cheese in general in 1920), and by 1928, 87,000,000 pounds (39,000 t) were manufactured. Consumption peaked in the United States in the 1970s when dieting became common, and some $1.3 billion of cottage cheese was sold per year.

Market reviews for the cottage cheese indicate it may have a resurgence in consumer interest during the 21st century along with Greek yogurt, as both foods provide a high protein and low-sugar dietary choice. In 2026, increased consumption of cottage cheese in the United States as a high-protein food source induced cheese factories in Wisconsin and other states to modify equipment to meet the elevated demand.

=== Canada ===
In 2026, cottage cheese consumption increased by 15-20% over market levels in recent years, causing a supply shortage in some regions. In 2025, 35,459 tonnes (78,174,000 lb) of cottage cheese were produced in Canada. The Canadian Dairy Commission maintains consumer guidelines and standards for quality manufacturing of cottage cheese.

== Manufacturing ==
Industrial production of cottage cheese relies on two primary methodologies: the traditional cultured method and the direct acid-set method. The global adoption of these processes varies by region due to local clean-label food regulations, factory scales, and consumer flavour preferences. Both processes begin with pasteurised skimmed milk, concentrated non-fat milk, or reconstituted non-fat dry milk to control baseline protein ratios.

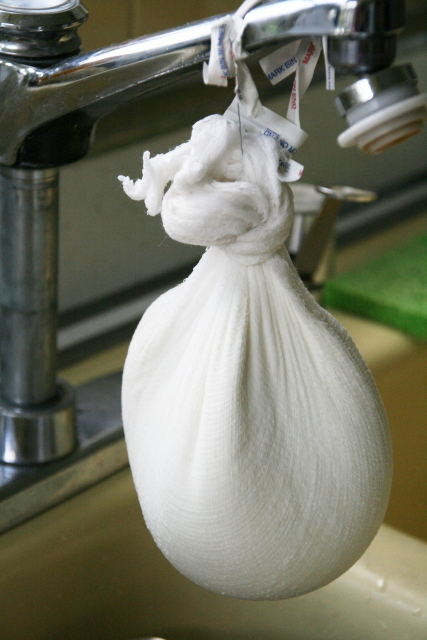
Homemade cheese in cheesecloth is a traditional method

=== Cultured method ===
The cultured method relies on natural bacterial fermentation to coagulate milk proteins and develop flavour. It is the dominant methodology used across the United Kingdom and continental Europe, where commercial dairy producers (such as Arla Foods) align with consumer preferences for clean-label, minimally processed foods that avoid direct chemical additives.

- Inoculation and fermentation: Skimmed milk is pumped into enclosed vats and heated to approximately 30–32 °C (86–90 °F). A mesophilic starter culture of lactic acid-producing strains (such as Lactococcus lactis ssp. lactis or L. lactis ssp. cremoris) is introduced. These bacteria ferment the milk's lactose into lactic acid, dropping the pH over 4 to 8 hours.
- Coagulation: A precise dose of microbial or animal rennet is added to facilitate protein cross-linking. The rising acidity and the rennet cause the milk to curdle into a uniform, gelatinous mass.
- Cutting and cooking: Internal wire grids slice the gel into uniform cubes, determining whether the batch is classified as "small-curd" (<4 mm) or "large-curd" (>8 mm). The vats are heated to 49–54 °C (120–130 °F) under gentle agitation, causing the curd to contract and expel liquid whey.
- Washing and dressing: The whey is drained, and the curd mass is flooded with chilled, purified water. This stops further bacterial acidification and rinses away excess lactic acid, resulting in a mild flavour profile. The dry curds are then mechanically blended with a pasteurised cream dressing and salt.

=== Direct acid-set method ===
The direct acid-set method bypasses bacterial fermentation. Instead, food-grade acids (such as vinegar, citric acid, or lactic acid) are added directly to cold skimmed milk to induce instant coagulation.

This method is common in high-volume manufacturing in Canada and the United States. Eliminating the fermentation window reduces overall production timelines by approximately half and prevents "vat failures" caused by bacteriophages (viruses that disrupt starter cultures). Because the process does not produce natural fermentation aromatics, a starter distillate (diacetyl) is often added to impart a buttery flavour profile similar to cultured varieties. Under US regulations, cottage cheese manufactured via this process must be labelled as "direct acid set".

=== Additives and flavoring ===
To achieve a buttery profile in cultured lines, manufacturers can add small amounts of citrate-fermenting lactococci or Leuconostoc bacterial strains to the starter mix to produce diacetyl. Producers typically maintain a diacetyl-to-acetaldehyde ratio of 3–5 to 1; deviations from this ratio alter the sensory profile, with lower ratios yielding notes described as grassy and higher ratios yielding a sharper taste.

Titanium dioxide (E171) is added to some commercial brands to act as an opaque whitening agent. While permitted up to 1% of total volume by weight in the United States by the Food and Drug Administration (FDA), its global usage has declined due to shifting regional regulations on nanoparticle technology in food ingredients. Following a 2021 assessment by the European Food Safety Authority (EFSA) highlighting unresolved genotoxicity and nanoparticle accumulation concerns, the European Union implemented a full ban on E171 in food products starting in August 2022.

In contrast, the United Kingdom represents a distinct post-Brexit regulatory divergence. The UK Food Standards Agency (FSA), alongside the Committee on Toxicity (COT) and the Committee on Mutagenicity (COM), reviewed the EFSA evidence and concluded that the dietary risk of genotoxicity from food-grade E171 was low. Consequently, titanium dioxide remains a permitted food additive in Great Britain under retained domestic food law.

Despite this legal authorization, many cross-border dairy processors supplying both the UK and EU markets have phased out the additive to maintain single, unified manufacturing lines. To maintain the bright profile desired by consumers without using E171, European manufacturers increasingly utilize alternative whitening agents. The most common substitute is calcium carbonate (E170), which is added to food dressings to achieve opacity without the use of unregulated nanoparticles.

== Nutrition ==
Cottage cheese, full fat
Nutritional value per 100 g (3.5 oz)
- Energy: 103 kcal (430 kJ)
- Carbohydrates: 4.6 g
- Fat: 4.2 g
- Protein: 11.6 g
Vitamins and minerals
Vitamins	Quantity %DV^{†}
Vitamin A equiv.	4% 36 μg
Thiamine (B1)	4% 0.052 mg
Niacin (B3)	1% 0.138 mg
Vitamin B6	3% 0.047 mg
Vitamin B12	28% 0.66 μg
Minerals	Quantity %DV^{†}
Calcium	7% 88 mg
Iron	2% 0.4 mg
Magnesium	2% 9.2 mg
Manganese	3% 0.08 mg
Phosphorus	12% 154 mg
Potassium	4% 124 mg
Sodium	15% 350 mg
Zinc	4% 0.45 mg
- Other constituents: Quantity
- Water: 78 g
- Link to Full Report from USDA Database
- ^{†}Percentages estimated using US recommendations for adults, except for potassium, which is estimated based on expert recommendation from the National Academies.

Full fat cottage cheese is 78% water, 12% protein, 5% carbohydrates, and 4% fat (table). In a reference amount of 100 g (3.5 oz), full fat cottage cheese supplies 103 calories of food energy, and is a rich source (20% or more of the Daily Value, DV) of vitamin B_{12} (28% DV) and a moderate source of phosphorus and sodium (12-15% DV, table).

Cottage cheese is safe to eat during pregnancy, unlike some cheese products that are not recommended. Other than supplying nutrients, there is little evidence that consuming cottage cheese provides any direct health effects.

== Consumption ==
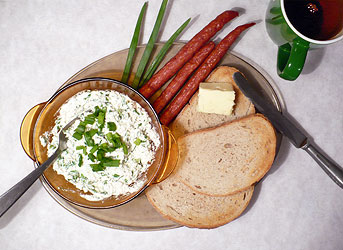
Cottage cheese and kabanos breakfast

In the United States and Canada, cottage cheese is used in many culinary dishes. It can be combined with fruit and sugar, salt and pepper, fruit purée, tomatoes, or granola and cinnamon. It can be eaten on toast, in salads, as a chip dip, as a replacement for mayonnaise in tuna salad, and as an ingredient in recipes such as jello salad and various desserts. Cottage cheese is also consumed with fruit, such as pineapple, pears, peaches, or mandarin oranges.

The sour taste of the product is due to lactic acid, which is present at 124–452 mg/kg. Formic, acetic, propionic and butyric acids contribute to the flavor and aroma.

Due to its incorporation of whey, cottage cheese is high in lactose relative to most other cheeses. However, lactose is partially decomposed by lactic acid fermentation, and is mostly removed after washing the curds.

== See also ==
- Cottage cheese boycott, a consumer boycott in 2011 in Israel against the rise of food prices
- List of cheeses
- Ricotta, an Italian whey cheese
- Paneer, Indian cottage cheese
